= Dromedary (disambiguation) =

Dromedary is a species of camel.

Dromedary may also refer to:

== Places ==
=== Antarctica ===
- Mount Dromedary (Antarctica), Victoria Land
- Dromedary Glacier, Victoria Land

=== Australia ===
- Dromedary, Queensland, a rural locality
- Dromedary, Tasmania, a rural locality
- Mount Dromedary, a mountain in New South Wales

=== United States ===
- Dromedary Hills, an area of hills in Minnesota
- Dromedary Peak, a mountain in Utah

== Other uses ==
- HMS Dromedary, various Royal Navy ships
- Dromedary (band), an American band
- Dromedary naiad, a species of freshwater mussel
- Dromedary Jumping-slug, a species of land slug
- Dromedary bag, a hydration pack
- Dromedary, a GWR Leo Class locomotive

== See also ==
- PZL-Mielec M-18 Dromader (Dromader being Polish for dromedary), a Polish agricultural aircraft
- PZL M-24 Dromader Super, developed from the M-18
- PZL M-25 Dromader Mikro, an unbuilt aircraft developed from the M-18
