= PZL M-25 Dromader Mikro =

Polish agricultural aircraft design

M-25 Dromader Mikro

General information
- Type: Agricultural aircraft
- National origin: Poland
- Manufacturer: WSK-Mielec
- Status: unbuilt project

History
- Developed from: PZL-Mielec M-18 Dromader

The PZL M-25 Dromader Mikro (Dromader is Polish for "Dromedary") is an unbuilt project for a single engine agricultural aircraft, developed in the 1980s by the WSK-Mielec (later PZL-Mielec) from the PZL-Mielec M-18 Dromader. It did not progress beyond the design stage.

== Development ==
During the 1980s, PZL developed a range of agricultural aircraft optimised for larger and smaller areas of land than their successful M-18 Dromader. These included the downsized M-21 Dromader Mini and the enlarged M-24 Dromader Super, both of which flew in prototype form. The M-25 Dromader Mikro would have been the smallest of the family.

It was intended not only for aerial spraying, but to direct aerial spraying operations. PZL hoped it might replace other small agricultural aircraft in widespread use in Comecon countries, such as the PZL-101 Gawron and Zlin Z 37. However, by 1988, the project was abandoned along with the M-21 and M-24 as the company did not have sufficient capacity to manufacture additional designs.

== Design ==
The M-25 was designed as a conventional, low-wing cantilever monoplane with fixed, tailwheel undercarriage. Construction was to be metal throughout. It would have been equipped with a single seat in an enclosed cabin. Power would be supplied by a single PZL AI-14 radial engine mounted tractor-fashion in the nose.

== Specifications (as designed) ==
Data from Glass 1983, p.6; performance calculations from PZL M25 Dromader Mikro, p.34

General characteristics

- Crew: 1 pilot
- Capacity: 500 kg (1,100 lb) of chemicals
- Length: 7.6 m (24 ft 11 in)
- Wingspan: 11.6 m (38 ft 1 in)
- Height: 3.2 m (10 ft 6 in)
- Wing area: 17 m^{2} (180 sq ft)
- Empty weight: 1,000 kg (2,205 lb)
- Max takeoff weight: 1,650 kg (3,638 lb)
- Powerplant: 1 × PZL AI-14 9-cylinder air-cooled radial piston engine, 206 kW (276 hp)

Performance

- Maximum speed: 214 km/h (133 mph, 116 kn)
- Cruise speed: 204 km/h (127 mph, 110 kn)
- Range: 1,200 km (750 mi, 650 nmi)
- Service ceiling: 3,750 m (12,300 ft)
- Rate of climb: 4 m/s (790 ft/min)

== See also ==
Related development

- PZL-Mielec M-18 Dromader
- PZL-Mielec M-21 Dromader Mini
- PZL-Mielec M-24 Dromader Super
- Ayres Thrush

== Notes ==
=== Bibliography ===
- Glass, Andrzej (May 1983). "Airplanes manufactured at PZL-Mielec". Technika lotnicze i astronautyczna. Vol. 38, no. 5. Warsaw: Stowarzyszenie Inżynierów i Techników Mechaników Polskich. pp. 6–7.
- Glass, Andrzej (2009). "Samoloty rolnicze" [Agricultural aircraft]. Polska Technika Lotnicza: Materiały historyczne. No. 1. Warsaw: Klub Miłośników Historii Polskiej Techniki Lotniczej.
- Luto, Krzysztof. "PZL M25 "Dromader Mikro", 1986". Samoloty w Lotnictwie Polskim.
- PZL M21 Lama (Report). PZL Mielec. 1983.
- Simpson, R. W. (1995). Airlife's General Aviation. Shrewsbury: Airlife Publishing.
