= Bratukhin Omega =

Omega
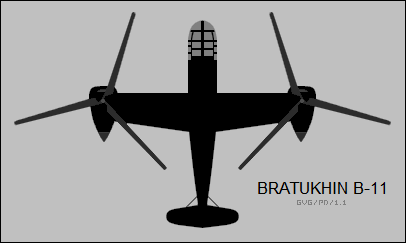
- Bratukhin B-11 top-view silhouette

General information
- Type: Experimental helicopter
- Manufacturer: Bratukhin
- Designer: Ivan Pavlovich Bratukhin
- Number built: 1

History
- First flight: August 1941 (tethered)

The Bratukhin Omega (also known as the 2MG) was an early Soviet helicopter, the first product of a new Soviet design bureau, OKB-3 that was created from within TsAGI specifically to develop rotary-wing aircraft. Bratukhin's design was a transverse rotor aircraft, with each rotor carried on a long outrigger truss. The Omega's rotors were each powered by a separate engine carried in a nacelle also at the end of the truss. Captive trials commenced in August 1941 and revealed severe problems with engine vibration and overheating. Before these could be addressed, however, OKB-3 was evacuated ahead of the German advance into the Soviet Union.

== Design and development ==
Flight testing recommenced in mid-1942, with the Omega still flying on a tether until early the next year. Free-flight trials confirmed the design as basically sound, so although the engine difficulties were never fully resolved, Bratukhin was convinced that further development along the same general lines would prove fruitful. Development of the Omega helicopter was incremental with progressively more powerful engines, stronger structure and more reliable dynamic components, such as gearboxes and transmission shafts.

The ultimate iteration of the Omega was the Bratukhin B-11 which was used to compare characteristics of the products of the three competing helicopter designers. Completed in 1948 this was probably the most successful of the breed up to that time but still exhibited some of the short-comings of the configuration; mismatch between fixed wing and rotor and reliability of the complex dynamic components.

The lateral twin-rotor system was not put to rest, however, and was resurrected in the Kamov Ka-22 and the Mil V-12.

== Variants ==
- Bratukhin 2MG (2 Motor Gelikopter – twin engined helicopter) - Alternative designation for the 'Omega'.
- Bratukhin Omega II - The Omega with more powerful engines in streamlined pods, with fan-assisted cooling, and stiffer, more reliable dynamic components.
- Bratukhin G-2 - Alternative designation for "Omega II".
- Bratukhin G-3 - 2 x prototype artillery spotter helicopters, "Omega II" with imported 450 hp Pratt & Whitney Wasp Junior engines. One prototype 'AK' delivered to VVS for pilot training.
- Bratukhin G-4 - The first Soviet helicopter powered by purpose-designed engines with a cooling fan and front mounted gearbox with outputs for rotor drive and inter-connection shaft as well as a centrifugal clutch and improved rotor, two prototypes built.
- Bratukhin B-5 - The first Helicopter named after Bratukhin was a scaled-up "G-4" with more powerful engines and a new airframe of light alloy stressed skin with a lifting aerofoil wing set at zero incidence, completed in 1947 but only limited test flying due to excessive wing flexure.
- Bratukhin B-9 - An ambulance derivative of the 'B-5' with a larger fuselage housing four stretchers in two layers with an attendant. The wing was changed to a symmetrical section set at positive incidence. One example completed in 1947 but never flown due to the wing flexure problems identified by flight testing of the 'B-5'.
- Bratukhin B-10 - With a new fuselage this slightly enlarged version of the "B-9" introduced bracing struts from the fuselage through the wings at the main spar and up to the rotor head. An observation cupola was fitted at the extreme nose, above the pilots cockpit, and a gunners position was provided at the aft end of the fuselage. Power was supplied by fully boosted AI-26GRF engines. A twin-finned variable incidence tail unit was also introduced. The new fuselage allowed the "B-10" to fulfill all the envisaged roles without building separate versions. One example was built in 1947 and underwent successful flight testing. Later the "B-10" was flown with single ShKAS machine guns in the nose and tail positions.
- Bratukhin B-11 - To provide data for comparison with Yakovlev and Mil helicopters two examples of the "B-11" were authorized and underwent flight testing to measure their performance from April 1948. Single-engined flight, auto-rotation and a marked reduction in vibration were all demonstrated. Problems identified included; a persistent hydraulic leak and rotor stalling due to lack of lift from the fixed wing at high speeds. Many modifications were proposed before the first prototype was destroyed, and the pilots killed, after the right hand rotor shed a blade in flight. A general disillusionment with helicopters in general and superior handling and performance from single rotor designs led to termination of the twin lateral rotor Bratukhin helicopters.
- Bratukhin AK - Ten AK (Artilleriskii Korrektirovshchik – artillery correction) production G-3 helicopters ordered but manufacture and/or delivery is uncertain.
- Bratukhin VNP (Vozdushnii Nabludatyelnii Punkt - aerial observation point) - Alternative designation for "B-10".

== Specifications ==
Data from Gunston, Bill. The Osprey Encyclopaedia of Russian Aircraft 1875–1995. London, Osprey. 1995. ISBN 1-85532-405-9.

General characteristics

- Crew: one pilot
- Capacity: 1 observer.
- Length: 8.2 m (26 ft 11 in)
- Height: 3.24 m (10 ft 7 in)
- Empty weight: 1,760 kg (3,880 lb)
- Gross weight: 2,050 kg (4,519 lb)
- Powerplant: 2 × MV-6 , 164 kW (220 hp) each
- Main rotor diameter: 2 × 7.0 m (23 ft 0 in)
- Main rotor area: 77.0 m^{2} (839 sq ft)

Performance

- Maximum speed: 186 km/h (116 mph, 101 kn)
- Range: 250 km (156 mi, 136 nmi)
- Service ceiling: 700 m (2,300 ft)

== See also ==
- Focke Achgelis Fa 223
- McDonnell HJD Whirlaway
- Platt-LePage XR-1
