= PZL-107 =

Unrealised 1980s Polish project for an agricultural aircraft

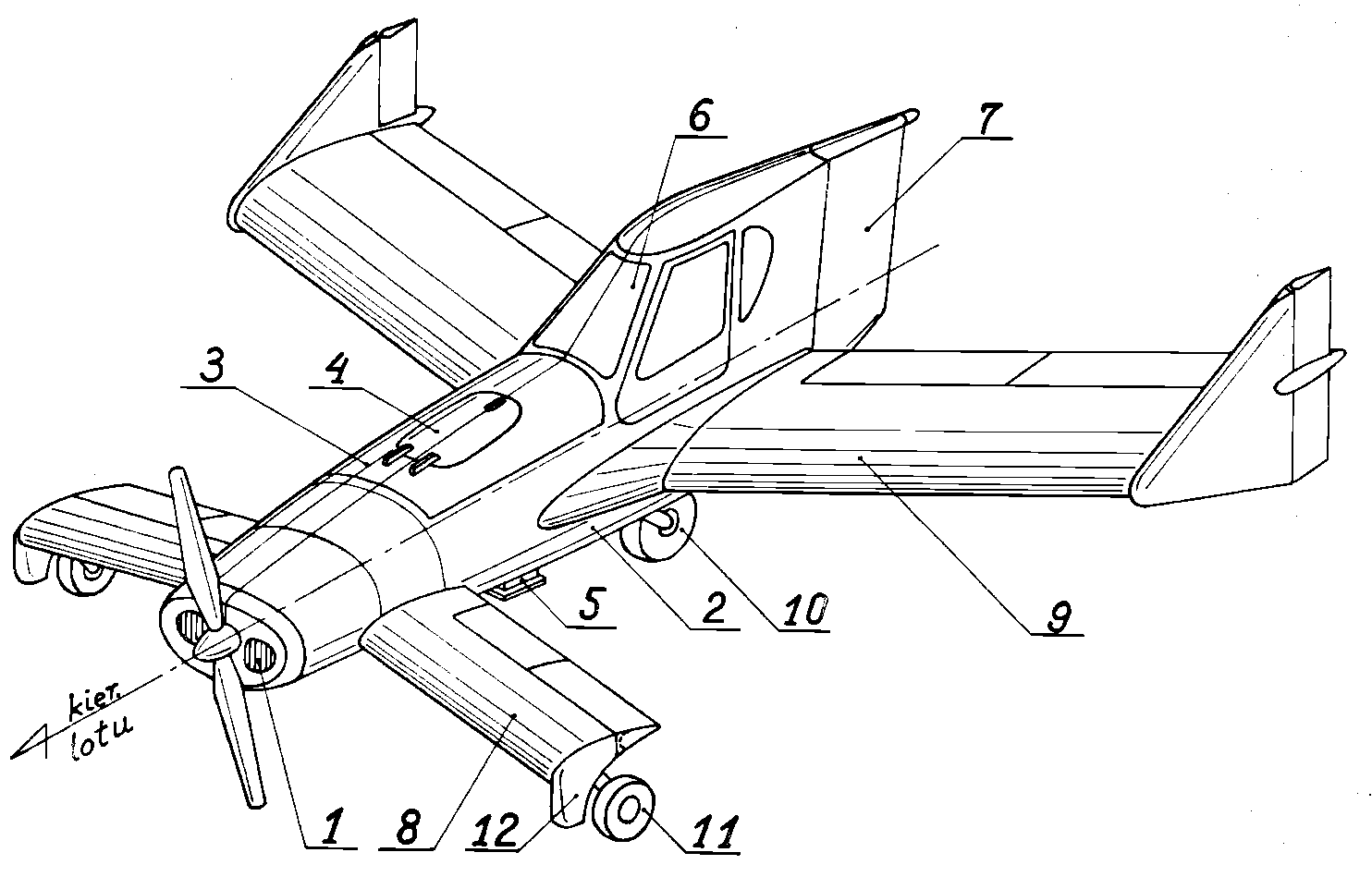
- PZL-107 Kaczor I design, from its patent document

General information
- Type: Agricultural aircraft
- National origin: Poland
- Manufacturer: PZL
- Designer: Andrzej Frydrychewicz and Witold Błażewicz (Kaczor I); Andrzej Frydrychewicz and Stanisław Danilecki (Kaczor II)
- Status: Unrealised project

The PZL-107 was a project undertaken by Polish company PZL during the 1980s to develop an agricultural aircraft to succeed its PZL-106 Kruk in production. The project progressed through three distinct designs but did not reach prototype stage before being cancelled.

== Kawka ==
The first design for the PZL-107, named Kawka (the Polish name for the European jackdaw) was proposed in 1983. Unlike the piston-engined Kruk, the Kawka was to be turboprop-powered. PZL hoped that the lower weight of the turbine engine would allow it to manufacture a smaller aircraft with the same capacity as the Kruk. The company also planned the Kawka to share common assemblies with other aircraft in its range. The first flight of a prototype was expected by 1986.

== Kaczor I ==
By 1986, the PZL-107 designation was applied to a new, unrelated, and radical design, named Kaczor (Polish for "Duck", but also for "canard" in aeronautics, itself French for "duck"), and retrospectively named the Kaczor I when the third PZL-107 design re-used this name.

PZL engineers Andrzej Frydrychewicz and Witold Błażewicz set out to solve a problem with conventionally designed agricultural aircraft. Typically, the spray apparatus of such aircraft is located in the wings, which means that the spray is subject to wastage as it accumulates on the tailplane.

Therefore, Frydrychewicz and Błażewicz gave the aircraft a canard configuration. Because this layout has no tail, and because the piston engine and propeller were mounted at the front of the aircraft, spray could be dispensed from the rear of the aircraft completely unobstructed. Horizontal stability was provided by two long canards near the nose. These were designed with a significant anhedral, which allowed them to also form part of the aircraft's undercarriage. The main undercarriage was a semi-retractable monowheel beneath the fuselage, which was supplemented by two small wheels at the tips of the canards. In their patent, Frydrychewicz and Błażewicz claimed that this undercarriage arrangement provided a significant weight-saving for the design, and that the anhedral on the canards provided both stability in flight, and better visibility for the pilot. The wings featured moderate sweep-back and carried large fins at their tips, which extended both above and below them. The cabin was highly streamlined, and blended into a large rudder.

Work on the design continued at least into 1987. This iteration of the PZL-107 proceeded as far as constructing and fight-testing a scale model. When this crashed, work on the Kaczor I was abandoned. However, the Polish patents office issued a patent for it in 1990.

== Kaczor II ==
Even while the original Kaczor was under development, Frydrychewicz worked with Stanisław Danilecki on another design for the PZL-107, dubbed the Kaczor II. Again, this was a canard design, this time inspired by the work of Burt Rutan. It featured a turboprop engine, tricycle undercarriage, and completely redesigned wings and canards. Vertical surfaces joined the tips of the canards to the wings, creating a closed wing. Two small horizontal stabilisers, again with marked anhedral, were attached to the roof of the cabin, to make this a three-surface design. Work on this iteration was abandoned when money for the project ran out.
