= PZL M-21 Dromader Mini =

Polish agricultural aircraft prototype

M-21 Dromader Mini
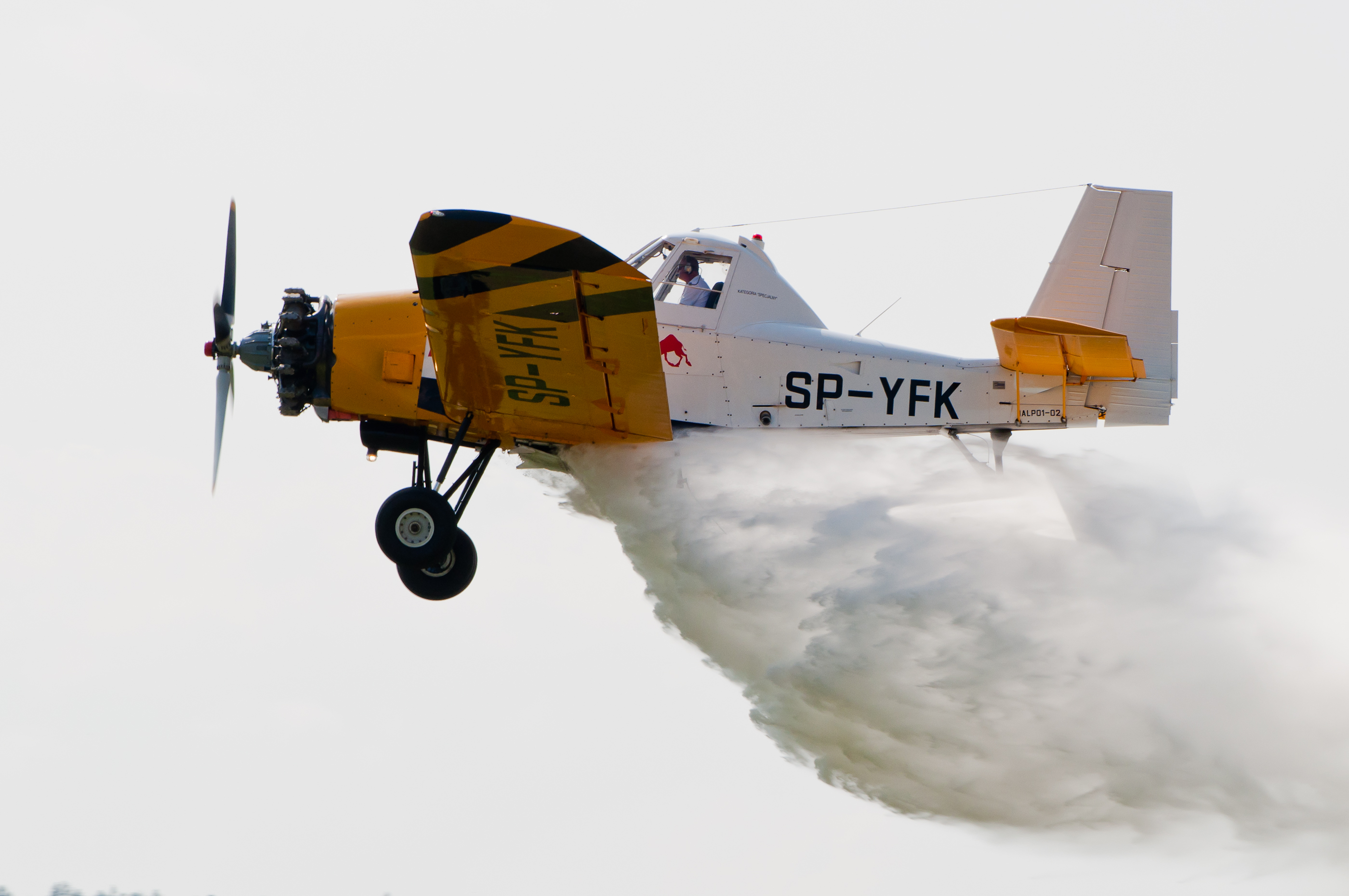

General information
- Type: Agricultural aircraft
- National origin: Poland
- Manufacturer: WSK-Mielec
- Designer: Jarosław Rumszewicz
- Number built: 2

History
- First flight: June 18, 1982
- Developed from: PZL-Mielec M-18 Dromader

The PZL M-24 Dromader Mini (Dromader is Polish for "Dromedary"), originally named the Lama (Polish for "Llama"), is a single engine agricultural aircraft, developed in the 1980s by WSK-Mielec (later PZL-Mielec) from the PZL-Mielec M-18 Dromader. The prototype, registration SP-PDM, first flew on 18 June 1982. It did not progress beyond the prototyping stage.

== Development ==
By the early 1980s, WSK-Mielec was aware that the economics of aerial application in agriculture varied according to the characteristics of the land being treated. One relevant factor was the size of the plot, where a larger aircraft is more cost-effective for treating a larger area of land, and a smaller aircraft more cost-effective for a smaller area. The company therefore decided to manufacture a range of agricultural aircraft of different sizes, based on the already-proven M-18 design. This member of the family was intended for smaller areas of land, up to about 50 hectares (120 acres).

The M-21 was designed to retain as much commonality with the M-18 as possible; ultimately around 70% was achieved. Common areas included the cabin, rear fuselage, empennage, outer wing panels, and mainwheels. The desire to maximise this commonality resulted in an overall weight greater than what would otherwise have been necessary.

Design work commenced in January 1980 and was concluded by June that year. Construction of the first prototype began in August 1981, and it first flew on 18 June 1982. Three prototypes were built: two for flight testing and one for static tests.

The prototypes were tested from 1982 to 1986, when the design was certified. However, PZL did not have capacity to manufacture the design alongside the company's existing programs and no further examples were built.

A turboprop version, the M-21T, powered by a Walter M601A, was designed but never constructed.

== Design ==
The M-21 is a conventional, low-wing cantilever monoplane with fixed, tailwheel undercarriage. Construction is of metal throughout. It is equipped with a single seat in an enclosed cabin. Power is supplied by a single PZL-3SR radial engine mounted tractor-fashion in the nose.

== Specifications ==
Data from PZL M-21 Dromader Mini, p. 17

General characteristics

- Crew: 1 pilot
- Capacity: 1,700 L (450 US gal; 370 imp gal) / 965 kg (2,127 lb) of chemicals
- Length: 9.48 m (31 ft 1 in)
- Wingspan: 14.51 m (47 ft 7 in)
- Height: 3.11 m (10 ft 2 in)
- Wing area: 32.6 m^{2} (351 sq ft)
- Empty weight: 2,060 kg (4,542 lb)
- Max takeoff weight: 3,300 kg (7,275 lb)
- Powerplant: 1 × PZL-3SR 7-cylinder air-cooled radial piston engine, 442 kW (593 hp)

Performance

- Maximum speed: 187 km/h (116 mph, 101 kn)
- Cruise speed: 180 km/h (110 mph, 97 kn)
- Service ceiling: 2,900 m (9,500 ft)
- Rate of climb: 3.8 m/s (750 ft/min)

== See also ==
Related development

- PZL-Mielec M-18 Dromader
- PZL-Mielec M-24 Dromader Super
- Ayres Thrush

== Notes ==
=== Bibliography ===
- Glass, Andrzej (May 1983). "Airplanes manufactured at PZL-Mielec". Technika lotnicze i astronautyczna. Vol. 38, no. 5. Warsaw: Stowarzyszenie Inżynierów i Techników Mechaników Polskich. pp. 6–7.
- Glass, Andrzej (2009). "Samoloty rolnicze" [Agricultural aircraft]. Polska Technika Lotnicza: Materiały historyczne. No. 1. Warsaw: Klub Miłośników Historii Polskiej Techniki Lotniczej.
- Lambert, Mark; Munson, Kenneth; Taylor, Michael J.H., eds. (1991). Jane's All the World's Aircraft 1991-92 (82nd ed.). Coulson, Surrey, UK: Jane's Information Group.
- Luto, Krzysztof. "PZL M21 "Dromader Mini", 1982 ("Lama")". Samoloty w Lotnictwie Polskim.
- "PZL-M21 Dromader Mini". Technika lotnicze i astronautyczna. Vol. 38, no. 5. Warsaw: Stowarzyszenie Inżynierów i Techników Mechaników Polskich. May 1983. pp. 17–18.
- PZL M21 Lama (Report). PZL Mielec. 1980.
- Simpson, R. W. (1995). Airlife's General Aviation. Shrewsbury: Airlife Publishing.
- Taylor, John W.R., ed. (1984). Jane's All the World's Aircraft 1984-85 (75th ed.). London: Jane's Publishing Co.
- Taylor, Michael J. H. (1993). Jane's Encyclopedia of Aviation. London: Studio Editions.
- Witkowski, Bogusław (16 January 1983). "Rodzina Dromaderow" ["Dromader family"]. Skrzydlata Polska. No. 3 (1625). Warsaw: Wydawnictwa Komunikacji i Łączności. pp. 4–5.
