= Bratukhin B-5 =

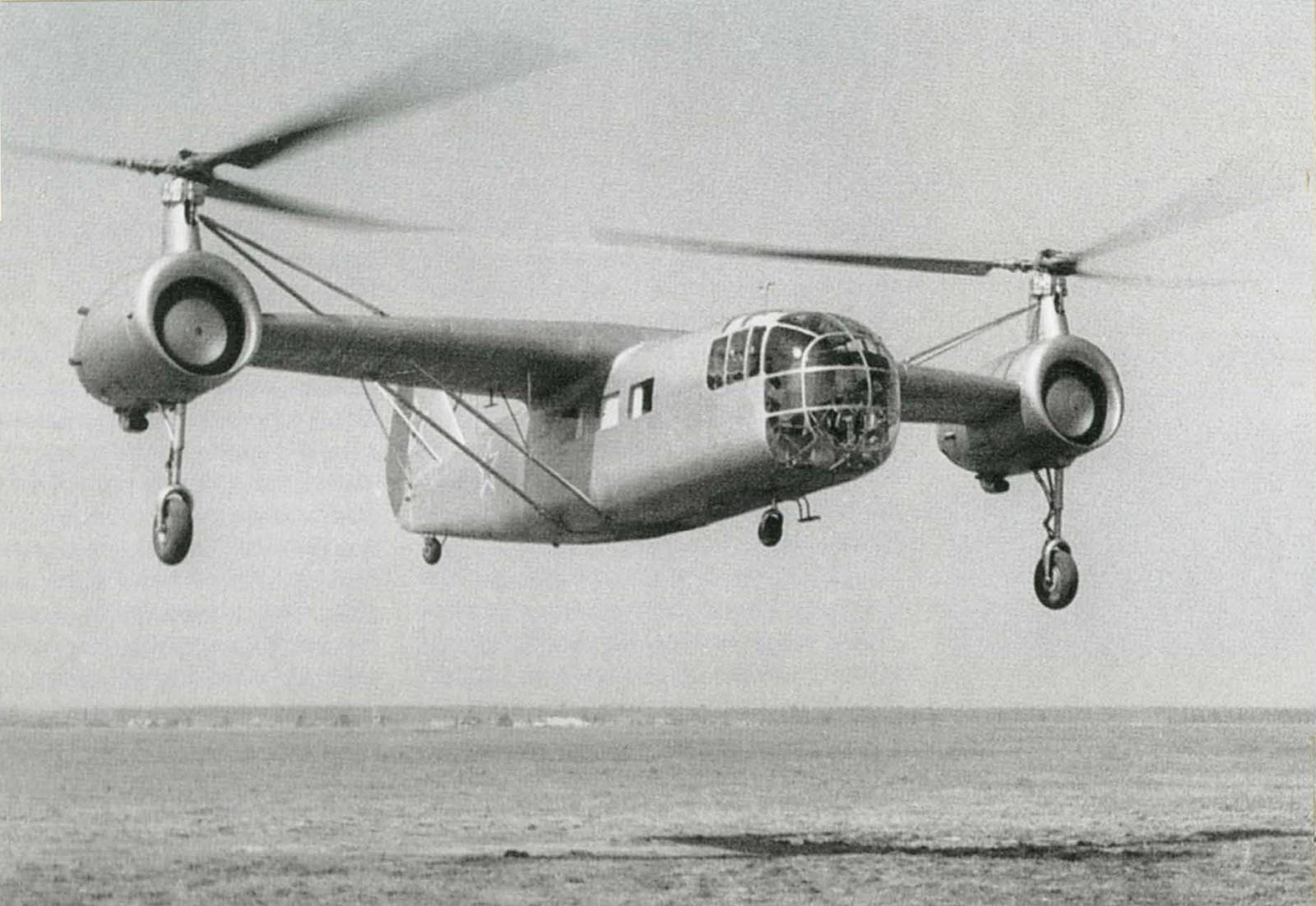
- Bratukhin B-5 conducting a test flight

General information
- Type: Transport helicopter
- National origin: Soviet Union
- Manufacturer: Bratukhin
- Number built: 1 (B-5); 1 (B-9); 1 (B-10)

History
- First flight: 1947
- Variant: Bratukhin B-11

The Bratukhin B-5 was a prototype Soviet transverse rotor helicopter designed by the Bratukhin aircraft design bureau.

== Development ==
The B-5 was an improved and larger design based on the bureau's earlier G-4, a twin-rotor helicopter, with each rotor driven by an Ivchenko AI-26 radial engine. Each engine was housed in a pod on an outrigger with the related rotor above. The programme was delayed waiting for appropriate engines and the B-5 was not completed until 1947, it only made a few short hops before the programme was abandoned due to vibration and structural flexing.

An air ambulance variant, the Bratukhin B-9 was built but was abandoned without being flown. Another variant was the Bratukhin B-10 which had uprated 575 hp (429 kW) engines and was modified for use in the artillery observation role with the military designation VNP (Vosdushnii Nabludatelnii Punk - Aerial Observation Point). The B-10 had three-seat for the crew, the cabin could hold three passengers or equipment. The B-10 flew in 1947 but although it did not have the wing stiffness problems of the B-54, demonstrating adequate handling like the B-5 and B-9 was also abandoned. A variant with an improved performance was built as the Bratukhin B-11.

== Variants ==
B-5
Prototype, one built.
B-9
Prototype air ambulance variant, one built.
B-10
Prototype observation and reconnaissance variant, one built.

== Specifications (B-10) ==
Data from

General characteristics

- Crew: 3
- Capacity: 3 or additional equipment
- Empty weight: 3,019 kg (6,656 lb)
- Max takeoff weight: 3,900 kg (8,598 lb)
- Powerplant: 2 × Ivchenko AI-26GVF) radial piston engine, 429 kW (575 hp) each
- Main rotor diameter: 2 × 10.00 m (32 ft 10 in)

Performance

- Maximum speed: 218 km/h (135 mph, 118 kn)
- Range: 440 km (270 mi, 240 nmi)

== See also ==
Related development

- Bratukhin G-4
- Bratukhin B-11

Related lists

- List of rotorcraft
