= Twin rotor =

Twin rotor can refer to the following kinds of aircraft, all of which have two rotors arranged in various ways:

- Coaxial-rotor aircraft
- Intermeshing-rotor helicopter
- Tandem-rotor aircraft
- Transverse-rotor aircraft
