= Bratukhin =

Bratukhin, or OKB-3, was a Soviet aircraft design bureau created in 1940 from within TsAGI to develop helicopters. Headed by Ivan Pavlovich Bratukhin, the bureau built several experimental helicopters over the next decade. Each model had the same basic design of two rotors with separate engines carried on the ends of outriggers to each side of the fuselage. The bureau was dissolved in 1951.

== Models Produced ==
Bratukhin Omega

Original prototype helicopter with two 164 kW engines mounted at the end of outriggers.

Bratukhin Omega II

Improved version of the Omega, with 261 kW engines and structural strengthening. One example produced, which was flown to an altitude of 3000m in January 1945 and used thereafter for pilot training.

Bratukhin G-3

Similar to the Omega II, but powered by 336 kW Pratt & Whitney R-985 Wasp Juniors. Two prototypes were followed by five production aircraft. Four were used for research and one for pilot training.

Bratukhin G-4

Similar to the original Omega, but powered by 373 kW Ivchenko AI-26GR engines. Two prototypes and four production aircraft built.

Bratukhin B-5

Improved and larger design completed in 1947. Powered by improved AI-26 engines developing 410 kW. Only brief hops were made due to structural problems.

Bratukhin B-9

Similar to B-5 with fuselage designed for air ambulance use. Cancelled after failure of B-5

Bratukhin B-10

Similar in configuration to B-5, with uprated AI-26 engines of 429 kW. Fuselage designed for use in artillery observation role. Flown in 1947 but ultimately abandoned.

Bratukhin B-11

The last of Bratukhin's helicopters. Generally similar to B-5 with an improved rotor system. Two prototypes produced. One lost in fatal accident on 13 December 1948.

=== Unbuilt projects ===
From

Bratukhin B-6
Two-seat helicopter

Bratukhin B-7
heavy-lift assault transport helicopter

Bratukhin B-8
agricultural helicopter

Bratukhin heavy transport helicopter
heavy transport helicopter with tip-jet powered rotors

Bratukhin heavy transport convertiplane
heavy transport convertiplane with burners at blade tips and a compressed-air rotor drive

Bratukhin heavy-lift flying crane helicopter
flying crane helicopter intended to haul huge loads over distances of 63 miles (100 km)
