= R max =

R max, also written as Rmax with other variants possible, can refer to:

- The Yamaha R-MAX unmanned helicopter
- In the high performance LINPACK benchmarks of supercomputers it refers to the performance in GFLOPS for the largest problem run on a machine
- Maximal thermal resistance (R_{max}), see thermal transmittance
