= PZL-Mielec M-18 Dromader =

Agricultural aircraft in Poland

M-18 Dromader
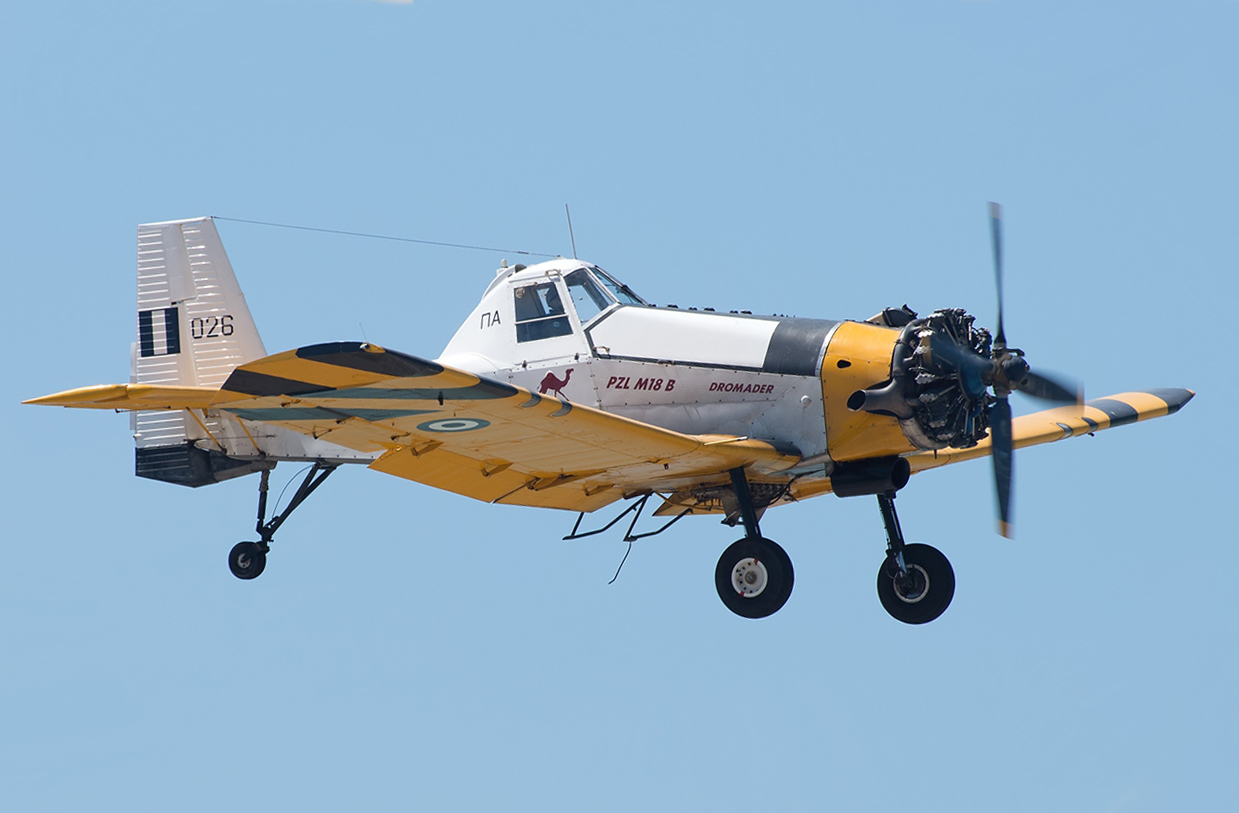
- M-18B Dromader in flight

General information
- Type: Utility aircraft
- National origin: Poland
- Manufacturer: PZL-Mielec
- Status: Active, in production
- Number built: 759+

History
- Manufactured: 1976-present
- First flight: 27 August 1976
- Developed from: Rockwell Thrush Commander
- Developed into: PZL-Mielec M-21 Dromader Mini; PZL-Mielec M-24 Dromader Super; PZL-Mielec M-25 Dromader Mikro

The PZL-Mielec M-18 Dromader (English: "Dromedary") is a single engine agricultural aircraft that is manufactured by PZL-Mielec in Poland. The aircraft is used mainly as a cropduster or firefighting machine.

== Development ==
PZL-Mielec, then known as WSK-Mielec, began to design the Dromader in the mid 1970s, with help of United States aircraft manufacturer Rockwell International. PZL-Mielec asked for Rockwell's help because of the political situation at the time: operating in an Eastern Bloc country, PZL wanted the aircraft to sell well worldwide, and the company realized that certification by the United States Federal Aviation Administration would be important in reaching that goal. Rockwell on the other hand wanted to fit Polish high-power radial engines into its agricultural planes. As a result of this cooperation the Rockwell Thrush Commander aircraft was fitted with the PZL-3 engine, and the Polish designers created the higher payload M-18 Dromader by introducing the more powerful ASz-62 engine, making structural changes to the airframe, and increasing dimensions. The cooperation led to the Dromader sharing outer wing panels and part of the fuselage with the Thrush Commander.

The first prototype of the aircraft flew on August 27, 1976. In September 1978, the aircraft was given certification to fly in Poland. Certifications from many countries around the world followed soon.

During the 1980s, PZL envisaged a family of related designs based on the M-18, optimised for different capacities. The M-21 Dromader Mini and M-24 Dromader Super flew in prototype form, and a M-25 Dromader Mikro was designed. However, none of these saw production.

Many aircraft of the M-18 type and its variations can still be seen around the world. They were sold to 24 countries, over 200 are used in the US. In 2008, fifteen were sold to China. In 2012, PZL-Mielec was still selling models M-18B and M-18BS, with 759 built in total. As of 2017, the Dromader was sold by PZL-Mielec, but the production has been halted. The produced aircraft are still refurbished instead, with new engines (produced by WSK "PZL-Kalisz"). There are plans to acquire rights and renew the production in WZL-2 in Bydgoszcz.

== Variants ==
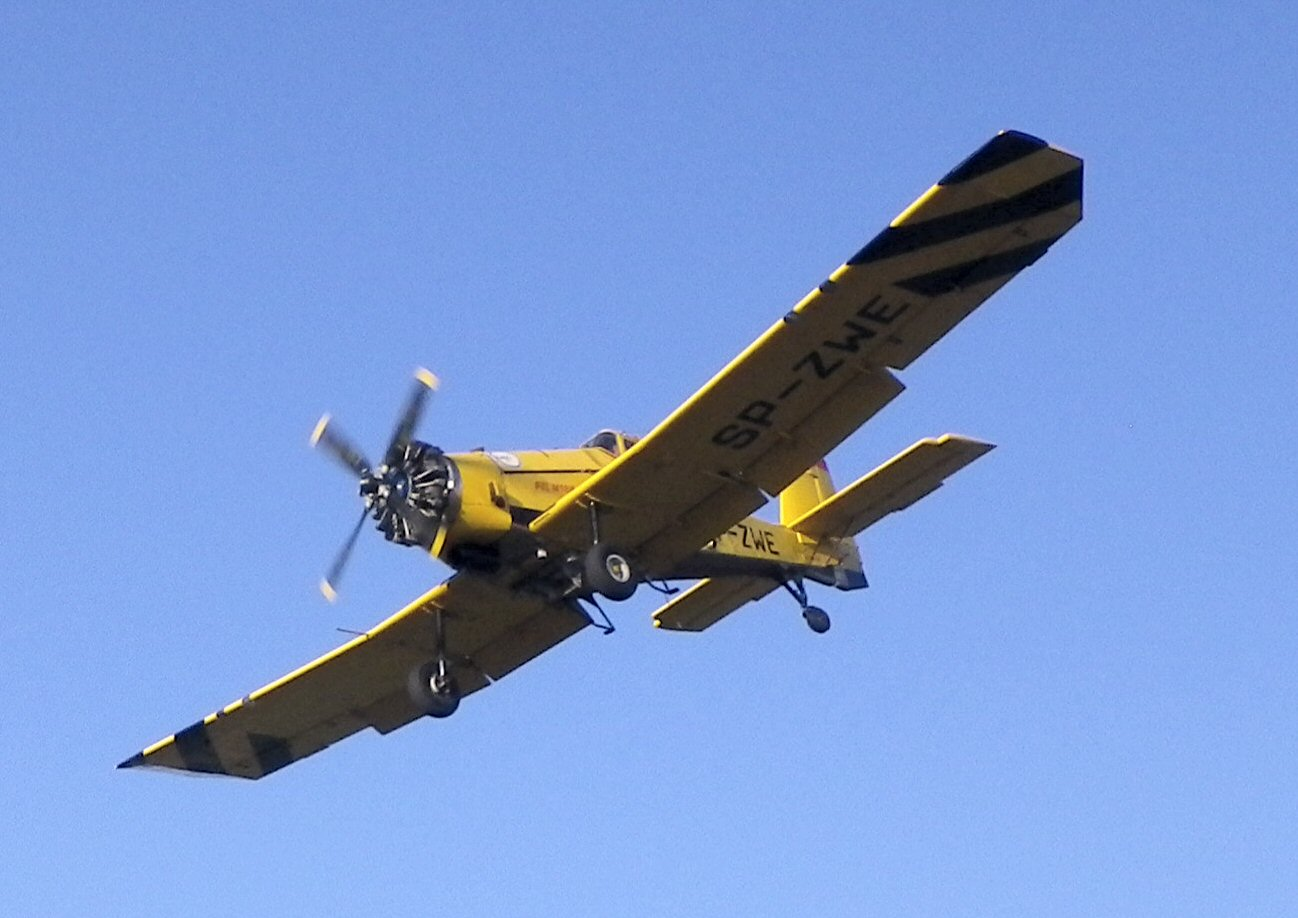
A M-18 fly over

M-18
original one-seat production version, now available for special orders only.
M-18A
two seater available from 1984 onwards. Allows a mechanic or chemical loader to be carried as a passenger to remote fields.
M-18AS
two-cockpit trainer version
M-18B
refined version of M-18A with increased capacity, flown in 1993.
M-18BS
two-cockpit trainer.
M-18C
version with more powerful 895 kW (1,200 hp) Kalisz K-9 engine. Flown in 1995 but not produced.
AII AVA-303
The M-18 is being built in Iran as the AVA-303.

== Operators ==
=== Military ===
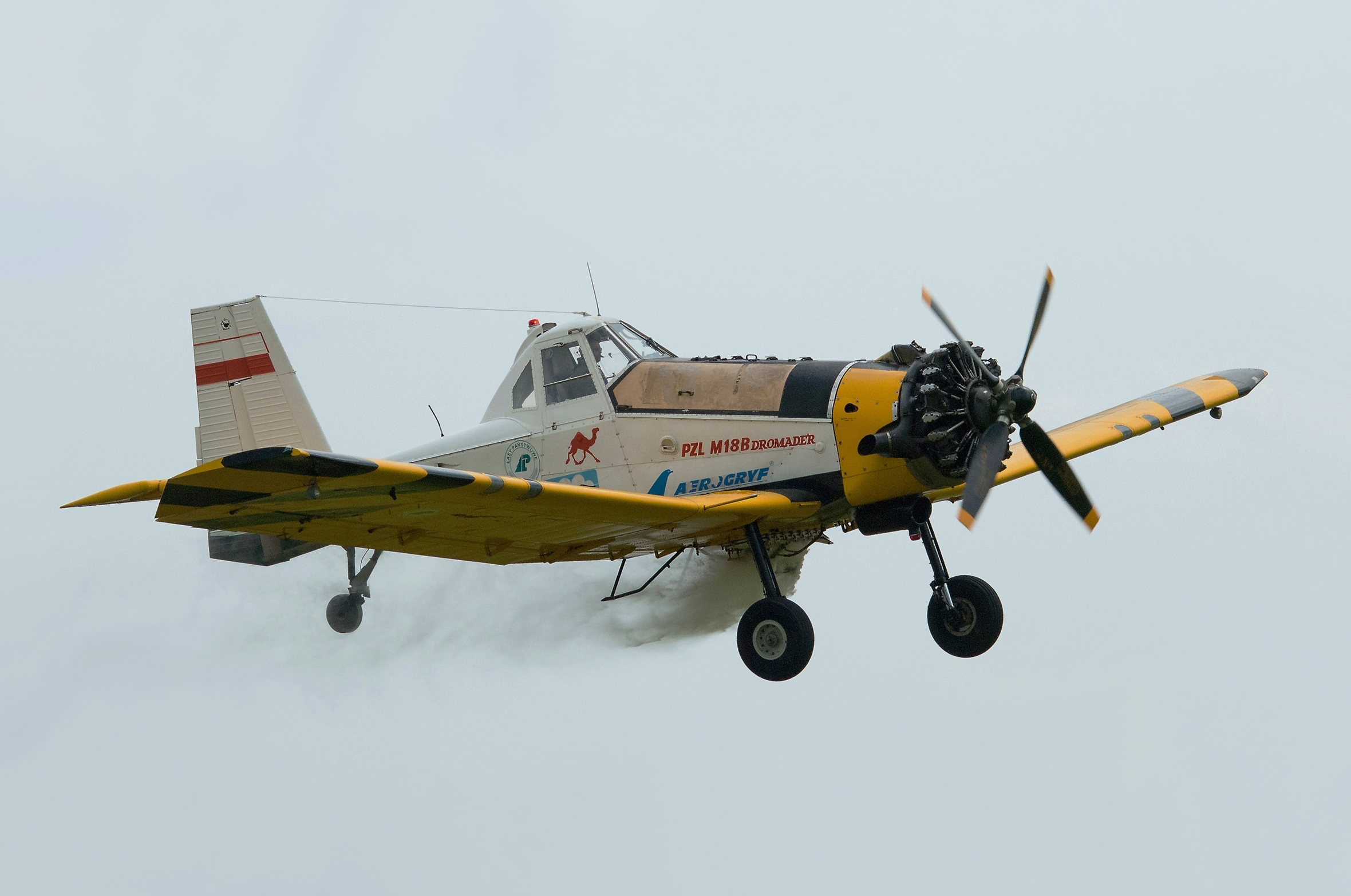
A M-18 Dromader water drop

Croatia

- Croatian Air Force - Former operator.

Greece

- Hellenic Air Force

Montenegro

- Montenegrin Air Force

Serbia - Agricultural Aviation

=== Civil ===
The Dromader is in service with aerial agriculture and other companies in many countries, operating in a variety of roles. The former Yugoslav Airline, Jugoslovenski Aerotransport, used it for cropspraying. Turkish Aeronautical Association uses it for firefighting.

== Specifications (M18B Dromader) ==
Data from Jane's All The World's Aircraft 2003–2004, Jane's all the World's Aircraft 2004-05,

General characteristics

- Crew: 1 / 2 (M18BS)
- Capacity: 2,500 L (660 US gal; 550 imp gal) liquid or 2,200 kg (4,900 lb) dry chemical in fibreglass hopper forward of the cockpit (smaller hopper in M18BS)
- Length: 9.47 m (31 ft 1 in)
- Wingspan: 17.7 m (58 ft 1 in)
- Height: 3.7 m (12 ft 2 in) to tailfin on ground
- Wing area: 40 m^{2} (430 sq ft)
- Aspect ratio: 7.8
- Airfoil: root:NACA 4416; tip:NACA 4412 outer wing panels
- Empty weight: 2,710 kg (5,975 lb)
- Max takeoff weight: 4,200 kg (9,259 lb)
- Fuel capacity: 510 kg (1,120 lb) max fuel weight
- Powerplant: 1 × PZL Kalisz ASz-621R 9-cylinder air-cooled radial piston engine, 731 kW (980 hp)
- Propellers: 4-bladed PZL Warszawa AW-2-30, 3.3 m (10 ft 10 in) diameter constant speed aluminium alloy propeller

Performance

- Maximum speed: 200 km/h (120 mph, 110 kn) with agricultural equipment
- Stall speed: 108 km/h (67 mph, 58 kn) flaps down
- Never exceed speed: 280 km/h (170 mph, 150 kn)
- Range: 970 km (600 mi, 520 nmi)
- Ferry range: 2,000 km (1,200 mi, 1,100 nmi) with hopper fuel tank
- Service ceiling: 6,500 m (21,300 ft)
- g limits: +3.4 / -1.4
- Rate of climb: 6.5 m/s (1,280 ft/min)
- Wing loading: 105 kg/m^{2} (22 lb/sq ft)
- Power/mass: 5.75 kg/kW (11.92 lb/hp)

== See also ==
Related development

- Rockwell Thrush Commander
- PZL M-24 Dromader Super

Aircraft of comparable role, configuration, and era

- Embraer EMB 202 Ipanema
- Piper PA-25 Pawnee
- PZL-106 Kruk
- Zlin Z-37 Cmelak
