= Yakovlev Yak-100 =

Yak-100

General information
- Type: Transport helicopter
- Designer: Yakovlev
- Status: Project cancelled
- Number built: 2

History
- Manufactured: Moscow Plant No. 115
- First flight: November 1948

Three-sided view of the Yak-100

The Yakovlev Yak-100 was a single-engine transport helicopter developed in the USSR in 1948. This was the Yakovlev Design Bureau's second helicopter.

== Design and development ==
The Yak-100 (initially designated Yak-22) was developed in direct competition with Mikhail Mil's Mi-1. Bearing a striking resemblance to the Sikorsky H-5, the Yak-100 had a conventional main and anti-torque rotor configuration driven by an Ivchenko AI-26GRFL radial piston engine. The pilot and crewman/passenger sat under a long greenhouse-style canopy with very good visibility.

Flight trials progressed quickly, with the almost ubiquitous vibration being tackled by moving the centre of gravity of the main rotor blades behind their flexural axes. Manufacturer's trials were completed in June 1950, with successful State acceptance trials following later that year.

Although successful in trials, the Yak-100 was not put into production because the equally successful Mi-1 had already been prepared for production before the Yak-100 had completed acceptance trials. The second prototype had three seats as well as other minor improvements.

== Specifications (Yak-100) ==
Data from OKB Yakovlev

General characteristics

- Crew: 2
- Capacity: + 3rd seat in second prototype
- Length: 13.91 m (45 ft 8 in)
- Empty weight: 1,690 kg (3,726 lb) first prototype; 1,805 kg (3,979 lb) second prototype
- Max takeoff weight: 2,090 kg (4,608 lb) first prototype; 2,180 kg (4,810 lb) second prototype
- Powerplant: 1 × Ivchenko AI-26GRFL , 313 kW (420 hp)
- Main rotor diameter: 14.5 m (47 ft 7 in)

Performance

- Maximum speed: 170 km/h (110 mph, 92 kn)
- Range: 325 km (202 mi, 175 nmi)
- Service ceiling: 5,250 m (17,220 ft) *Hovering ceiling: 2,720 m (8,920 ft)

== See also ==
Aircraft of comparable role, configuration, and era

- Sikorsky H-5
- Bristol Sycamore
- Weir W.9
- Bell 48
