= Transverse-rotor aircraft =

Type of rotorcraft

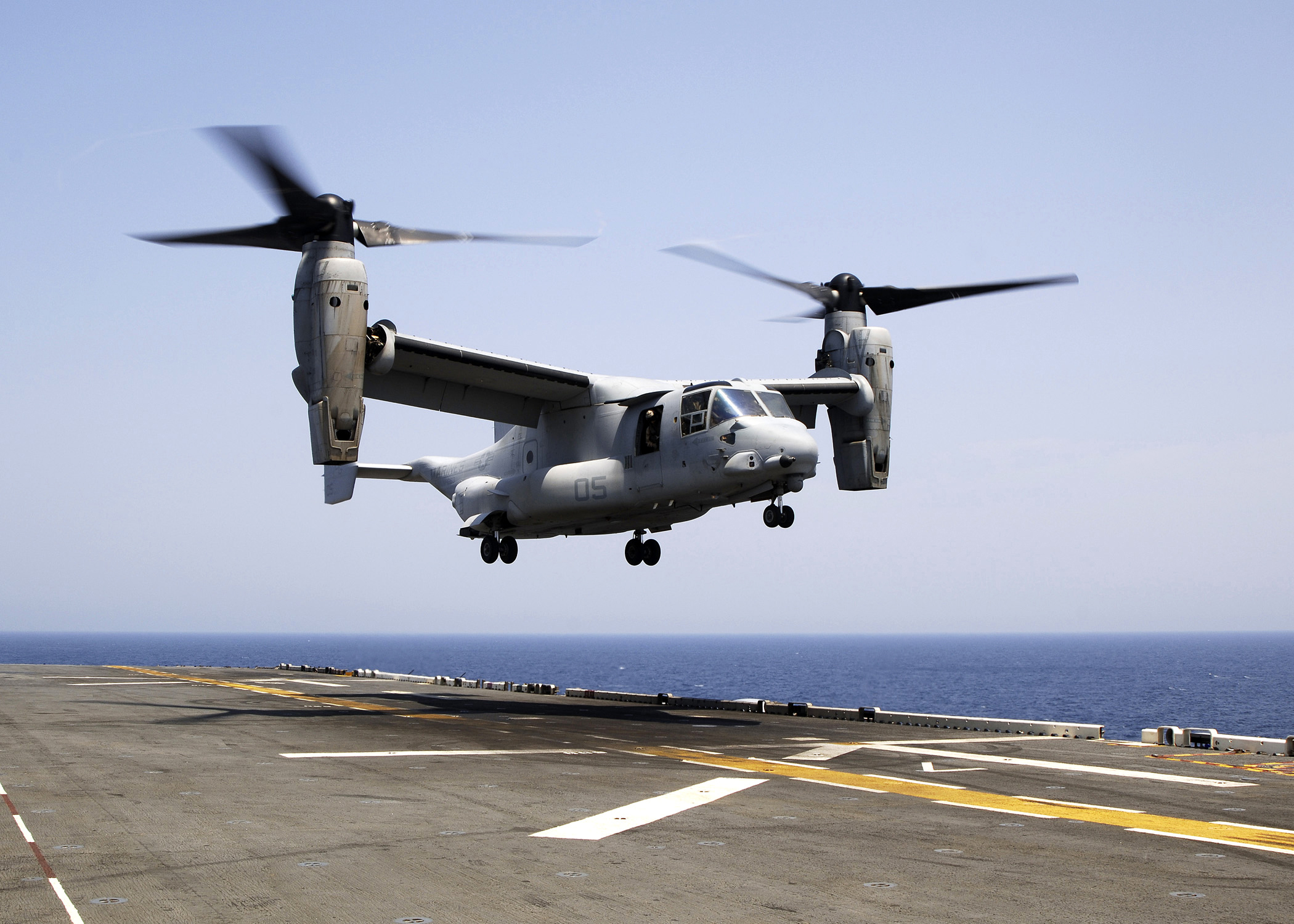
An MV-22B Osprey lands aboard the USS Iwo Jima (LHD-7).

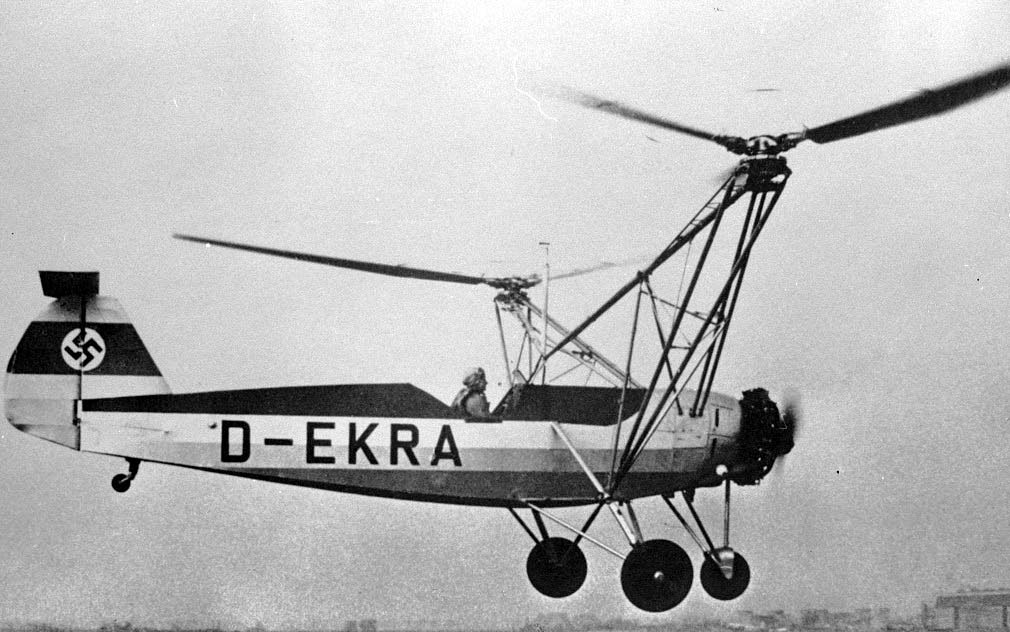
Hanna Reitsch in Fw 61 V2

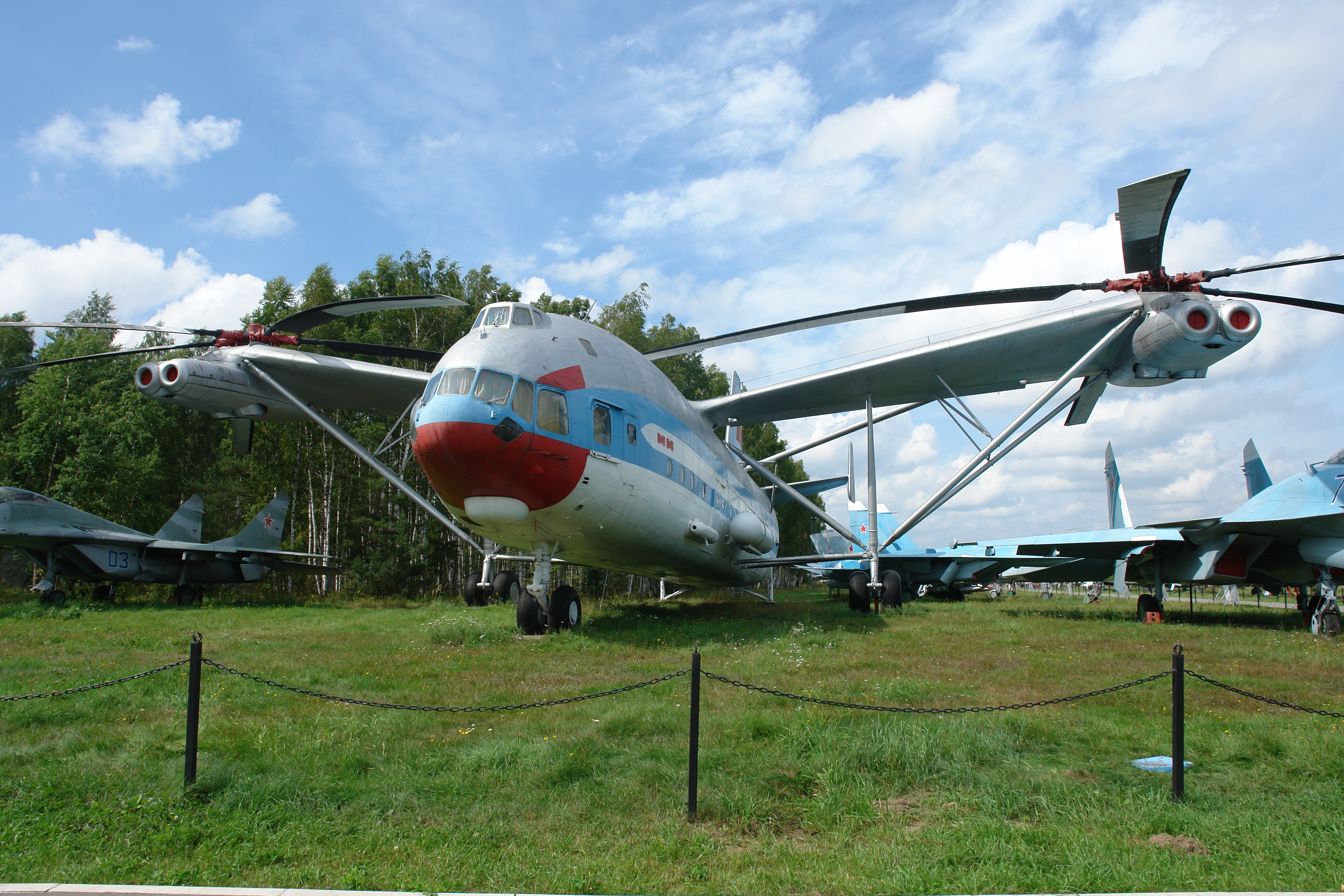
An Mil V-12 at Monino Central Air Force Museum (Moscow)

Animation

A transverse-rotor aircraft is an aircraft with two large horizontal rotor assemblies mounted side by side.

Single-rotor helicopters (unicopters) need an additional tail rotor or tail exhaust to neutralize the reactional angular momentum produced by the main rotor. Transverse rotor helicopters, however, use counter-rotating rotors, with each cancelling out the other's torque. Counter-rotating rotor blades also won't collide with and destroy each other if they flex into the other rotor's pathway. In addition, transverse rotor configuration has the advantage of higher payload with shorter blades, since there are two sets working to provide lift. Also, all of the power from the engines can be used for lift, whereas a single-rotor helicopter must divert part of its engine power to generate tail thrust.

Transverse rotor design with rotatable nacelles are known as tiltrotors while designs where the whole wing rotates are known as tiltwings.

== List of transverse rotor aircraft ==
=== Transverse-mounted helicopters ===
- Bratukhin B-11 (1948)
- Bratukhin G-3 (1946)
- Cierva W.5 (1938)
- Cierva W.11 Air Horse (1948) - a three rotor helicopter
- Firth Helicopter (1952)
- Focke-Achgelis Fa 223 Drache (1941)
- Focke-Wulf Fw 61 (1936)
- Kamov Ka-22 (1959)
- Kamov V-100 (1980s) - unbuilt project
- Landgraf H-2 (1944)
- McDonnell XHJH Whirlaway (1946)
- Mil Mi-12 (1967)
- Platt-LePage XR-1 (1941)

=== Transverse-mounted tiltrotors ===
- AgustaWestland AW609
- Bell Eagle Eye
- Bell XV-3
- Bell XV-15
- Bell Boeing V-22 Osprey
- Bell MV-75

=== Transverse-mounted tiltwings ===
- Canadair CL-84 Dynavert
- LTV XC-142

== See also ==
- Coaxial rotors
- Intermeshing rotors
- Rotorcraft
- Tandem rotors
- Tiltrotor
