= Planet Satellite =

Satellite
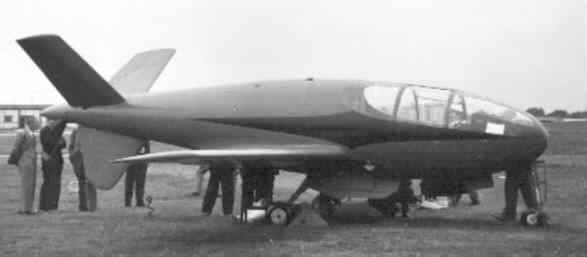
- Planet Satellite during testing

General information
- Type: Light aircraft
- Manufacturer: Planet Aircraft Ltd.
- Designer: Major Dundas Heenan
- Status: Experimental
- Number built: 1 (second prototype abandoned)

History
- Introduction date: Cancelled
- First flight: April 1949
- Retired: 1958
- Variant: Firth Helicopter (fuselage used)

The Planet Satellite was a British light aircraft of the late 1940s. Designed to exploit new technology, the aircraft was abandoned after two crashes, although the innovative fuselage was later incorporated into a helicopter prototype.

== Design and development ==
The Planet Satellite was designed by Major J. N. (John Nelson) Dundas Heenan, of Heenan, Winn and Steel, consulting engineers, 29 Clarges Street, London, W.1. Dundas had served in the RFC in WW1, retiring as acting Major in 1919 and had then worked at the family firm of Heenan & Froude, leaving in 1935 when the parent company went bankrupt. He served on the British Air Commission to North America in World War II, and communicated many of Frank Whittle's reports to the USAAF, which eventually led to the Bell P-59 Airacomet, the first US jet aircraft.

The Satellite was a futuristic-looking four-seater aircraft built of Elektron alloy, a 90% magnesium alloy, in a true monocoque 'teardrop' shaped fuselage with no internal reinforced structure. The wings were also skinned with sheet elektron. The UK manufacturing rights for Elektron were owned by F. A. Hughes and Co., which had acquired the license in 1923 from IG Farben in Germany. Hughes & Co. had been fully-owned since 1947 by The Distillers Company Ltd., (makers of Gordon's Gin and Johnnie Walker Whisky), who decided to finance the Satellite: a partnership established the Planet Aircraft Company, which operated as a subsidiary of a liquor company.

The Satellite was powered by a 250 hp de Havilland Gipsy Queen 31 mounted amidships driving a two-blade Aeromatic "pusher" airscrew in the tail, with cooling air drawn by a fan through a flush slot on the roof of the fuselage. Other notable features included a 'butterfly' V-tail and a retractable tricycle landing gear with some Elektron components, with the nosewheel retracting into a reinforced keel made of solid Elektron that ran the length of the underside of the fuselage.

Breaking with conventional design and manufacturing conventions, Heenan declared in the July 1948 Aviation News issue, that the 400 drawings made were in stark contrast with the standard of approximately 3,000 drawings required for a project of that complexity.

Built in the Robinson Redwing factory at Purley Way, Croydon, Surrey in 1947, the first prototype was taken to Redhill Aerodrome in 1948. The sleek light aircraft appeared at the S.B.A.C. show at Farnborough Airshow in September 1948 and received the registration G-ALOI in April 1949.

== Testing and evaluation ==
The Chief Test Pilot at RAE Farnborough, Group Captain H. J. Wilson (holder of the World speed Record in the Gloster Meteor), after several long runs down the runway, managed to get the Satellite airborne at Blackbushe Airport. The first "hop" was followed by the collapse of the undercarriage. After repairs, the prototype was flown off the ground and after reaching an altitude of barely 20 ft was put down on the ground gently but nonetheless, the undercarriage again collapsed, and this time the main keel had been cracked by the force of the landing. The conclusion of the Air Registration Board investigating the incident was that the aircraft had inadequate stress analysis and would require complete re-stressing and redesign.

The manufacturers had already begun the production of a second prototype but having already invested £100,000, and facing a likely cost of a further £50,000 to redesign the Satellite, chose to wind down the program with no further attempts to fly the Planet Satellite.

The second prototype, registered G-ALXP was abandoned but the completed fuselage was incorporated into the Firth Helicopter FH-01/4, (also designed by Heenan) built in 1952 at Thame, Oxfordshire. The Firth Helicopter was abandoned without flying. It was presented to the College of Aeronautics at Cranfield in 1955.

The single "flying" Satellite languished at Redhill until 1958 when it was unceremoniously broken up.

== Specifications (Planet Satellite - performance estimated) ==
Data from Heavenly Body

General characteristics

- Crew: 1
- Capacity: 4 passengers
- Length: 26 ft 3 in (8.00 m)
- Wingspan: 33 ft 6 in (10.21 m)
- Height: 9 ft 3 in (2.82 m)
- Wing area: 153 sq ft (14.2 m^{2})
- Airfoil: NACA 23000 series
- Empty weight: 1,600 lb (726 kg)
- Gross weight: 2,905 lb (1,318 kg)
- Fuel capacity: 56 imp gal (67 US gal; 250 L)
- Powerplant: 1 × de Havilland Gipsy Queen 31 air-cooled, six-cylinder inline engine, 250 hp (190 kW)
- Propellers: 2-bladed Aeromatic variable-pitch propeller, 6 ft 6 in (1.98 m) diameter

Performance

- Maximum speed: 208 mph (335 km/h, 181 kn)
- Cruise speed: 191 mph (307 km/h, 166 kn)
- Stall speed: 62 mph (100 km/h, 54 kn) (maximum loading)
- Range: 1,000 mi (1,600 km, 870 nmi)
- Service ceiling: 22,000 ft (6,700 m) (absolute ceiling)
- Rate of climb: 1,450 ft/min (7.4 m/s)
