= Landgraf H-2 =

Prototype helicopter

H-2

General information
- Type: Single-seat twin-rotor helicopter
- Manufacturer: Landgraf Helicopter Company
- Designer: Fred Landgraf
- Number built: 1

History
- First flight: 2 November 1944

The Landgraf H-2 was an American single-seat twin-rotor helicopter designed by Fred Landgraf and built by the Landgraf Helicopter Company of Los Angeles, California. Although awarded a development contract by the United States Army, it was not developed and was overtaken by more advanced designs.

== Design and development ==
Fred Landgraf formed the Landgraf Helicopter Company in September 1943 to develop and manufacture the H-2. It had an enclosed structure for one pilot and an 85 hp (63 kW) radial engine driving two rotors, each rotor fitted to a short boom on each side of the fuselage. It had a fixed tricycle landing gear. The H-2 first flew on 2 November 1944 and the company was awarded a development contract by the United States Army. It was not developed or bought and the company ceased operations by the end of the 1940s.

Unlike conventional helicopters, the H-2 used a tension-rod drive system to drive the side-by-side rotors. Control of blade pitch was also unconventional, with the blade shells rotating freely about the spars, controlled by ailerons near the tips.

== Specifications ==
Data from

General characteristics

- Crew: one
- Capacity: 186 lb (84 kg)
- Length: 15 ft (4.6 m) fuselage only
- Wingspan: 12 ft 2 in (3.7 m) outrigger wings
- Width: 29 ft 10 in (9.1 m) including rotors
- Powerplant: 1 × Pobjoy R 7-cyl. air-cooled radial piston engine, 85 hp (63 kW)
- Main rotor diameter: 2 × 18 ft 1 in (5.5 m)

Performance

- Maximum speed: 100 mph (160 km/h, 87 kn)

== See also ==
Aircraft of comparable role, configuration, and era

- Firth Helicopter

Related lists

- List of rotorcraft
- Transverse rotors

== Bibliography ==
- Taylor, Michael J. H. (1989). Jane's Encyclopedia of Aviation. London: Studio Editions.
- The Illustrated Encyclopedia of Aircraft (Part Work 1982–1985). Orbis Publishing. p. 2280.
