= Aerial application =

Dispersal of chemicals from aircraft or helicopters

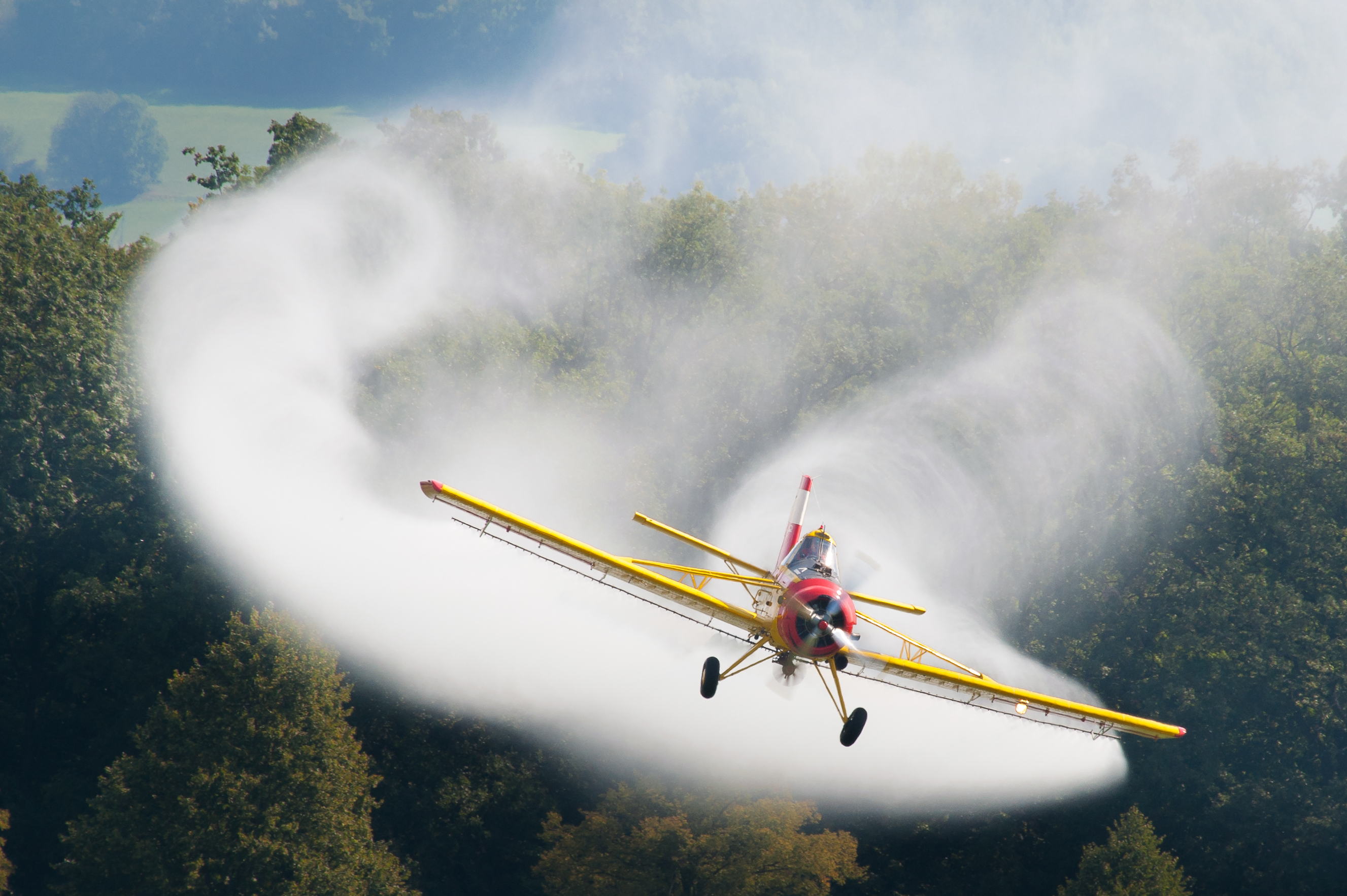
A PZL-106 Kruk crop duster applying a fine mist

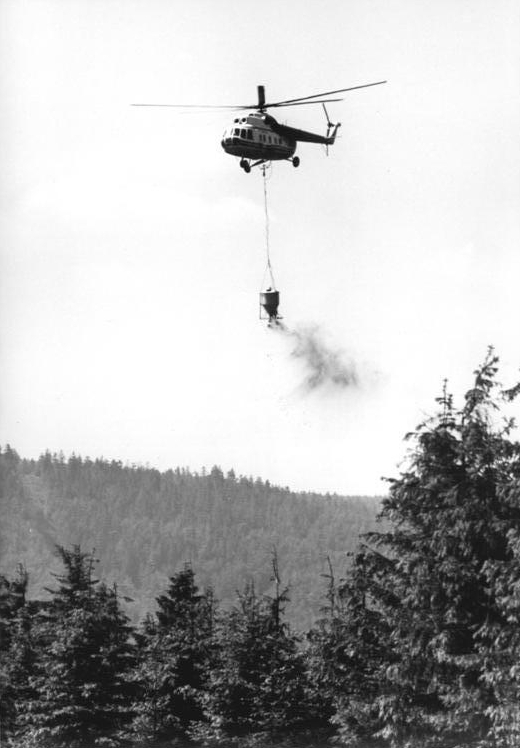
A Mil Mi-8 spreading fertilizer

Aerial application, sometimes known as crop dusting, involves application of crop protection products to crops from an agricultural aircraft. Planting certain types of seed are also included in aerial application. The specific spreading of fertilizer is also known as aerial topdressing in some countries. In the USA in 2018 about 25% of pesticides used on commercial farms, and about 100% of forestry products are applied aerially. The European Union severely limited aerial application of pesticides in 2009 and other products because of environmental and public health hazards like spray drift.

Agricultural aircraft are highly specialized, purpose-built aircraft. Today's agricultural aircraft are often powered by turbine engines of up to 1,500 shp (1,100 kW) and can carry as much as 800 US gallons (3,000 L) of crop protection product. Helicopters are sometimes used, and some aircraft serve double duty as water bombers in areas prone to wildfires. These aircraft are referred to as SEAT, or "single engine air tankers."

== History ==
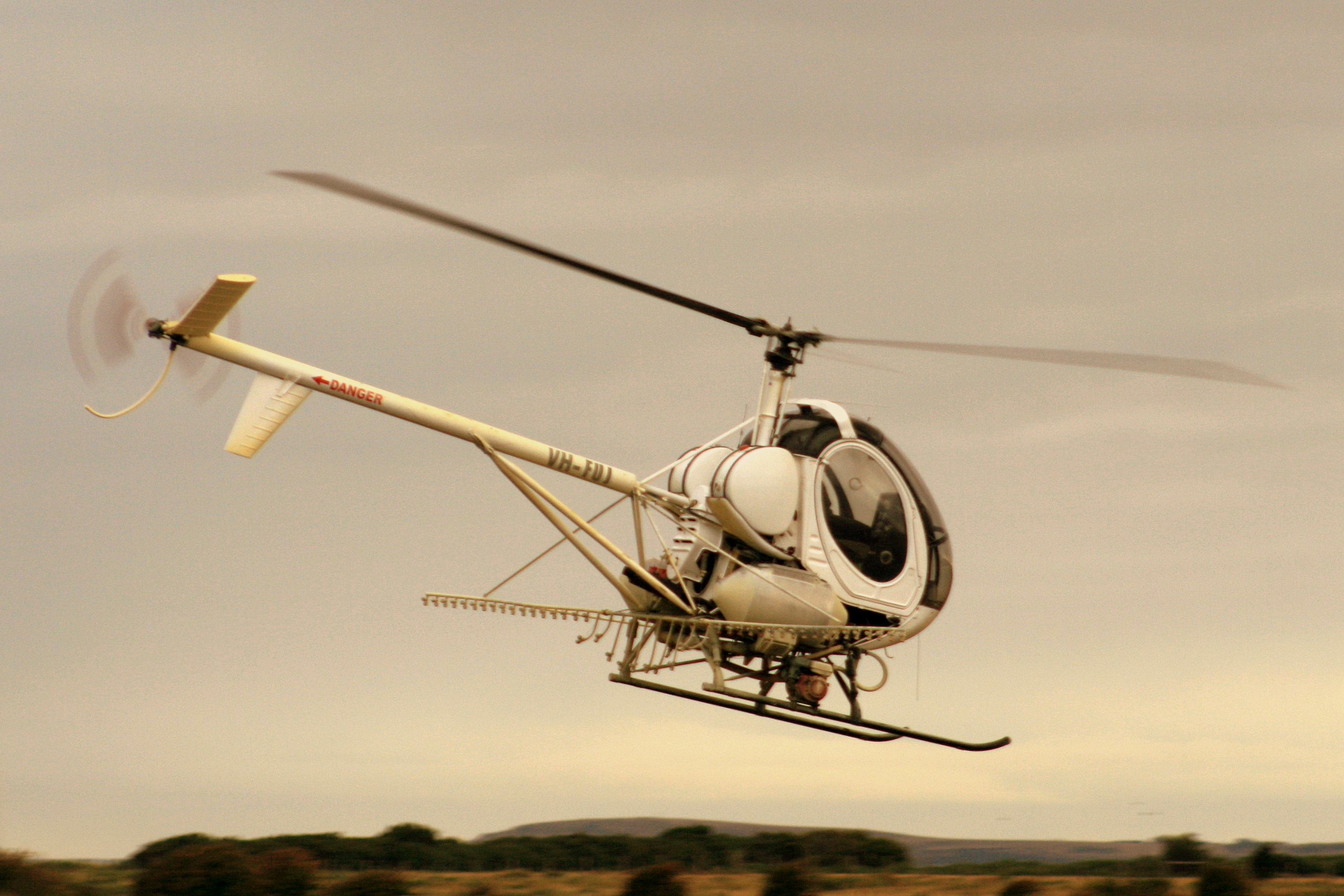
A Schweizer S269C fitted with spraying booms

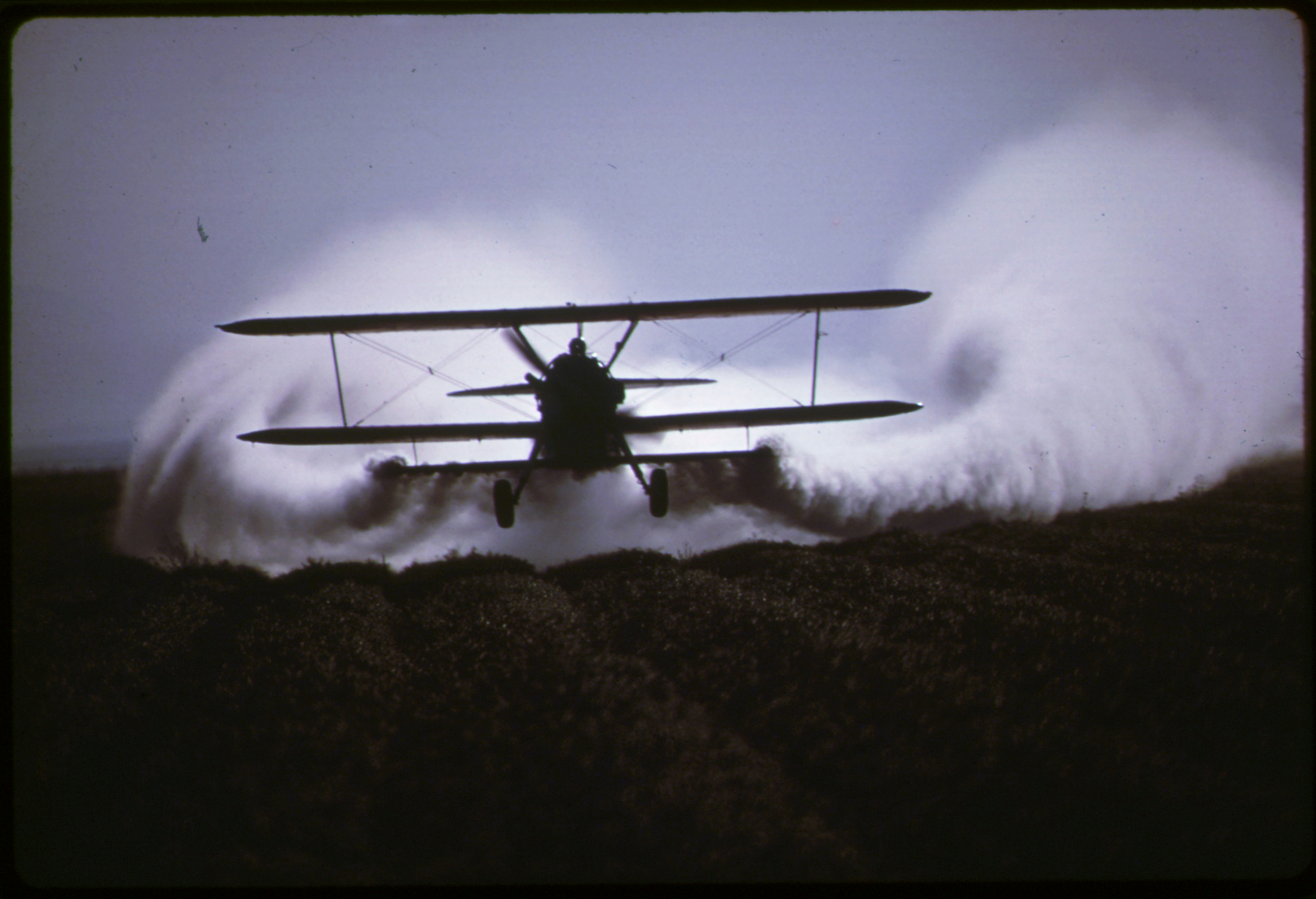
Altitude and wind affect dispersion

=== Aerial seed sowing ===
The first known aerial application of agricultural materials was by John Chaytor, who in 1906 spread seed over a swamped valley floor in Wairoa, New Zealand, using a hot air balloon with mobile tethers. Aerial sowing of seed still continues to this day with cover crop applications and rice planting.

=== Crop dusting ===
The first known use of a heavier-than-air machine to disperse products occurred on August 3, 1921. Crop dusting was developed under the joint efforts of the U.S. Department of Agriculture and the U.S. Army Signal Corps' research station at McCook Field in Dayton, Ohio. Under the direction of McCook engineer Etienne Dormoy, a United States Army Air Service Curtiss JN4 Jenny piloted by John A. Macready was modified at McCook Field to spread lead arsenate to kill catalpa sphinx caterpillars at a catalpa farm near Troy, Ohio in the United States. The first test was considered highly successful.

The first commercial cropdusting operations began in 1924 in Macon, Georgia by Huff-Daland Crop Dusting, which was co-founded by McCook Field test pilot Lt. Harold R. Harris. Use of insecticide and fungicide for crop dusting slowly spread in the Americas and, to a lesser extent, other nations in the 1930s. The name 'crop dusting' originated here, as actual dust was spread across the crops. Today, aerial applicators use liquid crop protection products in very small doses.

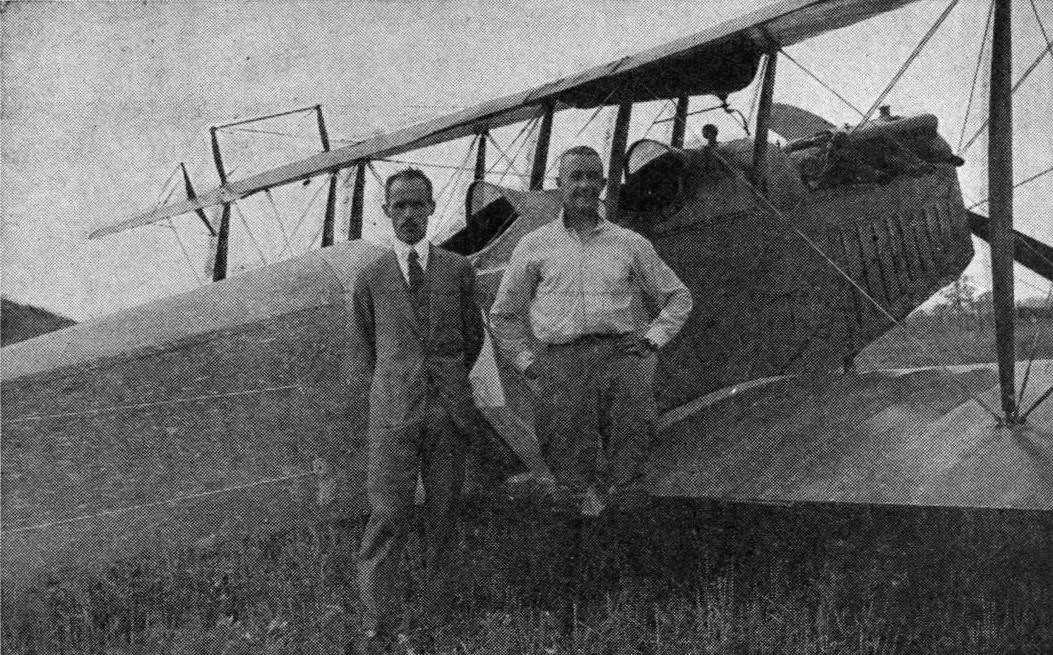
Lt. Macready (right) and McCook Field engineer E. Dormoy (left) in front of the 1st crop duster airplane (August 3, 1921)

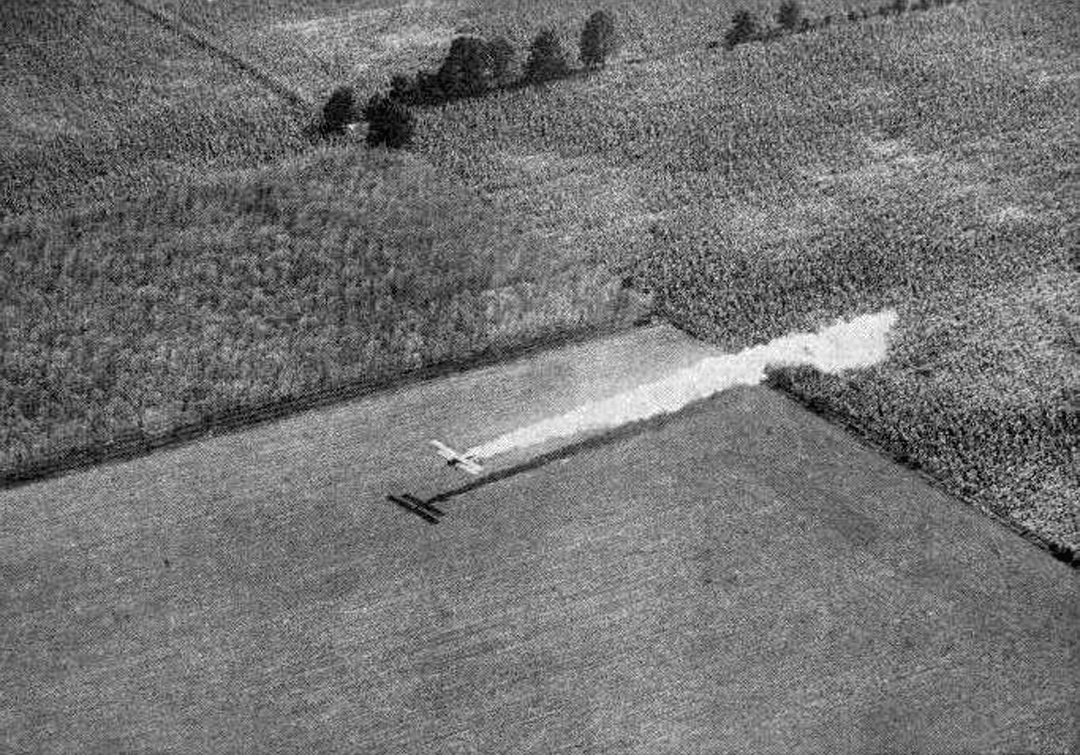
First crop dusting used a Curtiss JN Jenny

=== Top dressing ===
Aerial topdressing is the aerial application of fertilisers over farmland using agricultural aircraft. It was developed in New Zealand in the 1940s and rapidly adopted elsewhere in the 1950s.

=== Purpose-built aircraft ===
In 1951, Leland Snow designed the first aircraft specifically built for aerial application, the S-1. In 1957, The Grumman G-164 Ag-Cat was the first aircraft designed by a major company for agricultural aviation. Currently, the most common agricultural aircraft are the Air Tractor, Cessna Ag-wagon, Gippsland GA200, Grumman Ag Cat, PZL-106 KRUK, M-18 Dromader, PAC Fletcher, Piper PA-36 Pawnee Brave, Embraer EMB 202 Ipanema, and Rockwell Thrush Commander, but multi-purpose helicopters are also used.

=== Unmanned aerial application ===
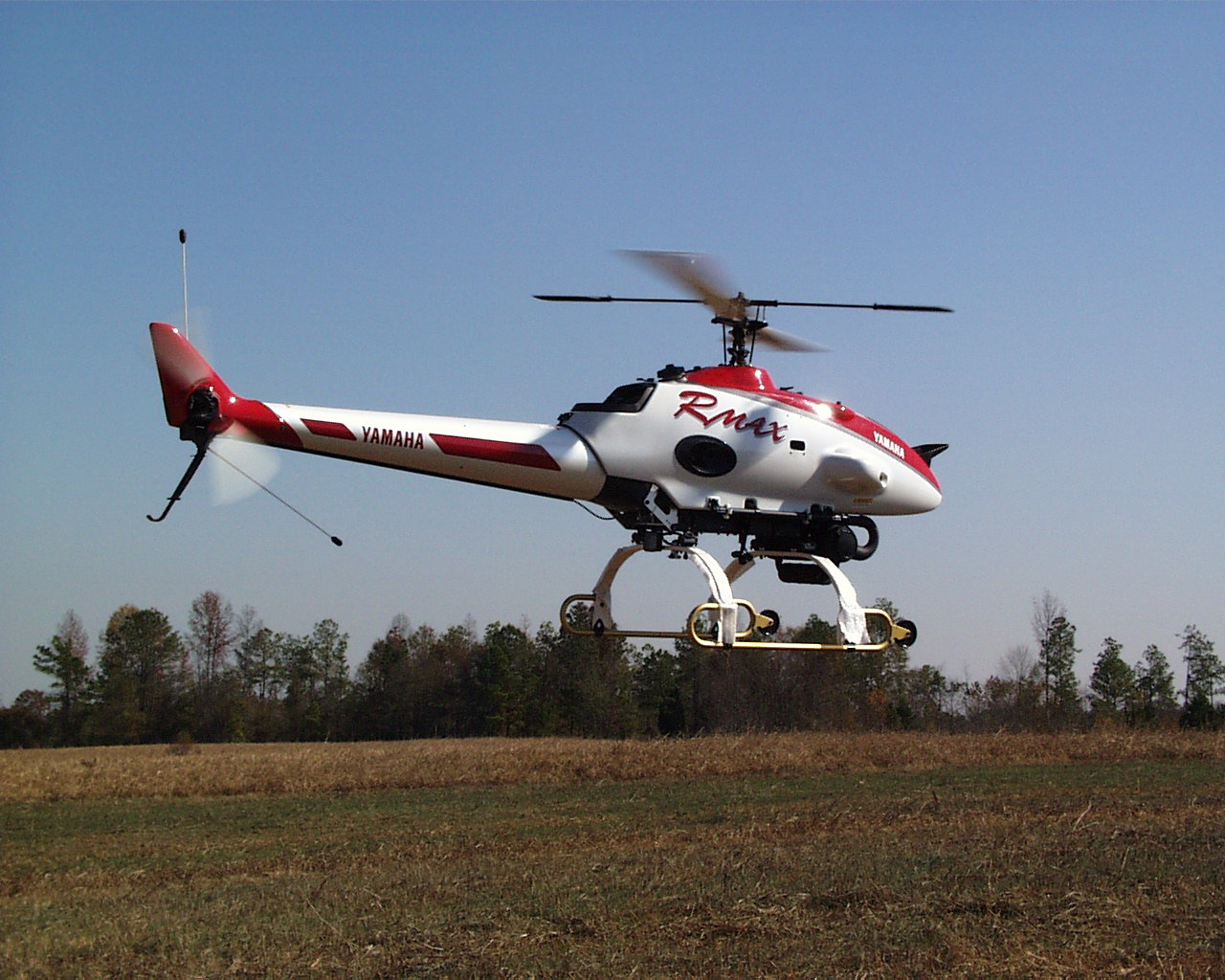
A Yamaha R-MAX, a UAV commonly used for aerial application in Japan

Since the late 1990s, unmanned aerial vehicles have also been used for agricultural spraying. This phenomenon started in Japan and South Korea, where mountainous terrain and relatively small family-owned farms required lower-cost and higher-precision spraying. As of 2014, the use of UAV crop dusters, such as the Yamaha R-MAX, is being expanded to the United States for use in spraying at vineyards.

== Concerns ==
The National Institute of Environmental Health Sciences keeps track of relevant research. Historically, there has been concerns about the effects of aerial applications of pesticides and the chemicals' effects as they spread in the air. For example, the aerial application of mancozeb is likely a source of concern for pregnant women.

=== Bans ===
Since the 1970s, multiple countries started to limit or ban the aerial application of pesticides, fertilizers, and other products out of environmental and public health concerns, in particular from spray drift. Most notably, in 2009, the European Union prohibited aerial spraying of pesticides with a few highly-restricted exceptions in article 9 of Directive 2009/128/EC of the European Parliament and of the Council establishing a framework for Community action to achieve the sustainable use of pesticides, which effectively ended most aerial application in all member states and overseas territories.

=== Guidelines ===
The United States Environmental Protection Agency (EPA) provides guideline documents and hosts webinars about best practices for aerial application.

In 2010, the United States Forest Service collected public comments to use within a Draft Environmental Impact Statement (DEIS), which was developed because the Montana Federal District Court ruled that aerial application of fire retardants during wildfires violated the Endangered Species Act.

== See also ==
- Pesticide application
- Pesticide drift
- Sprayer
- Ultra-low volume spray application
- Aerial spraying of herbicides in Colombia
