= Yamaha R-MAX =

Japanese unmanned helicopter

R-MAX
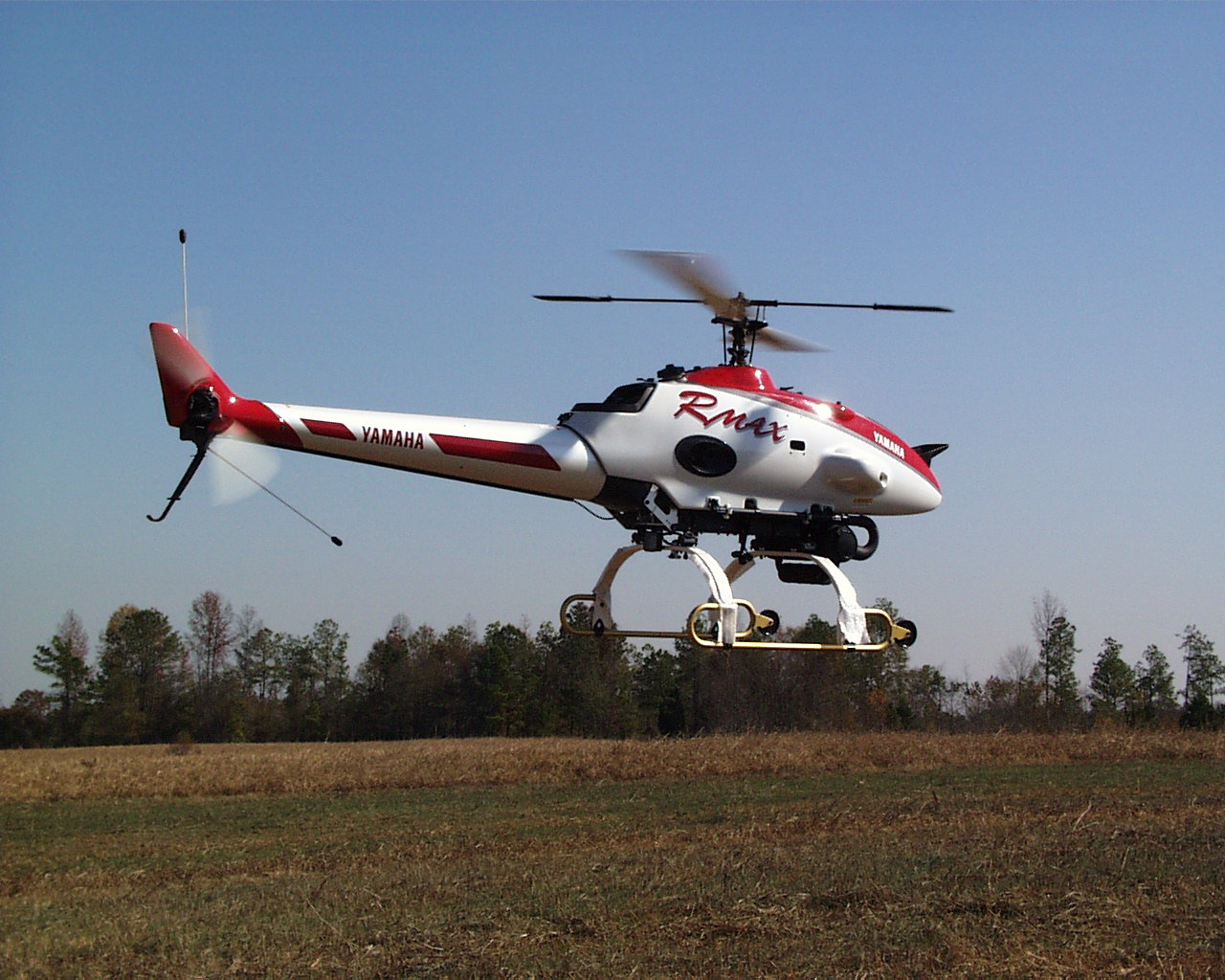
- An R-MAX in flight in 2014

General information
- Type: Unmanned aerial vehicle
- National origin: Japan
- Manufacturer: Yamaha Motor Company

History
- Developed from: Yamaha R-50

The Yamaha R-MAX is a Japanese unmanned helicopter developed by the Yamaha Motor Company in the 1990s. The gasoline-powered aircraft has a two-bladed rotor and is remote-controlled by a line-of-sight user. It was designed primarily for agricultural use, and is capable of precise aerial spraying of crops. The R-MAX has been used in Japan and abroad for agriculture and a variety of other roles, including aerial surveys, reconnaissance, disaster response and technology development.

== Development ==
The Yamaha R-MAX and its predecessor, the Yamaha R-50, were developed in the 1990s in response to demand in the Japanese market for aerial agricultural spraying. Fixed-wing manned crop dusters had been in use in Japan for many years, but the small size of most Japanese farms meant that this method was inefficient. Manned helicopters were sometimes used for spraying, but were very expensive. The R-MAX allowed much more precise small-scale spraying, at a lower cost and lower risk than manned aircraft. The R-MAX was approved for operation in the United States by the Federal Aviation Administration in 2015.

== Operational history ==
As of 2015, the R-MAX fleet has conducted over two million hours of flying time in agricultural roles and several other capacities, including aerial sensing, photography, academic research, and military applications.

=== Volcano observation ===
In the spring of 2000, the Japanese government requested the use of an R-MAX to observe the eruption of Mount Usu, which had been dormant for 22 years, as close observation of the volcano was deemed too dangerous for manned helicopters. The R-MAX allowed scientific observers to spot and measure build-ups of volcanic ash which would have otherwise been missed, and improved the observers' ability to predict hazardous volcanic mudslides.

=== Fukushima nuclear disaster ===
Yamaha R-MAXs were used in the wake of the 2011 Tōhoku earthquake and tsunami to monitor radiation levels around the site of the Fukushima nuclear disaster from inside the "no-entry" zone.

=== Research ===
The R-MAX has been used by several universities worldwide for guidance and automatic control research. In 2002, Georgia Tech's UAV Research Facility began using a Yamaha R-MAX for research into autonomous aerial guidance, navigation, and control systems. Carnegie Mellon University, the University of California Berkeley, UC Davis and Virginia Tech have also used R-MAX units for research.

== Variants ==
In May 2014, Yamaha partnered with the American defense firm Northrop Grumman to produce the fully autonomous R-Bat variant of the R-MAX which they see having military and civilian applications.

== Specifications (R-MAX) ==
General characteristics

- Length: 3.63 m (11 ft 11 in)
- Width: 0.72 m (2 ft 4 in)
- Height: 1.08 m (3 ft 7 in)
- Empty weight: 64 kg (141 lb)
- Max takeoff weight: 94 kg (207 lb)
- Maximum payload: 28–31 kg (62–68 lb)
- Powerplant: 1 × water-cooled 2-cylinder 2-stroke, 0.246 L (15.01 cu in)
- Main rotor diameter: 3.115 m (10 ft 3 in)

Performance

- Endurance: 1 hour

Avionics

- Control system: Yamaha Attitude Control System (YACS)
