= Firth Helicopter =

FH-01/4 "Atlantic"
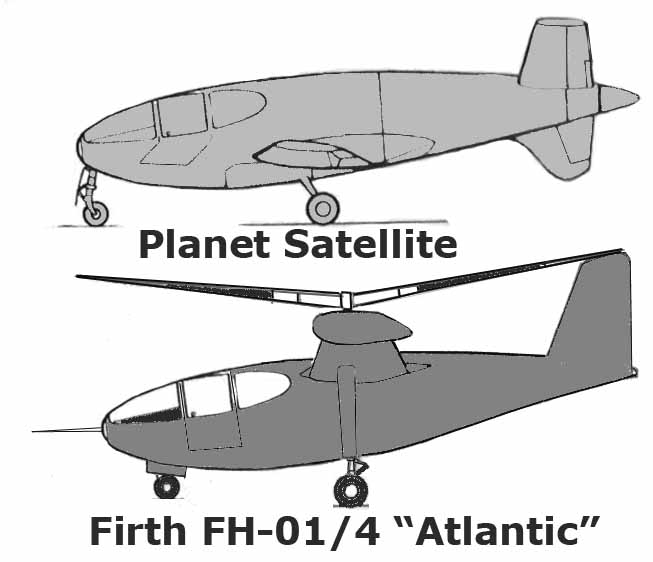
- Firth Helicopter and Planet Satellite side-views showing derivation

General information
- Type: Helicopter
- Manufacturer: Firth Helicopters Ltd.
- Designer: Major Dundas Heenan
- Status: Experimental
- Number built: 1

History
- Introduction date: Cancelled
- Retired: 1954
- Variant: Planet Satellite

The Firth Helicopter was a British helicopter of the early 1950s. Designed to exploit new outrigger rotor technology, the helicopter was abandoned during construction.

== Design and development ==
Based on the designs of American engineer Fred Landgraf who established the Landgraf Helicopter Corporation in the early years of the Second World War, The Firth Helicopter was more of a "proof-of-concept" aircraft than a true prototype. Firth Helicopters Ltd. had obtained rights to the Landgraf patents regarding a concept which involved twin outrigger pylons carrying three-bladed rotors fitted with ailerons to change direction.

The design team of Heenan, Winn and Steele, led by Major J.N. Dundas Heenan who had been previously involved in a similarly unorthodox 1948 aircraft project, the Planet Satellite, utilized the fuselage of the second Satellite prototype, registered G-ALXP in 1951. The small, streamlined Satellite monocoque fuselage consisted of panels of an extremely light magnesium-zirconium alloy. The original contours tapered to a butterfly tail that was eliminated and replaced by a single fin to be topped by a tailplane in a "T tail" design; surprisingly, the Satellite fuselage was integrated seamlessly into the new helicopter planform.

The Satellite's four-seat configuration allowed for a larger helicopter than the Landgraf H-2/H-3 series (the H-4 would have been a 5/8 passenger helicopter) which had been the basis of the first Landgraf concept helicopters. The twin non-articulated type rotors were powered by two 145 hp de Havilland Gipsy Majors.

== Testing and evaluation ==
In 1952, Firth Helicopters began the construction of the FH-01/4 (still registered as G-ALXP) at their Thame, UK facilities. Although the majority of the work had been completed, technical problems with excessive weight on the anterior part of the rotors seemed to be unsurmountable given the limited financial resources of the company. Gradually work ground to a halt without final equipment being installed and no hope for a first flight. The Firth FH-01/4 was presented to the College of Aeronautics at Cranfield in 1955.

== Specifications (Firth Helicopter) ==
Heavenly Body

- Length: 26 ft 3 in
- Height: 9 ft 3 in

== See also ==
Aircraft of comparable role, configuration, and era

- Landgraf H-2
