= PZL M-24 Dromader Super =

Polish agricultural aircraft prototype

M-24 Dromader Super

General information
- Type: Agricultural aircraft
- National origin: Poland
- Manufacturer: WSK-Mielec
- Status: Prototype
- Number built: 4 prototypes

History
- First flight: July 20, 1987
- Developed from: PZL-Mielec M-18 Dromader

The PZL M-24 Dromader Super (a.k.a. Super Dromedary) is a single engine agricultural aircraft, developed in the 1980s by the WSK-Mielec (later PZL-Mielec) from the PZL-Mielec M-18 Dromader. It did not progress beyond the prototyping stage.

== Development ==
The plane was developed as a bigger and more capable variant of the successful agricultural plane PZL-Mielec M-18 Dromader. Some components of the M-18 were used it its construction, but it is generally bigger and stronger, with a more powerful engine. The wings were fitted with a new central section of a larger span.

The first prototype of the M-24 flew on July 20, 1987, and was powered with a 736 kW (987 hp) Shvetsov ASh-62IR radial engine. The second prototype, designated M-24B, was powered by the Polish-designed 890 kW (1,200 hp) PZL-Kalisz K-9AA radial engine and first flew in 1988. The third prototype, M-24T, was powered by the Pratt & Whitney PT6A-45AG turboprop engine. Four prototypes were built, but the type did not enter production.

The experience with the M-24 was utilised in creating the M-18B variant of the M-18, powered with the PZL K-9 engine, first flown in 1993.

== Design ==
The aircraft is a metal low-wing cantilever monoplane, conventional in layout. It has a monocoque fuselage, covered with duralumin. The wings are composed of three parts, fitted with flaps and slats. There is a two-seat cabin (pilot and optional passenger or mechanic, in tandem), placed high. The single radial engine has a four blade propeller. Behind the engine is an internal 2,700-litre (590 imp gal; 710 US gal) tank for chemicals or water. A fuel tank holds 1,400 litres (310 imp gal; 370 US gal).

The plane has exchangeable sets of equipment for spraying, cropdusting or fire extinguishing. It has conventional fixed landing gear with a tail wheel.

== Specifications (M-24B) ==
Data from Jane's all the World's Aircraft 1989–90

General characteristics

- Crew: 1, pilot
- Capacity: 1 passenger and 2,700 L (710 US gal; 590 imp gal) / 2,000 kg (4,400 lb) of chemicals
- Length: 10.8 m (35 ft 5 in)
- Wingspan: 19.9 m (65 ft 3 in)
- Height: 4.3 m (14 ft 1 in) in rigging position

3.78 m (12.4 ft) tail down

- Wing area: 45 m^{2} (480 sq ft)
- Aspect ratio: 8.8
- Empty weight: 2,870 kg (6,327 lb)
- Max takeoff weight: 5,000 kg (11,023 lb) and Max landing weight

5,500 kg (12,100 lb) (restricted)

- Powerplant: 1 × PZL ASz-62IR 9-cylinder air-cooled radial piston engine, 750 kW (1,000 hp)
- Propellers: 4-bladed PZL constant-speed propeller

Performance

- Cruise speed: 220 km/h (140 mph, 120 kn)
- Stall speed: 110 km/h (68 mph, 59 kn) flaps down
- Service ceiling: 4,000 m (13,000 ft)
- g limits: +3.5 -1.4
- Rate of climb: 5 m/s (980 ft/min) clean

3 m/s (590 ft/min) with agricultural equipment

- Wing loading: 111.1 kg/m^{2} (22.8 lb/sq ft) (normal)

122.2 kg/m^{2} (25.0 lb/sq ft) (restricted)

- Power/mass: 0.149 kW/kg (0.091 hp/lb) (normal)

0.1355 kW/kg (0.0824 hp/lb) (restricted)

- Take-off to 50 m (160 ft): 340 m (1,120 ft)
- Landing from 50 m (160 ft): 470 m (1,540 ft)

== See also ==
Related development

- PZL-Mielec M-18 Dromader
- PZL-Mielec M-21 Dromader Mini
- Ayres Thrush
