= Bratukhin B-11 =

B-11
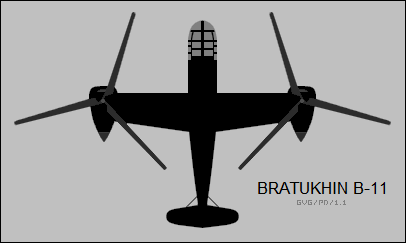
- Top view of a B-11.

General information
- Type: Transport helicopter
- National origin: Soviet Union
- Manufacturer: Bratukhin
- Number built: 2

History
- First flight: 1948

The Bratukhin B-11 was a prototype Soviet twin-rotor transport helicopter and the last design of the Bratukhin aircraft design bureau to be built.

== Development ==
The B-11 was similar to the design bureau's earlier B-5, a twin-rotor helicopter, with each rotor driven by an Ivchenko AI-26 radial engine. Each engine was housed in a pod on an outrigger with the related rotor above. Designed for a 1947 air force design competition for a general-purpose helicopter. Two prototypes were built and flown in June 1948, test flights showed a problem with rotor-blade stall at high speed and high resonant vibrations in the whole helicopter. In August 1948 the first prototype was grounded for investigation, but limited testing carried on with the second to find the causes of the problems.

On 13 December 1948 a blade on the right-hand rotor of the second prototype broke, and the subsequent crash killed the two crew. The prototype was then re-designed and re-built to overcome the problems, but when flying resumed in 1949 the stall occurred again. Bratukhin further modified the helicopter in May 1950 with new rotor blades, but development was soon abandoned, and soon after the design bureau was closed down.

== Specifications ==
Data from

General characteristics

- Crew: 3
- Length: 9.76 m (32 ft 0 in)
- Empty weight: 3,398 kg (7,491 lb)
- Max takeoff weight: 4,510 kg (9,943 lb)
- Powerplant: 2 × Ivchenko AI-26G(F) radial piston engine
- Main rotor diameter: 2 × 10.00 m (32 ft 10 in)
- Main rotor area: 74.71 m^{2} (804.2 sq ft)

Performance

- Maximum speed: 155 km/h (96 mph, 84 kn) at 1500m (4920ft)
- Range: 328 km (204 mi, 177 nmi)
- Service ceiling: 2,550 m (8,370 ft)

== See also ==
Related development

- Bratukhin B-5
- Bratukhin B-10

Related lists

- List of rotorcraft
