= PZL-106 Kruk =

Polish agricultural aircraft

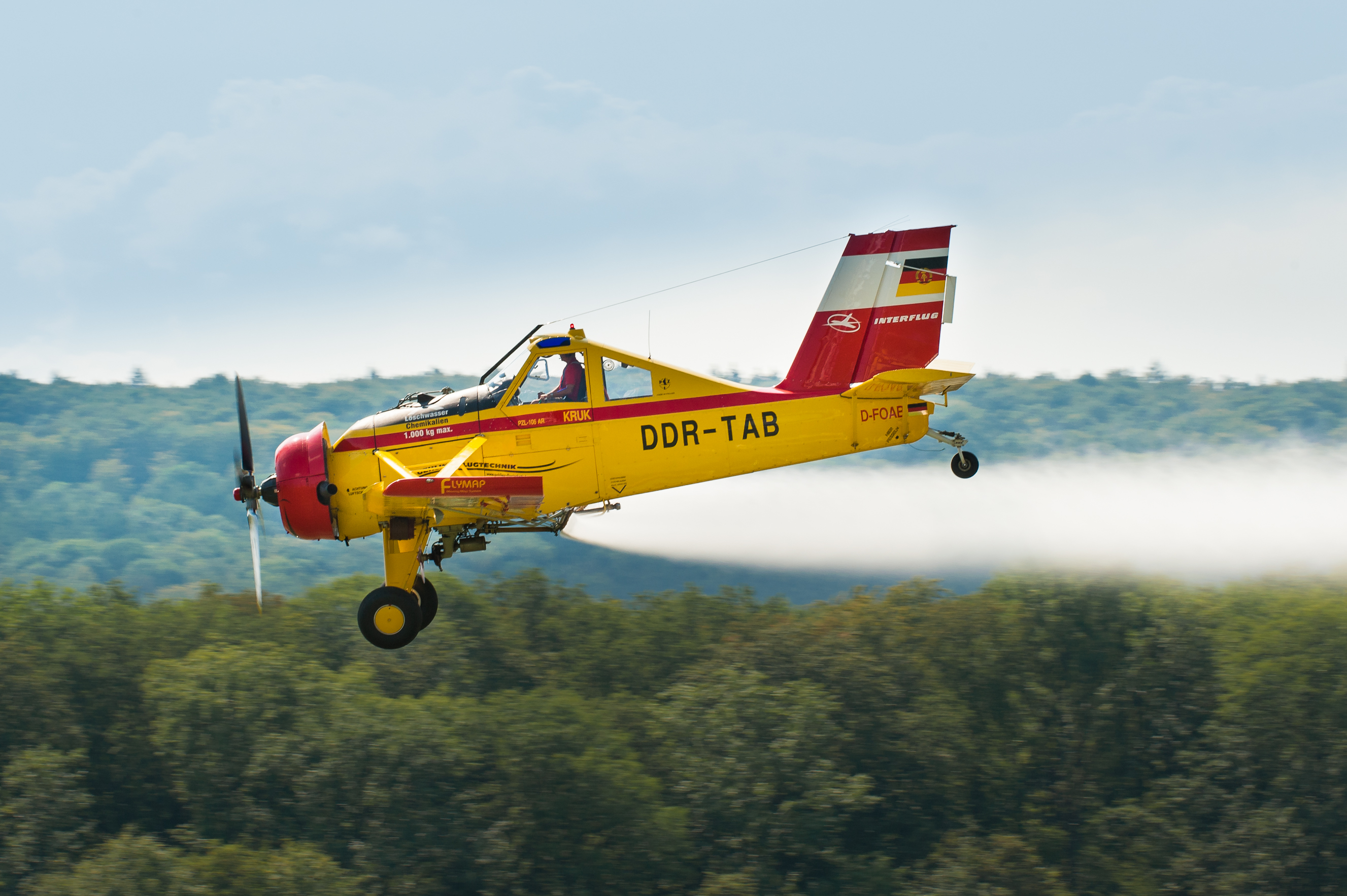
- PZL-106A at the oldtimer aircraft meeting, 2013, Hahnweide, Germany

General information
- Type: Agricultural aircraft
- National origin: Poland
- Manufacturer: WSK PZL Warszawa-Okęcie
- Status: in production
- Primary users: Polish civilian aviation East Germany; Argentina
- Number built: 275+

History
- Manufactured: 1976–
- First flight: April 17, 1973

The PZL-106 Kruk (English: Raven) is a Polish agricultural aircraft designed and built by WSK PZL Warszawa-Okęcie (later PZL "Warszawa-Okęcie" and now EADS-PZL).

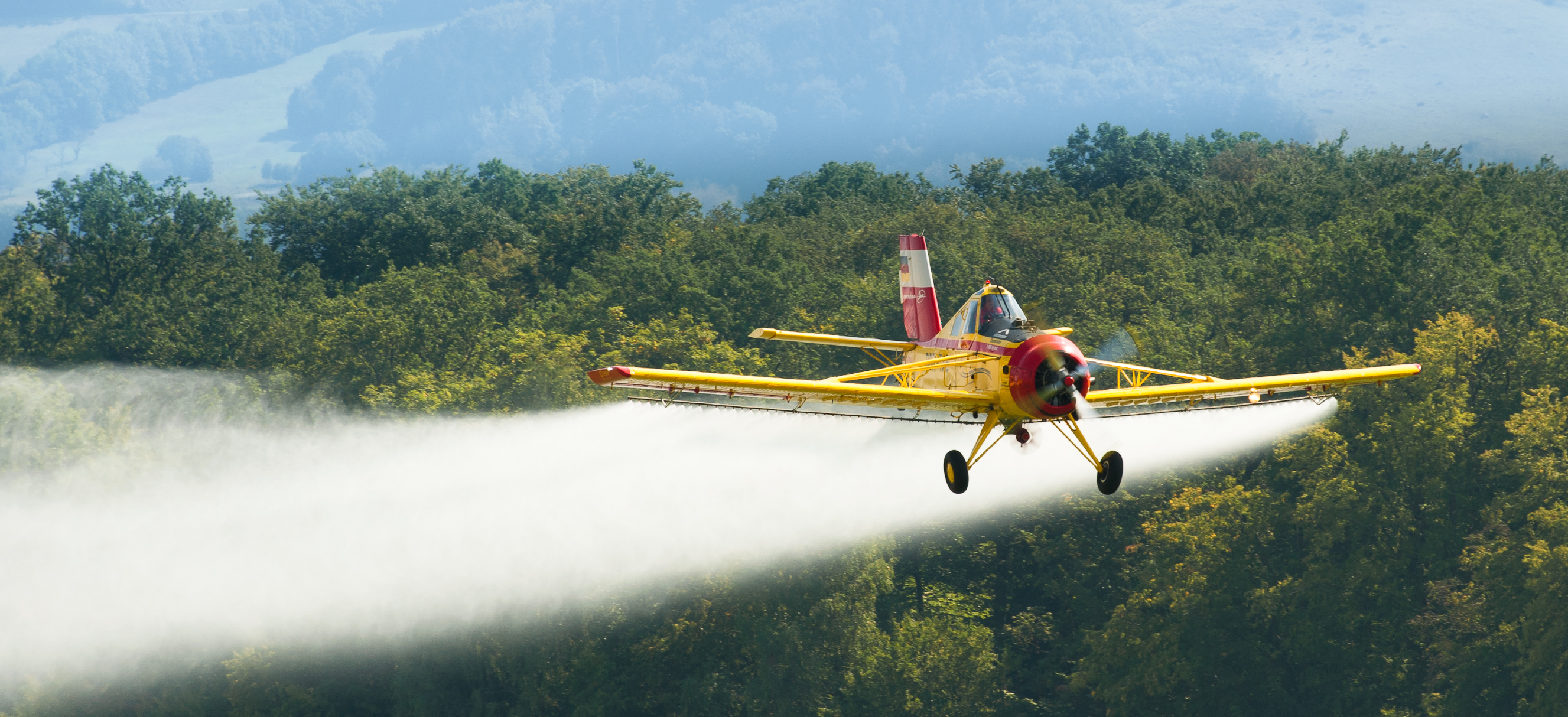
PZL-106A at the oldtimer aircraft meeting, 2013, airfield Hahnweide, Germany, at a spray flight.

== Design and development ==
The PZL-106 was developed as a modern agricultural aircraft for Poland and Comecon countries to replace the less-capable PZL-101 Gawron and aging PZL Antonov An-2. (According to Comecon decisions, Polish industry was responsible for developing agricultural aircraft). There were several agricultural plane designs proposed in the early 1960s by a group of young designers from WSK PZL Warszawa-Okęcie, led by Andrzej Frydrychewicz. These proposals were made on their own initiative, but they were never realized because the USSR was content with the An-2 and was planning to replace it with a jet aircraft (later PZL M-15 Belphegor). The first was the PZL-101M Kruk 63 of 1963. That remained a paper airplane, but it did give its name to later designs. Next were the PZL-106 Kruk 65 (1965), PZL-110 Kruk-2T (1969), and PZL M-14 Kruk (1970, which was planned to produce this variant in PZL-Mielec). Only in 1971 did the authorities decide to start development of new agricultural design such as the PZL-106 Kruk 71. Despite this decision, its development was quite protracted due to economic and political factors. The work, led by Andrzej Frydrychewicz, started in 1972 and was based on earlier designs. The first prototype was flown on April 17, 1973. The designers chose a safe layout of a braced low-wing monoplane with a container for chemicals in front of the pilot, a design inspired by planes like Piper PA-25 Pawnee (in case of an emergency landing, the container would not crush the higher-sitting pilot).

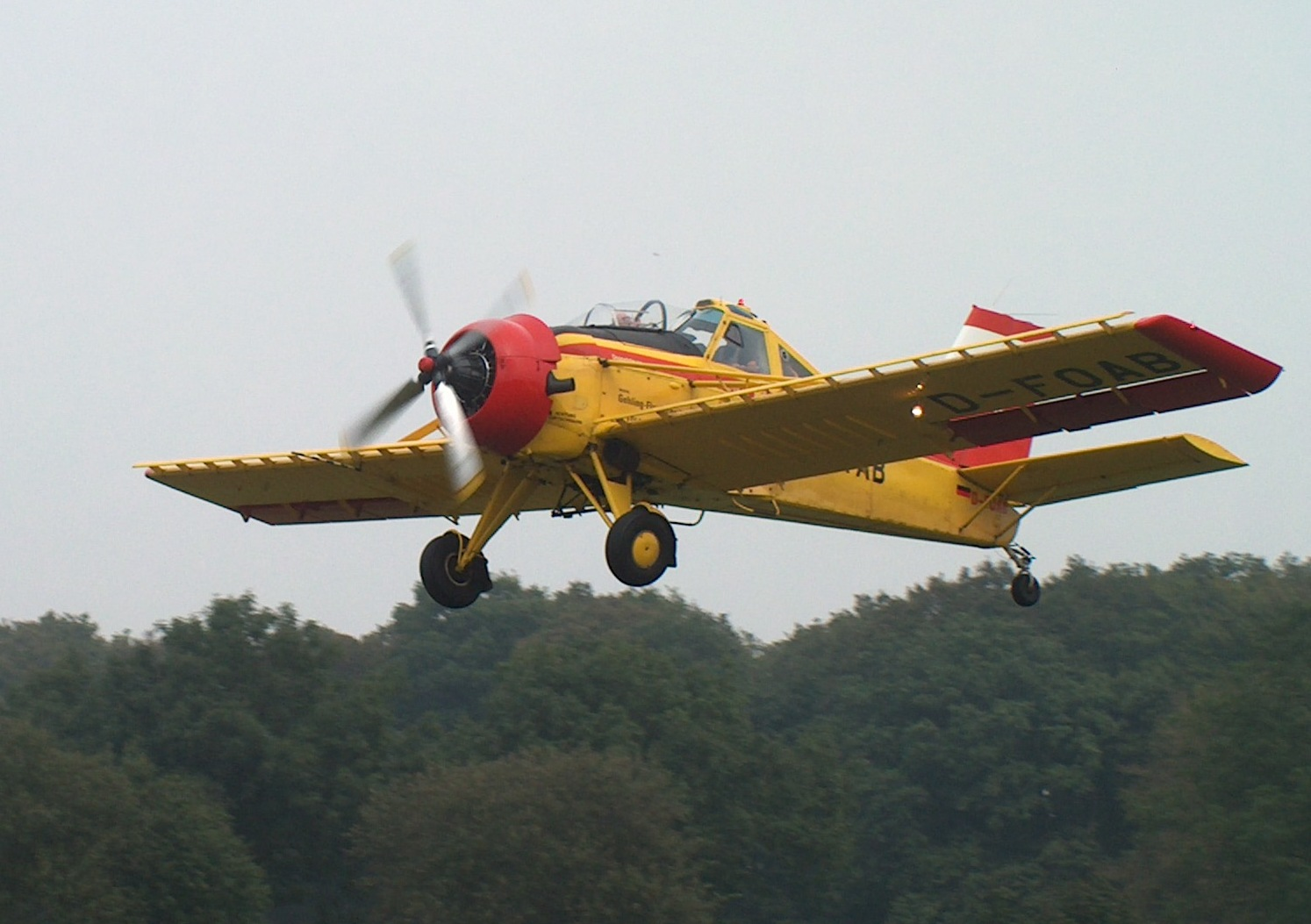
PZL-106A in flight

The first prototype was powered by an imported 298 kW (400 hp) Lycoming IO-720 flat-eight-cylinder engine and had a T-tail with wings of wooden construction. There were several prototypes built, and the plane was finally fitted with a 441 kW (600 hp) PZL-3S radial engine, a conventional tail and metal wings. The prototype with the final engine first flew on 25 October, 1974.

Production started in 1976 under the designation PZL-106A. Successive variants were the PZL-106AR, with PZL-3SR engine, and the PZL-106AS, with a stronger 736 kW ASz-62IR radial engine. By 1982, 144 PZL-106As had been built. Several aircraft were modified in Africa to PZL-106AS standards.

On May 15, 1981, the prototype of an improved variant PZL-106B was flown with redesigned wings using shorter struts. It was powered by the same PZL-3SR engine and was produced from 1984. In 1982, the prototype of the PZL-106BS flew powered by the ASz-62IR engine. By 1988, 60 PZL-106Bs had been built.

The next step was fitting the Kruk with a turboprop engine. The first was the PZL-106AT Turbo Kruk prototype, with a 566 kW (770 hp) Pratt & Whitney PT6A-34AG engine, in 1981. The next version, based upon the PZL-106B, was the PZL-106BT Turbo Kruk with a 544 kW Walter M601D-1 engine. The PZL-106BT first flew in 1985 and was only produced in limited numbers (10 in 1986–1988). The last variant, in 1998, was the PZL-106BTU-34 Turbo Kruk, with a Pratt & Whitney PT6A-34AG engine. Both turboprop variants have a taller tailfin, and the BTU-34 differs again with a restyled nose, a bigger fuel tank (780 L), a revised cockpit layout, and improved performance.

In total, 266 PZL-106s were produced. Production was restarted in 1995, and, as of 2007, the PZL-106BT (renamed PZL-106BT-601) with the Walter M601-D1, and the PZL-106BTU-34, with the PT6A-34AG engine, are currently being offered by the manufacturer EADS-PZL. Limited numbers of turbo-Kruks have been produced so far.

== Description ==
The PZL-106 is a metal construction braced low-wing monoplane that is conventional in layout. The fuselage is a steel frame covered with duralumin front and canvas tail. Wings are duralumin and canvas covered, fitted with flaps and slats. It has a single-seat cabin, placed high, with an emergency seat for a mechanic behind the pilot. Behind the engine is a 1300-litre container for 1050 kg of chemicals, with interchangeable equipment sets for spraying, cropdusting or fire-fighting. The container might be replaced with an additional cab for an instructor for pilot training. It has conventional fixed landing gear with a tail wheel.

The PZL-106 has a single radial engine PZL-3S or SR (600 hp / 441 kW), four-blade propeller or turboprop engine with three-blade propeller (554 kW Walter M601D-1 or PT6A-34AG). Fuel tanks for 540 L, or from serial number 260 onwards, 760 L.

== Operational history ==
The main user of the PZL-106 was the Polish civilian aviation. At that time, Polish state aviation firms often carried out agricultural services abroad, especially in Egypt and Sudan. They were supplemented and partly superseded by the PZL-Mielec M-18 Dromader. PZL-106As and Bs were exported to East Germany (major non-Polish user – 54), Czechoslovakia, Egypt, Hungary, Argentina, Brazil, and Ecuador. Some PZL-106BT-601s were sold to Egypt, Ecuador (2 Operational till 2008), Argentina (30 operational till 2008), and Brazil (4 operational till 2008). The PZL 106BT-34 is still flying in Argentina.

== Variants ==
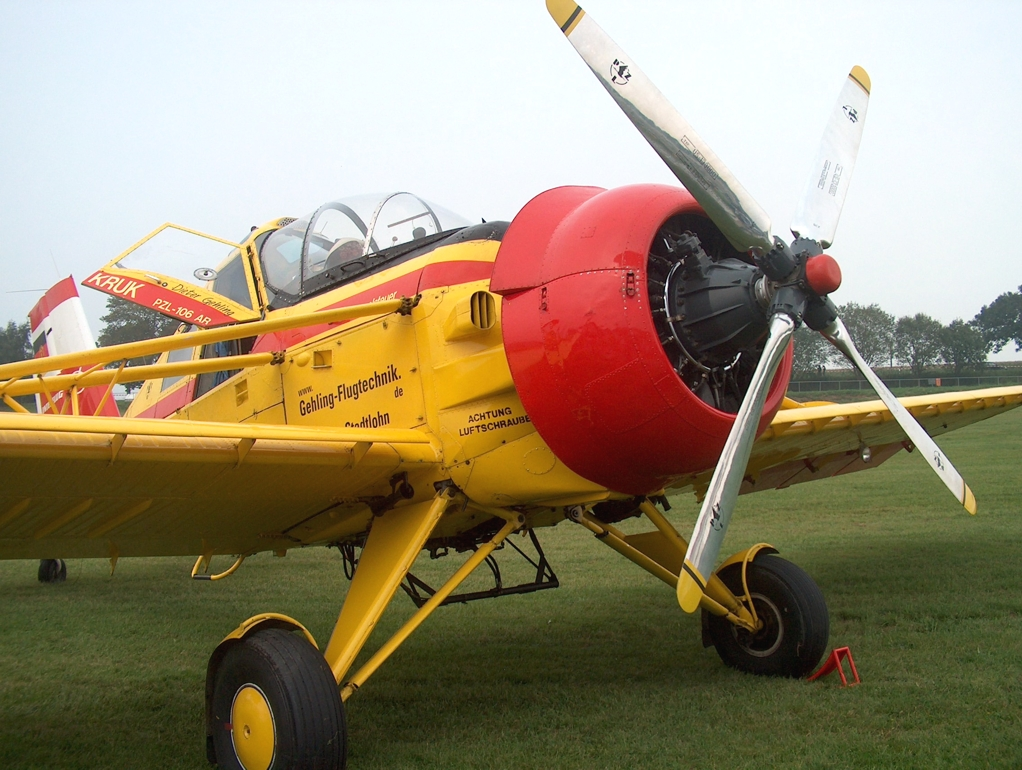
PZL-106A with an additional cab in front

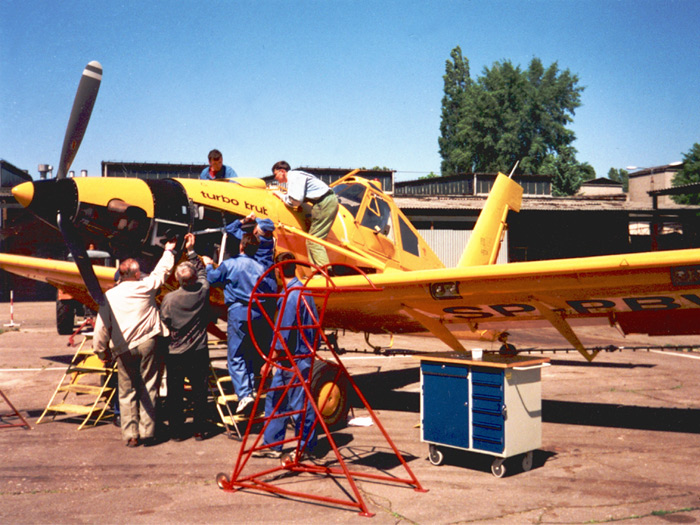
PZL-106BT Turbo Kruk

PZL-106
Prototypes, first flew on 17 April 1973.
PZL-106A
Basic production variant with 441 kW (591 hp) PZL-3S radial engine, produced 1976–1982
PZL-106AR
Prototype with PZL-3SR engine with a reduction gear, first flew on 15 November 1978
PZL-106AT Turbo Kruk
Prototype with Pratt & Whitney Canada PT6A-34AG turboprop engine, first flew on 22 June 1981
PZL-106AS
Variant with 736 kW (987 hp) PZL ASz-62IR engine, first flew on 19 August 1981
PZL-106B
Improved production variant with redesigned wings and shorter struts, PZL-3SR engine, first flew on 15 May 1981, produced in 1984–1988
PZL-106BS
Prototype with PZL ASz-62IR engine, first flew on 8 March 1982
PZL-106BT-601 Turbo Kruk
Production variant with 544 kW (730 hp) Walter M601D-1 turboprop engine, first flew on 18 September 1985
PZL-106BTU-34 Turbo Kruk
Production variant with 560 kW (750 shp) Pratt & Whitney Canada PT6A-34AG turboprop engine, first flew in 1998. Still flying in Argentina

== Operators ==
- Australia With 1 PZL 106BT-601s
- Argentina With 30 PZL 106-BT-601 Turbo Kruks and one PZL 106BT-34
- Brazil With 4 PZL 106BT-601s
- Ecuador With 2 PZL 106BT-601s
- Czechoslovakia
- East Germany received 54 aircraft
- Egypt
- Hungary With 2 PZL 106As, entered service in 1977
- Venezuela One PZL 106 in service with the Venezuelan National Guard.

== Specifications (PZL-106BR) ==
Data from Jane's All The World's Aircraft 1988–89

General characteristics

- Crew: 1, pilot
- Capacity: 1 seat for mechanic (optional) / 1,300 kg (2,900 lb) / 1,400 L (370 US gal; 310 imp gal) hopper for chemicals
- Length: 9.25 m (30 ft 4 in)
- Wingspan: 14.9 m (48 ft 11 in)
- Height: 3.32 m (10 ft 11 in)
- Wing area: 31.69 m^{2} (341.1 sq ft)
- Airfoil: NACA 2415
- Empty weight: 1,790 kg (3,946 lb)
- Max takeoff weight: 3,000 kg (6,614 lb) and max landing weight

3,450 kg (7,610 lb) (restricted category)

- Fuel capacity: 560 L (150 US gal; 120 imp gal) in two integral wing tanks with an optional 390 L (100 US gal; 86 imp gal) auxiliary tank in the hopper compartment
- Powerplant: 1 × PZL-3SR 7-cylinder air-cooled geared and supercharged radial piston engine, 450 kW (600 hp)
- Propellers: 4-bladed PZL US-133000 constant-speed propeller

Performance

- Maximum speed: 215 km/h (134 mph, 116 kn) at sea level
- Operating speed: 150–160 km/h (93–99 mph; 81–86 kn) with max chemical load
- Stall speed: 100 km/h (62 mph, 54 kn)
- Never exceed speed: 245 km/h (152 mph, 132 kn)
- Range: 900 km (560 mi, 490 nmi) with max standard fuel
- Rate of climb: 3.8 m/s (750 ft/min)
- Wing loading: 108.86 kg/m^{2} (22.30 lb/sq ft) (restricted category)
- Power/mass: 0.0777 hp/lb (0.1277 kW/kg) (restricted category)
- Take-off run: 250 m (820 ft) (with agricultural equipment)
- Landing run: 200 m (660 ft) (with agricultural equipment)

== See also ==
Aircraft of comparable role, configuration, and era

- Aero Boero 260AG
- Air Tractor AT-502
- Ayres Thrush
- Cessna 188
- Piper PA-25 Pawnee
- Piper PA-36 Pawnee Brave
- PZL-Mielec M-18 Dromader
- Zlín Z-37 Čmelák / LET Z-137T Agro Turbo
