= Ivchenko AI-26 =

AI-26
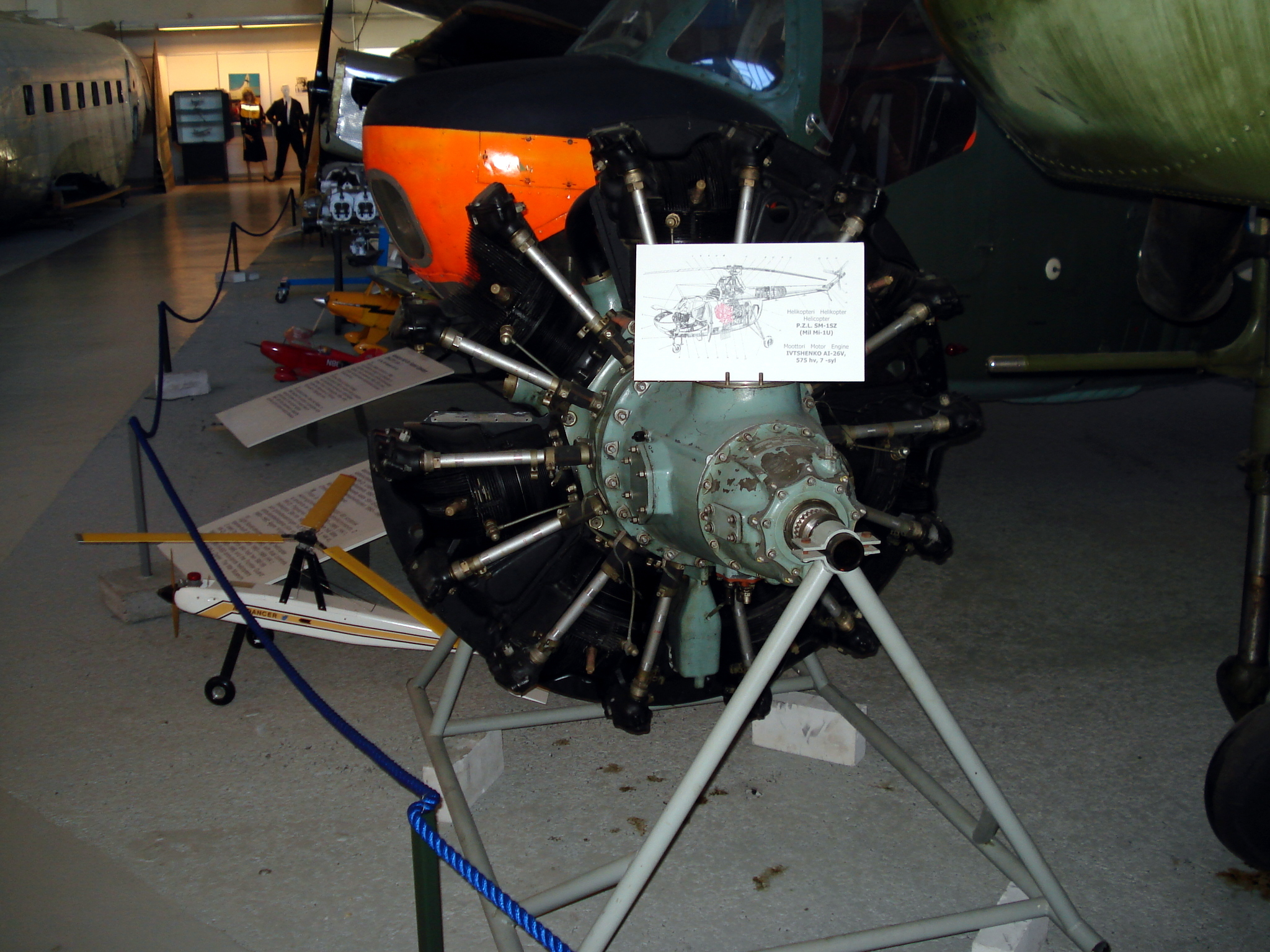
- Polish-made AI-26V (LIT-3) used to power SM-1 (Mi-1) helicopter, displayed in Finnish Aviation Museum
- Type: Radial engine
- National origin: Soviet Union
- Manufacturer: Ivchenko
- First run: 1945
- Major applications: Mil Mi-1

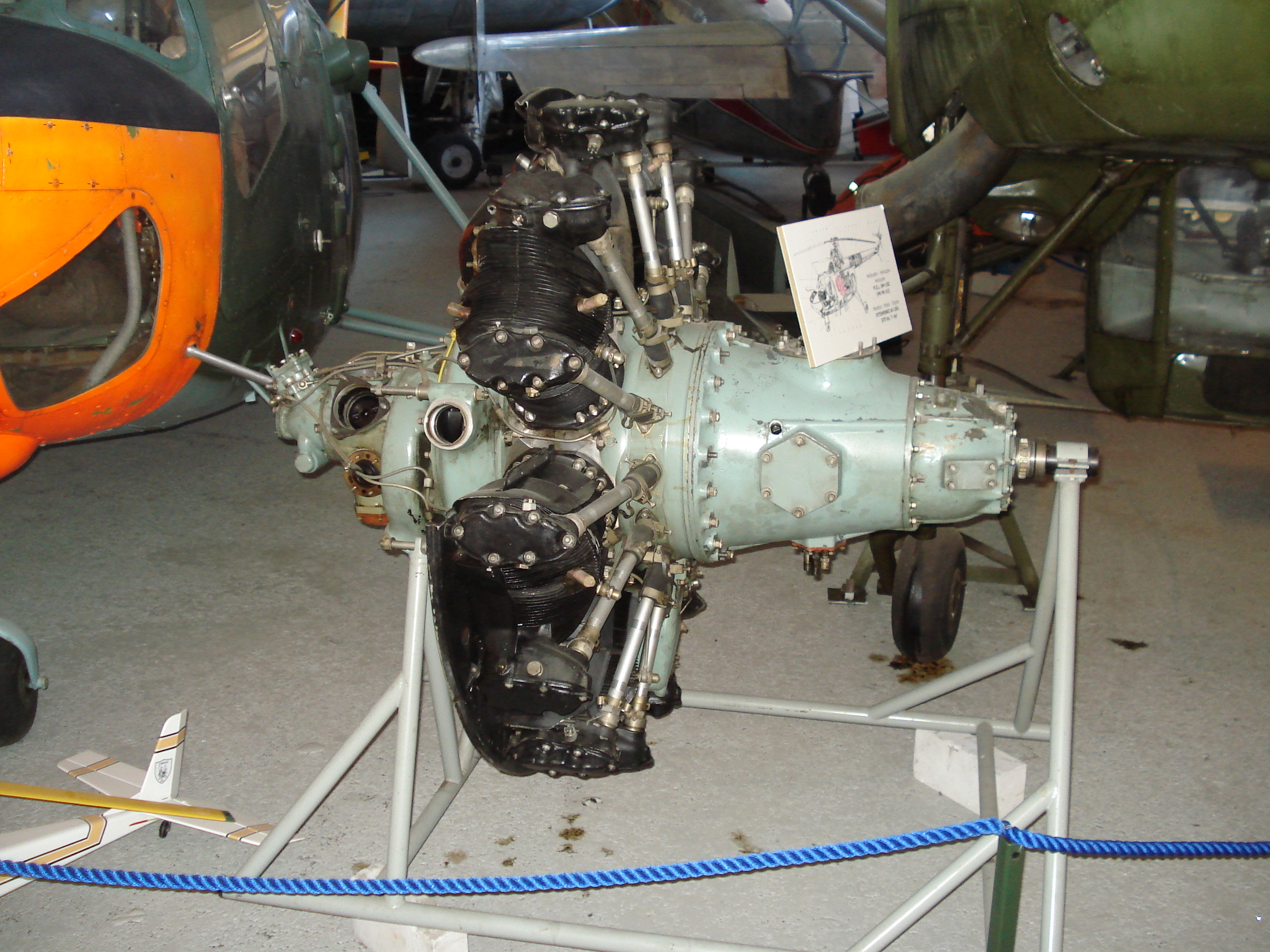

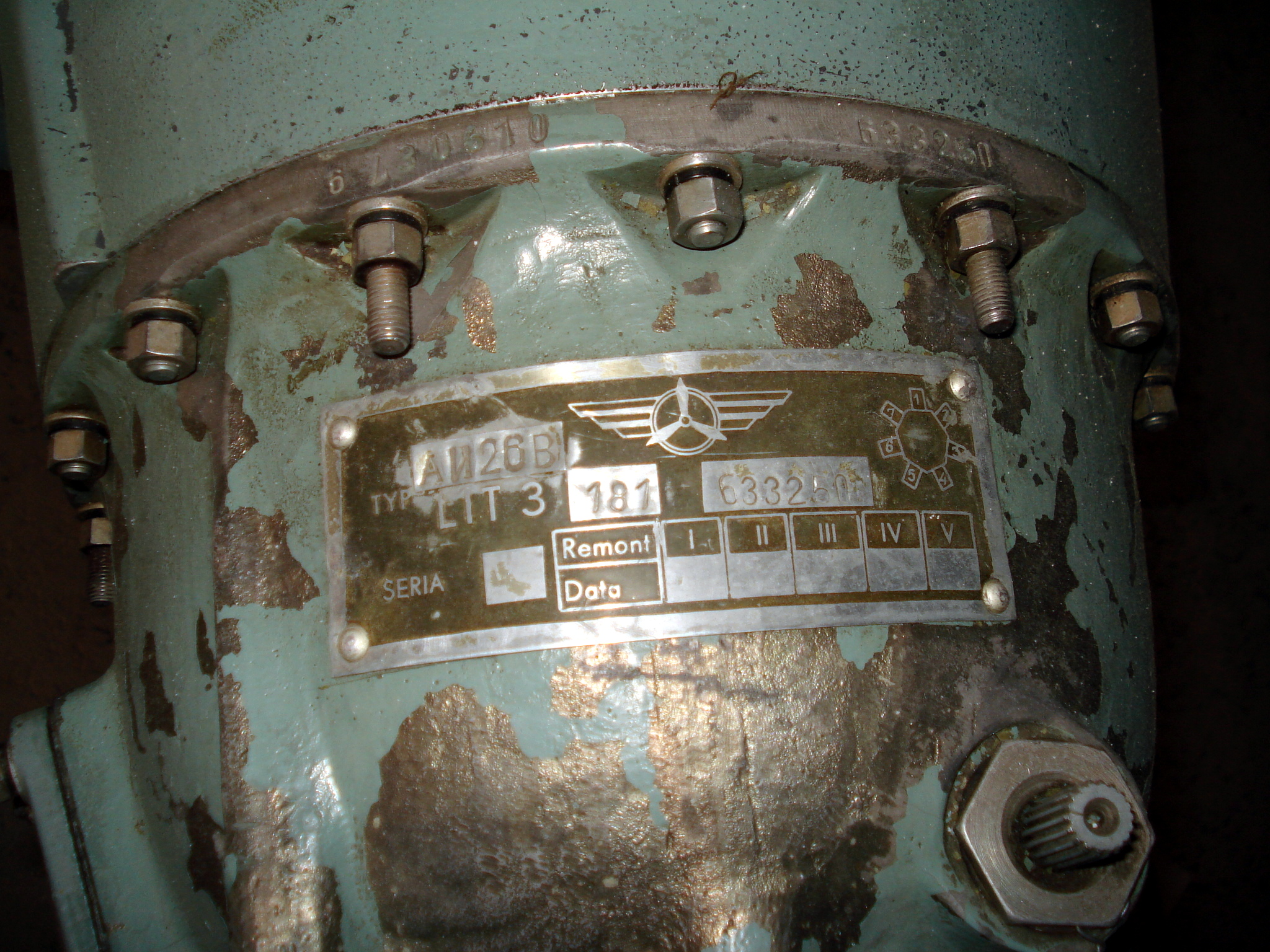
Detail of plaque on Polish-made AI-26V (LIT-3) used to power SM-1 (Mi-1 helicopter), displayed in Finnish Aviation Museum

The Ivchenko AI-26 (Russian: Ивченко АИ-26) is a seven-cylinder air-cooled radial engine used in early Soviet helicopters and later used in light utility aircraft.

== Design and development ==
The AI-26 engine was designed by A.G Ivchenko in 1945 with the early designation M-26, later the designation was changed to AI-26. Like the Shvetsov ASh-21 which is basically one bank of cylinders from the Shvetsov ASh-82, the AI-26 was also influenced by the ASh-82. The AI-26 retained the bore, stroke and displacement of the ASh-21 while incorporating new features peculiar to its role. This similarity allowed the AI-26 to use the same production jigs as the ASh-21 and ASh-82 which reduced costs and simplified production.

The engine was envisioned as a helicopter engine, but the early test models lacked the necessary equipment to facilitate this role, such as an auxiliary cooling fan, reduction gears and clutch. The GR suffix means "Gelikopter", or helicopter. Engine testing was completed by early 1946 and by 1947 helicopter testing had begun. In late 1947 the decision to mass-produce the engine was made and production commenced at factory No.478 located in Zaporizhia. Between 1947 and the 1970s some 1,300 AI-26GR's were produced. The AI-26V model was also produced in Poland during the 1960s as the LiT-3 and later as the PZL-3S.

== Applications ==
- Air Tractor AT-401A
- Ayres Thrush
- Bratukhin B-5
- Bratukhin B-11
- Mil Mi-1
- PZL-106 Kruk
- PZL SM-2
- Yakovlev Yak-100

== Specifications (Ivchenko AI-26GR) ==
=== General characteristics ===
- Type: 7 cylinder air-cooled radial engine
- Bore: 155.5 mm (6.12 in)
- Stroke: 155 mm (6.10 in)
- Displacement: 20.6 L (1,257 cu in)
- Dry weight: 395 kg (871 lb)

=== Components ===
- Cooling system: Air-cooled

=== Performance ===
- Power output: 500 hp

== See also ==
- List of aircraft engines
