= Bennett Airtruck =

New Zealand agricultural aircraft

Airtruck
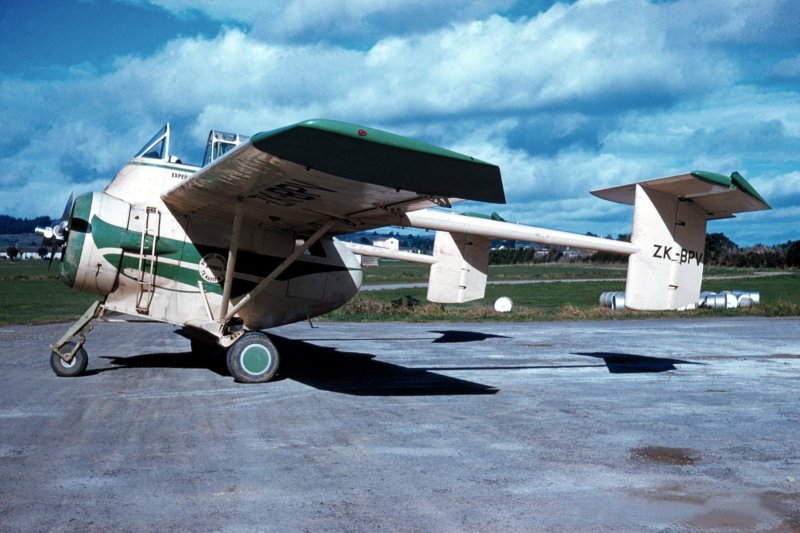
- The Airtruck prototype

General information
- Type: Agricultural aircraft
- National origin: New Zealand
- Manufacturer: Bennett Aviation / Waitamo Aircraft
- Designer: Luigi Pellarini
- Number built: 2

History
- First flight: 2 August 1960
- Developed from: Kingsford Smith PL.7
- Developed into: Transavia PL-12 Airtruk

The PL-11 Airtruck is a New Zealand agricultural aircraft.

A strikingly unusual aircraft, the PL-11 Airtruck was developed from the Kingsford Smith PL.7 as a replacement for the de Havilland Tiger Moth in the New Zealand aerial topdressing market by Luigi Pellarini for Waitomo Aircraft. The prototype was constructed using bits of war surplus ex-RNZAF North American Harvards. It featured all aluminium structure, a high-wing monoplane with a steel stub wing and V lift struts, steerable tricycle undercarriage, an extremely stubby pod fuselage, the cockpit (made from shortened Harvard glazing) being mounted directly over the radial engine, providing excellent forward view and very high drag, beneath it was room for a superphosphate hopper or up to 5 people in a cabin. The strangeness was completed by twin booms each supporting unconnected tail units, (the idea being a truck could reverse between the tail units to load the hopper). Despite the outlandish appearance, the Airtruck was surprisingly successful, if unable to compete with the Fletcher Fu24 in its design market.

The first Bennett Airtruck, ZK-BPV, took to the air on 2 August 1960, and crashed during trials in October 1963. Following company reorganization the second example, known as the Waitomo PL-11 Airtruck and registered ZK-CKE, flew in March 1965. It commenced commercial operations late in February 1967 but crashed a few days later. An unconfirmed report indicates that a third airframe was largely constructed but never flew.

A shortage of Harvard parts led to the type being redesigned for all-new construction by the Transavia Corporation, as the Transavia PL-12 Airtruk, 118 of which were produced in Australia between 1965 and 1985.

== Specifications (Waitomo Airtruck) ==
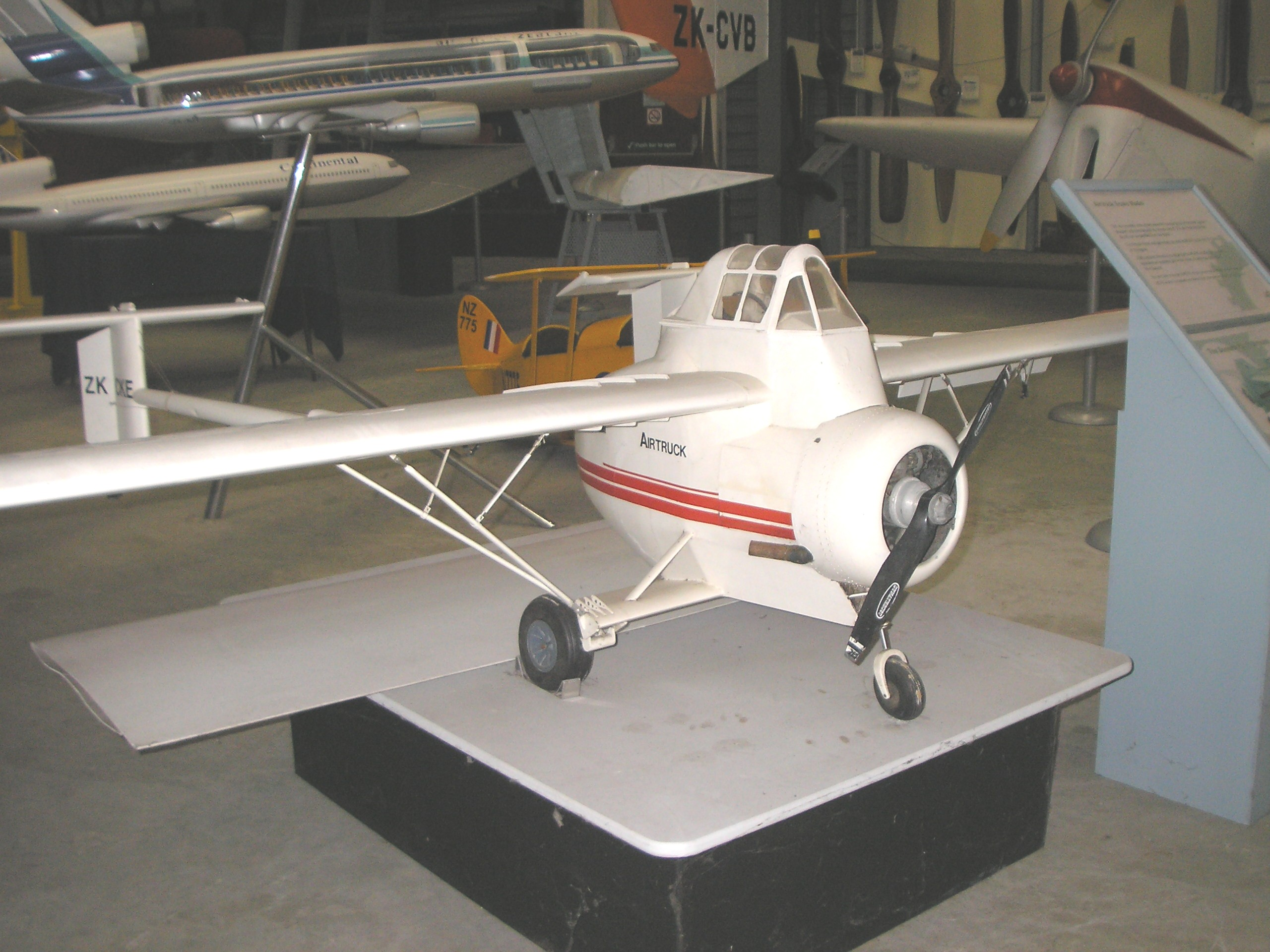
A model of the Airtruck at MOTAT.

Data from Jane's All The World's Aircraft 1965-66

General characteristics

- Crew: 1 pilot, seats for two loaders
- Length: 25 ft 8 in (7.82 m)
- Wingspan: 48 ft 0 in (14.63 m)
- Height: 10 ft 10 in (3.30 m)
- Wing area: 369 sq ft (34.3 m^{2})
- Airfoil: NACA 23012
- Empty weight: 3,700 lb (1,678 kg)
- Max takeoff weight: 7,200 lb (3,266 kg)
- Fuel capacity: 84 Imp Gallons (382 L)
- Powerplant: 1 × Pratt & Whitney R-1340 nine-cylinder air-cooled radial engine, 550 hp (410 kW)

Performance

- Maximum speed: 164 mph (264 km/h, 143 kn)
- Cruise speed: 124 mph (200 km/h, 108 kn) (econ cruise)
- Stall speed: 43 mph (69 km/h, 37 kn) (flaps down, hopper empty)
- Range: 450 mi (720 km, 390 nmi) (with max fuel)
- Rate of climb: 1,800 ft/min (9.1 m/s) (hopper empty)
