= Kingsford Smith PL.7 =

PL.7

General information
- Type: Agricultural aircraft
- National origin: Australia
- Manufacturer: Kingsford Smith Aviation Service
- Designer: Luigi Pellarini

History
- First flight: 21 September 1956
- Developed into: PL-11 Airtruck

The Kingsford Smith PL.7 was an Australian agricultural aircraft designed by Luigi Pellarini and built in the 1950s by Kingsford Smith Aviation Service.

== Design and development ==
The PL.7 was basically a welded steel tank for the pilot and chemical hopper, on the front was mounted a 400 hp (298 kW) Armstrong Siddeley Cheetah X radial engine. It was an unequal span biplane with a tail unit supported by twin booms from the upper wings and a fixed tricycle landing gear.

== Specifications ==
Data from Flight

General characteristics

- Crew: 1
- Length: 24 ft 6 in (7.47 m)
- Wingspan: 40 ft 10 in (12.2 m)
- Height: 12 ft 0 in (3.66 m)
- Wing area: 405 sq ft (37.6 m^{2})
- Gross weight: 5,000 lb (2,268 kg)
- Powerplant: 1 × Armstrong Siddeley Cheetah X radial piston engine , 400 hp (298 kW)

Performance

- Cruise speed: 112 mph (180 km/h, 97 kn)
