= Transavia PL-12 Airtruk =

1966 agricultural aircraft family by Transavia

PL-12 Airtruk
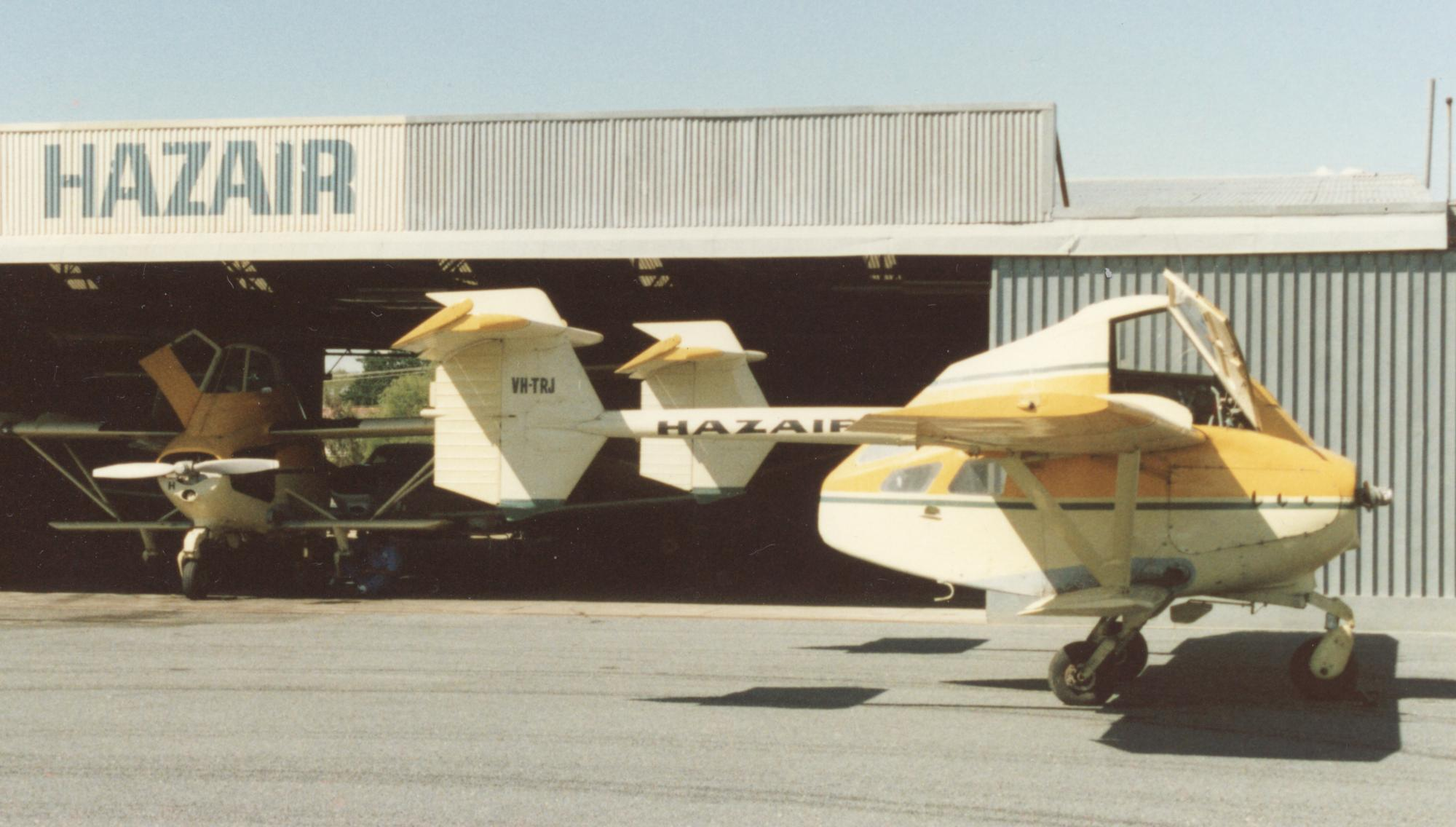
- Hazair PL-12 Airtruks at Albury Airport in March 1988

General information
- Type: Agricultural aircraft
- National origin: Australia
- Manufacturer: Transavia Corporation
- Designer: Luigi Pellarini
- Number built: 138

History
- Manufactured: 1966-1993
- First flight: 22 April 1965
- Developed from: PL-11 Airtruck

The Transavia PL-12 Airtruk is a single-engine agricultural aircraft designed and built by the Transavia Corporation in Australia. The Airtruk is a shoulder-wing strut braced sesquiplane of all-metal construction, with the cockpit mounted above a tractor-location opposed-cylinder air-cooled engine and short pod fuselage with rear door. The engine cowling, rear fuselage and top decking are of fibreglass. It has a tricycle undercarriage, the main units of which are carried on the lower sesquiplane wings. It has twin tail booms with two unconnected tails. Its first flight was on 22 April 1965, and was certified on 10 February 1966.

A Transavia PL-12 featured in the 1985 movie Mad Max Beyond Thunderdome.

== Design and development ==
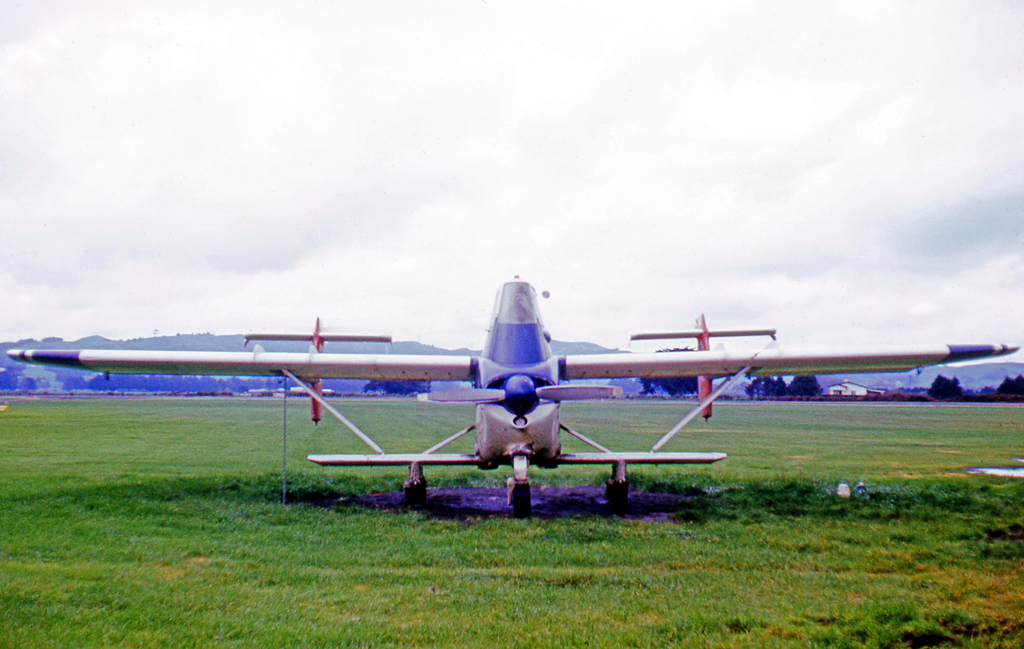
Head on view showing the PL12s deep fuselage and twin fins on trailing booms

It was developed from the Bennett Airtruck designed in New Zealand by Luigi Pellarini. It has a 1 tonne capacity hopper and is able to ferry two passengers as a topdresser. Other versions can be used as cargo, ambulance or aerial survey aircraft, and carry one passenger in the top deck and four in the lower deck.

The Airtruk is also sometimes known as the Airtruck. Because the name "Airtruck" was registered by the New Zealand companies Bennett Aviation and Waitomo Aircraft, for their PL-11, Transavia found another name for its PL-12 ("Airtruk").

July 1978 saw the first flight of an improved model, the T-300 Skyfarmer, which was powered by a Textron Lycoming IO-540-engine. This was followed in 1981 by the T-300A with improved aerodynamics. Transavia ceased production of the T-300 in 1985.

In 1982, certification was undertaken to enable sales in the North American market. Assistance was provided by the Aeronautical Research Laboratories of the Defence Science and Technology Organisation (DSTO) and extensive tests carried out on the ground and in subsequent flight flutter clearance trials.

In 1985, an extended version was produced and released as the T-400. The engine was changed from a 6-cylinder to an 8-cylinder and the tail booms extended by 750 millimetres (30 in). Other minor changes were made to the aerodynamics. Flutter clearance tests were again carried out by ARL and manufacture proceeded.

An isolated flutter incident was reported in 1986 involving violent oscillations of the rudder and tail boom on the T-400 during a delivery flight. Investigations were carried out by ARL, and a split mass balance arm was fitted to each rudder. Prior to this, the aircraft had relied on frictional damping provided by the lengthy control cables. The modified aircraft was tested both on the ground and in flight trials in March 1988 over Port Philip, near Melbourne, Australia. All attempts to induce the oscillations showed that there was no indication of a mode of vibration becoming unstable. The maximum speed achieved was 160 knots (180 mph; 300 km/h) in a steep dive. Oscillations were induced with an air operated tool fitted with an out-of-balance rotating mass. This device had a rotational speed from 18 Hz down to zero for each charge of the compressed air cylinder.

At least 120 had been built by 1988.

== Operations and survivors ==
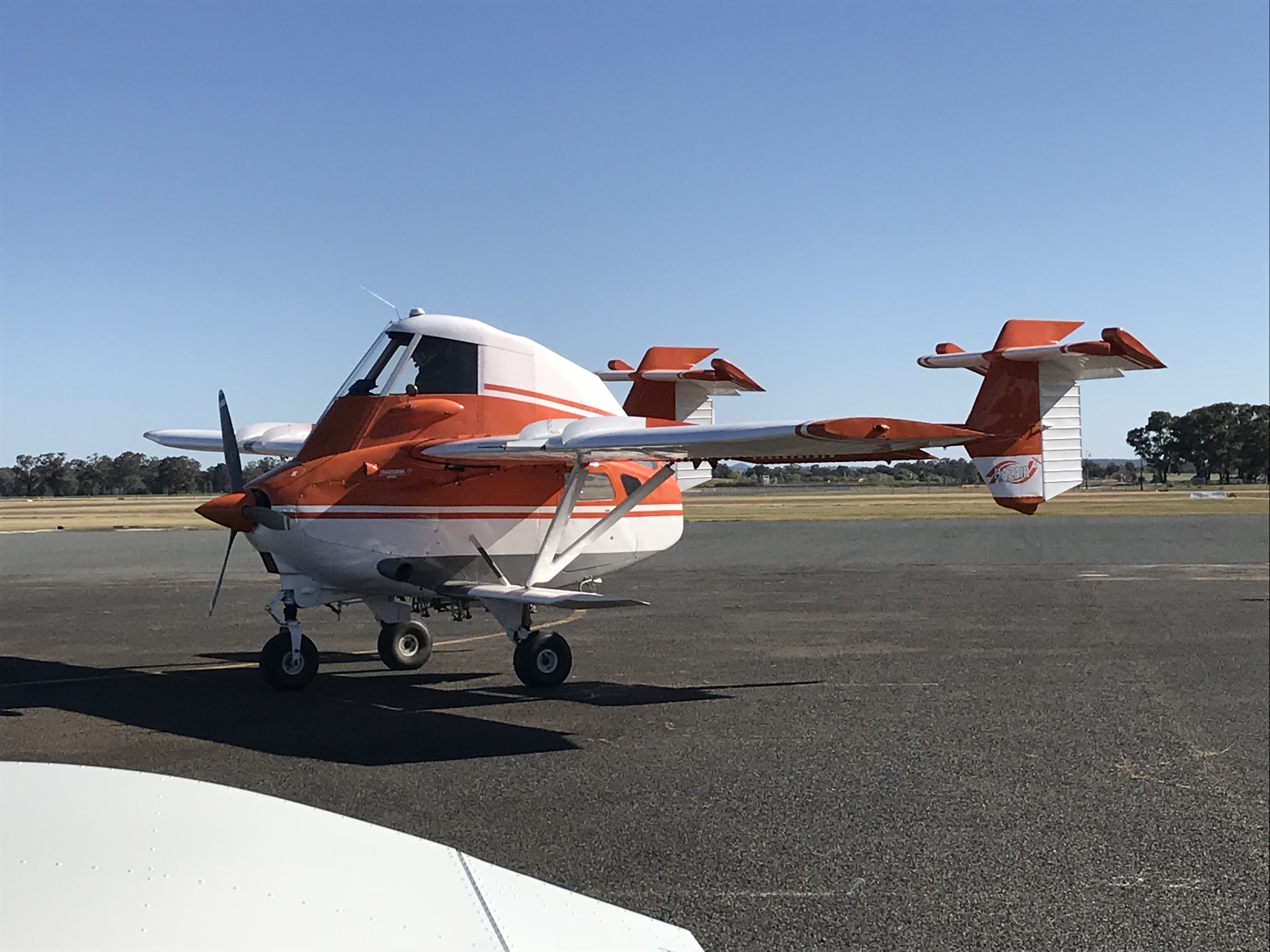
Airtruk at Temora Airport, NSW, Australia (2018)

Australia

- The second prototype is preserved at the Powerhouse Museum in Sydney.
- Two PL-12s, including one assembled from parts of two aircraft, are on display at the Queensland Air Museum, Caloundra Airport.

Denmark

- A PL-12 is on display and under restoration at the Danmarks Flymuseum at Stauning Vestjylland Airport in western Jutland.

New Zealand

Airworthy PL-12 Airtruk ZK-DMZ at Warbirds Over Wanaka, 2026

- A PL-12 is on display at the Museum of Transport & Technology, Auckland, New Zealand

Spain

- A PL-12 is located at the Museum of Aeronautics and Astronautics, Madrid–Cuatro Vientos Airport.

Indonesia

- A PL-12 is placed at the entrance to a golf course (Padang golf Halim) in Halim Perdana Kusuma.

== Variants ==
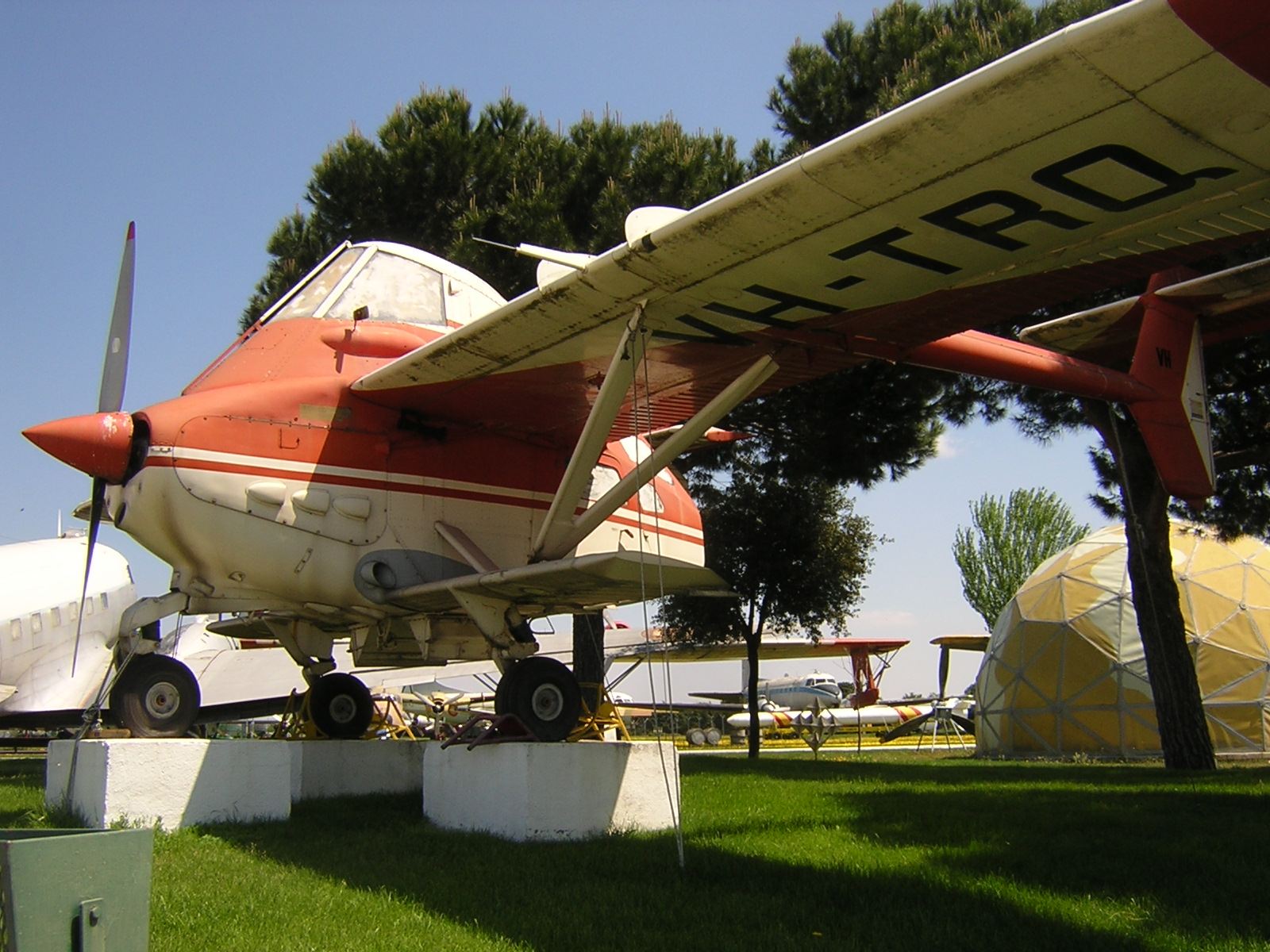
Transavia PL-12-300 Airtruk preserved at the Museo del Aire at Cuatro Vientos airfield near Madrid

PL-12 Airtruk
Single-engined agricultural aircraft. Powered by 300 hp (224 kW) Rolls-Royce Continental IO-520-D
PL-12U
Multi-purpose utility transport, air ambulance, aerial survey aircraft.
T-320 Airtruk
Powered by a 320-hp Continental/Rolls-Royce Tiara 6-320-2B piston engine.
Skyfarmer T-300
Powered by Lycoming O-540 engine.
Skyfarmer T-300A
Improved version of the T-300.
Skyfarmer T-400
Enlarged, more powerful (400 hp (298 kW) Lycoming O-720 engine.
PL-12 MIL
Proposed multi-role utility transport, air ambulance, forward air control, light attack, counter-insurgency aircraft. Also known as the M-300.
PL-12 550T
Proposed variant powered by a 550 hp (410 kW) Pratt & Whitney Canada PT6A turboprop engine.

== Specifications (PL-12) ==
Data from Jane's All the Worlds Aircraft 1988-89

General characteristics

- Crew: 1
- Capacity: 2 passengers / 2,000 lb (910 kg) dry chemicals or 818 L (216 US gal; 180 imp gal) liquids
- Length: 21 ft 0 in (6.4 m)
- Wingspan: 39 ft 4 in (11.98 m)
- Height: 9 ft 0 in (2.74 m)
- Wing area: 256 sq ft (23.8 m^{2})
- Airfoil: NACA 23012
- Empty weight: 1,709 lb (775 kg)
- Max takeoff weight: 4,090 lb (1,855 kg) (agricultural mission)
- Fuel capacity: 181.5 L (47.9 US gal; 39.9 imp gal) in two upper wing fuel tanks with optional second tank in each wing for a total of 373 L (99 US gal; 82 imp gal)
- Powerplant: 1 × Rolls-Royce/Continental IO-520-D 6-cylinder air-cooled horizontally opposed piston engine, 300 hp (220 kW)
- Propellers: 2-bladed McCauley constant speed metal propeller, 7 ft 4 in (2.23 m) diameter

Performance

- Maximum speed: 103 kn (119 mph, 191 km/h)
- Cruise speed: 95 kn (109 mph, 176 km/h) at 75% power at sea level ISA
- Stall speed: 52 kn (60 mph, 96 km/h) flaps down
- Never exceed speed: 180 kn (210 mph, 330 km/h)
- Rate of climb: 590 ft/min (3 m/s)
- Wing loading: 16 lb/sq ft (79 kg/m^{2})
- Power/mass: 0.12 kW/kg (0.073 hp/lb)

== See also ==
Aircraft of similar role, configuration, or era

- Grumman Ag Cat
