= Miles Whitney Straight =

M.11 Whitney Straight
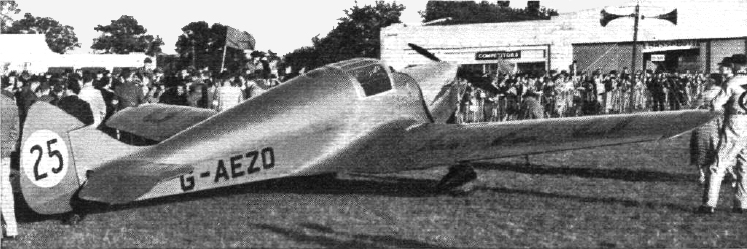
- M.11A Whitney Straight (G-AEZO), after finishing 2nd in the King's Cup Air Race at Hatfield, 11 September 1937

General information
- Type: sporting monoplane
- Manufacturer: Miles Aircraft
- Designer: Frederick George Miles
- Status: Withdrawn from service
- Number built: 50

History
- Manufactured: 1936-1937
- First flight: 14 May 1936

The Miles M.11 Whitney Straight was a 1930s twin-seat cabin monoplane designed and produced by the British aircraft manufacturer Miles Aircraft. It was named after Whitney Straight, a Grand Prix motor racing driver, aviator and businessman. The aircraft was the first to combine a side-by-side seating arrangement with an enclosed cockpit for the general aviation sector.

The Whitney Straight was developed after F.G. Miles and Straight recognised that they had similar ambitions to develop modern aircraft suited to flying clubs and private owners alike, and thus decided to collaborate on its production. On 14 May 1936, the first prototype conducted its maiden flight at Woodley Aerodrome; quantity production commenced shortly thereafter. Whitney Straights were used in various roles within the civil market, such as air racing and aerial topdressing.

Approaches were also made by Miles to introduce the Whitney Straight into the military market. While not selected as an army cooperation aircraft for the British Army in the pre-war years, numerous civil aircraft were impressed into military service during the Second World War, the type being largely operated as a communications aircraft. While production ended in 1937, several Whitney Straights remained in an airworthy condition into the twenty first century.

== Development ==
During late 1935, the Grand Prix motor racing driver, aviator and businessman Whitney Straight was engaged in efforts to establish numerous flying clubs to server major British towns. As a part of his efforts to popularise aviation, Straight sought a modern aeroplane that would be best suited for both club flying and use by private owners; specifically, he desired the envisioned aircraft to be considerably faster that the slow moving biplanes that traditionally dominated the market. It was also desirable for such a plane to feature a side-by-side seating arrangement in an enclosed cockpit, rather than an open cockpit that necessitated the cumbersome use of speaking tubes, in addition to more general attributes such as being reasonably easy to handle, safe to fly, and economic to both maintain and operate.

By this point, F.G. Miles of Philips and Powis had already established a favourable reputation due to, amongst other feats, the company's aircraft having been front runners in the King's Cup Race, thus the company was viewed by Straight as a natural partner for his envisioned aircraft. Upon being approached by Straight, Miles concurred with his aims, thus the two decided to collaborate on the development and marketing of such an aircraft, which was designated as the M.11 Whitney Straight. Work on the project proceeded at a relatively rapid pace, enabling the first prototype (G-AECT) to conduct its maiden flight at Woodley Aerodrome on 14 May 1936. Initially piloted by F.G. Miles, the prototype demonstrated the design to already be fulfilling expectations, particularly in regards to its ease of flight and comfort, while also achieving a 50 per cent speed increase over its biplane contemporaries.

Having been sufficiently pleased with the first prototype's early performance, quantity production of the Whitney Straight commenced as soon as possible, a state which was reportedly achieved by April 1936. Seeking to promote the type, F.G. Miles personally performed an intense tour around Europe to demonstrate and promote the Whitney Straight to potential customers; amongst the feats of the tour was a 17,000 ft flight above the Alps without the use of a supercharger-equipped engine. During April 1938, production of the type was terminated, by which point a total of 50 Whitney Straights had been completed.

== Design ==
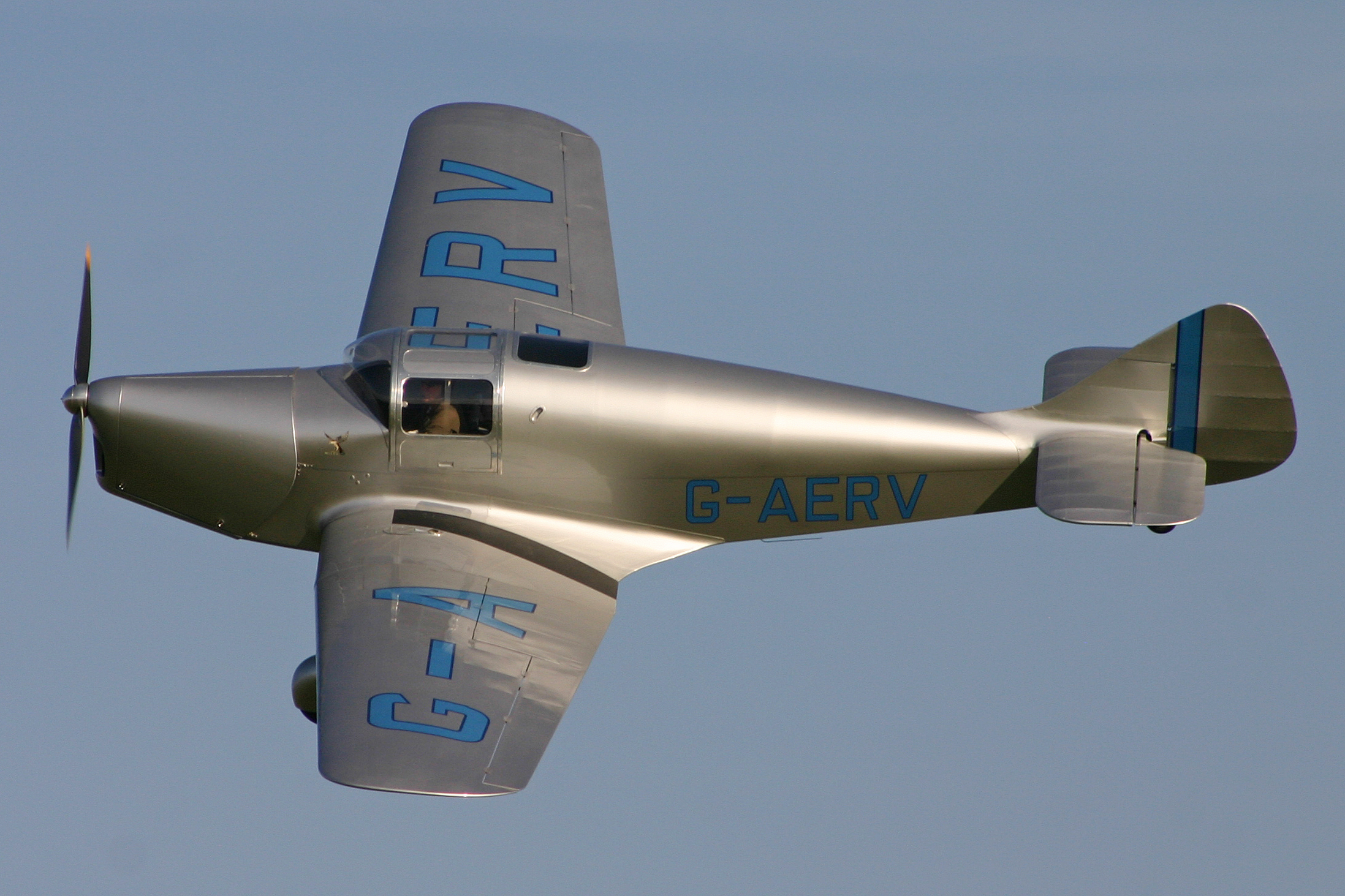
Miles Whitney Straight G-AERV in 2011

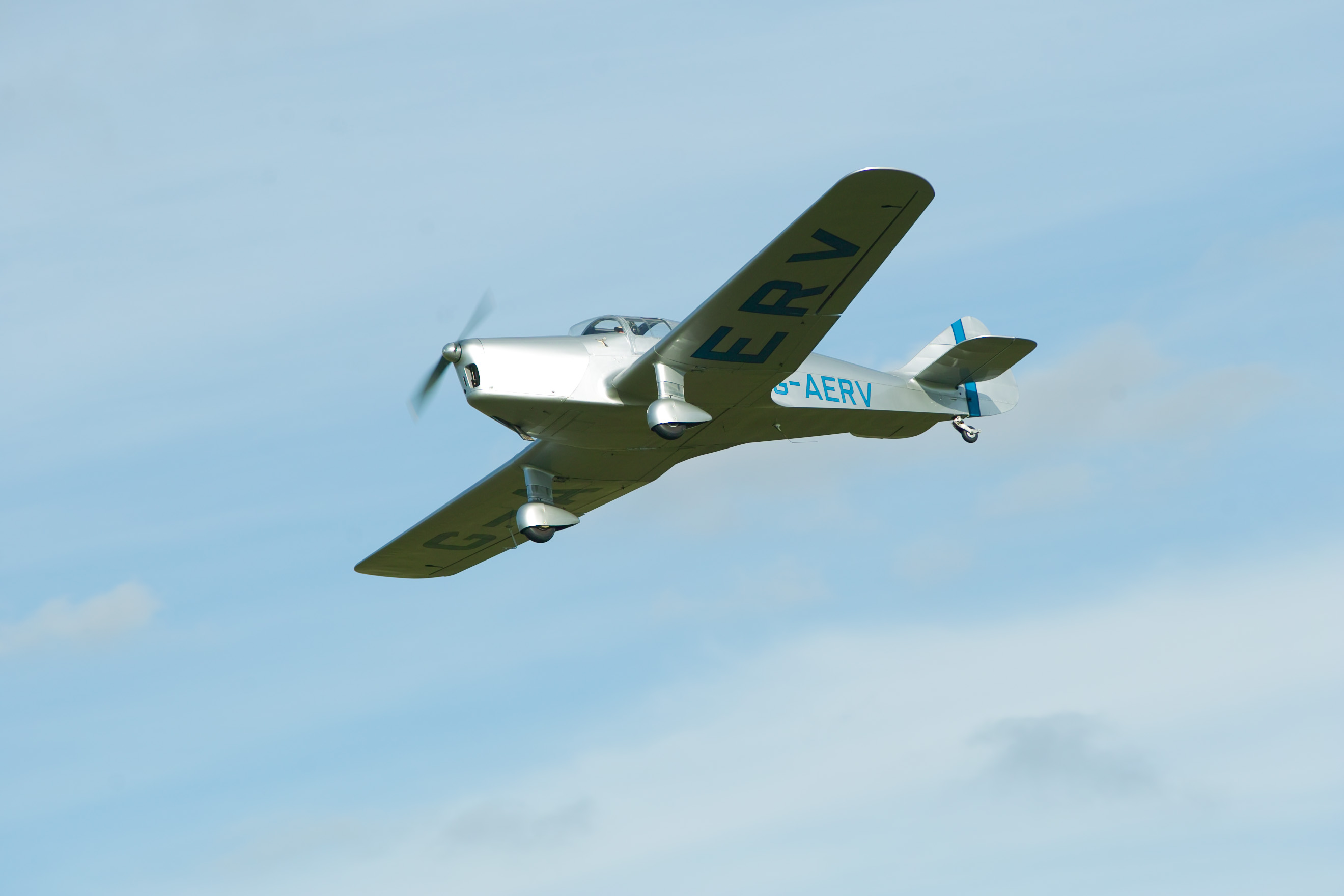
Miles Whitney Straight G-AERV in 2013

The Miles M.11 Whitney Straight was a twin-seat monoplane specifically built for use by flying clubs and private owners. Its construction was primarily composed of wood, including spruce frames and three-ply birch covering. The Whitney Straight featured a fixed main undercarriage complete with aerodynamic fairings, along with a fixed tailwheel. Relatively comfortable accommodation for its pilot, a single passenger and their luggage, was provided within an enclosed 'side-by-side' cockpit. The cockpit was covered by a single-piece canopy comprising molded Perspex.

The wings of the Whitney Straight were relatively thick for the era; considerable effort had been put into their design to carefully define their drag properties. The wings were fitted with vacuum-operated split flaps; these were attributed as having enabled the type's relatively low takeoff speed of 50 mph, as well as the aircraft's high rate of climb. An alternative flap arrangement, that was noticeably more efficient and produced less drag while increasing lift coefficient, was experimented with during the later years of the prototype's flying career; it directly influenced the design of several subsequent aircraft.

While early production aircraft were powered by a single 130 hp (97 kW) de Havilland Gipsy Major I piston engine, alternative powerplants, such as the Villiers Maya and Menasco Pirate engines, were also used. While a fixed-pitch propeller was used on most aircraft, at least one aircraft was furnished with a variable-pitch propeller that, amongst other benefits, further shortened the takeoff distance required and boosted its initial rate of climb.

The Whitney Straight was routinely promoted as possessing a high level of safety, largely as a consequence of its favourable handling characteristics. F.G. Miles frequently performed relatively dramatic demonstrations to validate this claim, closing the throttle while in a steep climb and releasing the controls for the aircraft to return to level flight of its own accord after only a steep dive. Even when flown at relatively low altitudes, its recovery abilities were impressive.

== Operational history ==
Numerous Whitney Straights participated in air racing events; in the 1937 King's Cup Race alone, one of the type placed second, while another came in fourth. Several Whitney Straights were also modified as engine test beds, as well as to test different flap designs.

On 28 June 1938, the sole M.11C (G-AEYI) to be built crashed at Harefield, Berkshire, resulting in the death of its test pilot, Wing Commander F.W. Stent.

Efforts were made by Miles to promote the Whitney Straight to military customers, including its pre-war submission as an army cooperation aircraft for the British Army. Shortly following the outbreak of the Second World War, the Air Ministry impressed 23 Whitney Straights into military service, in which capacity they were operated as communications aircraft. Twenty-one such aircraft were based in Britain, while one was stationed in India, and another in Egypt. At least one M.11A also served with the Fleet Air Arm between 1940 and 1943, while three were reportedly used by the Royal New Zealand Air Force.

Between 1939 and 1943, a New Zealand-based aircraft, piloted by Alan Prichard, participated in aerial seed sowing trials at Ninety Mile Beach, and was subsequently used for spreading superphosphate. These trials were part of the experiments which led to the development of aerial topdressing and the proliferation of aircraft for agricultural purposes.

While not produced in large numbers, examples of the type have frequently had particularly lengthy operating lives. At least one aircraft remained in an airworthy condition.

== Variants ==
Data from:British civil aircraft 1919-1972 Volume III

M.11
M.11B
the sole M.11B was powered by a 135 hp (101 kW) Amherst Villiers Maya I engine, adding 10 mph (9 kn; 16 km/h) to its maximum speed and 200 ft/min (1.0 m/s) to its rate of climb.
M.11C
the sole M.11C was powered by a 145 hp (108 kW) de Havilland Gipsy Major II engine driving a variable-pitch propeller.

== Operators ==
New Zealand

- Mount Cook Airline
- Royal New Zealand Air Force
  - No. 42 Squadron RNZAF

United Kingdom

- Royal Air Force
- Royal Navy
  - Fleet Air Arm
- Starways (G-AFGK)

== Survivors ==
- G-AERV, cn307 in England, UK (Still flying as of 29/05/2021).
- G-AFGK, cn509 at the Reynolds-Alberta Museum, Wetaskiwin, Alberta.

== Specifications (M.11A) ==
Data from Miles Aircraft since 1925, British Civil Aircraft 1919–1972: Volume III

General characteristics

- Crew: 1
- Length: 25 ft (7.6 m)
- Wingspan: 35 ft 8 in (10.87 m)
- Height: 6 ft 6 in (1.98 m)
- Wing area: 187 sq ft (17.4 m^{2})
- Aspect ratio: 6.8
- Empty weight: 1,275 lb (578 kg)
- Gross weight: 1,896 lb (860 kg)
- Fuel capacity: 30 imp gal (36 US gal; 136 L)
- Powerplant: 1 × de Havilland Gipsy Major I four cylinder air-cooled inverted in-line piston engine, 130 hp (97 kW)
- Propellers: 2-bladed fixed-pitch propeller

Performance

- Maximum speed: 145 mph (233 km/h, 126 kn)
- Cruise speed: 130 mph (210 km/h, 110 kn)
- Range: 570 mi (920 km, 500 nmi) on 30 imp gal (36 US gal; 136 L) fuel
- Service ceiling: 18,500 ft (5,600 m)
- Rate of climb: 850 ft/min (4.3 m/s)
- Wing loading: 10.2 lb/sq ft (50 kg/m^{2})

== See also ==
Related development

- Miles Monarch

Related lists

- List of aircraft of the RAF
