= Auster Agricola =

1950s British agricultural aircraft

Auster B8 Agricola
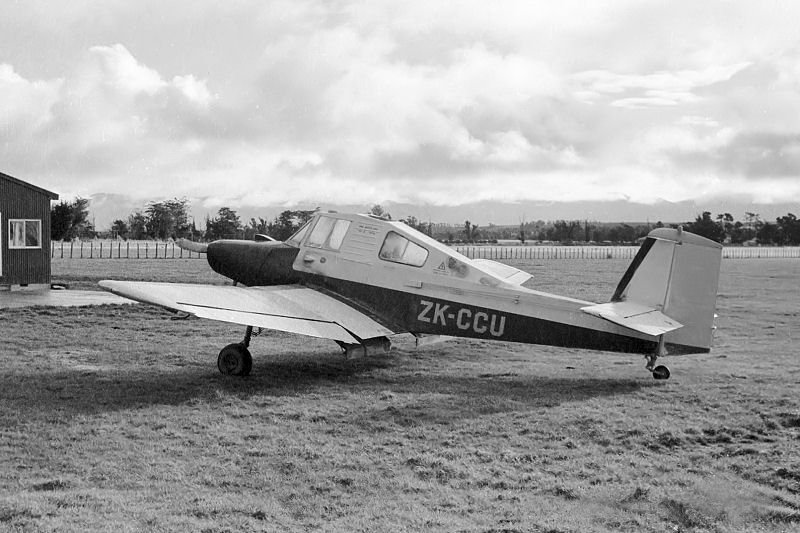
- Auster B.8 Agricola ZK-CCU

General information
- Type: Agricultural aircraft
- Manufacturer: Auster
- Status: 1 model survives
- Number built: 9

History
- First flight: 1955

The Auster B8 Agricola was a commercially unsuccessful British agricultural aircraft designed for the aerial topdressing market which opened up in New Zealand in the early 1950s.

== Design ==
Constructed of fabric over a corrosion-proofed steel frame, the design featured a large high-lift low-set monoplane wing, external control cables, fixed tailwheel undercarriage and a somewhat angular fuselage. It had an aft cabin that could seat two passengers, a hopper over the centre of the wing which could hold 750 kg of superphosphate in the topdressing role, or 654 litres of spray as a crop duster. The pilot sat forward of the hopper over the wing leading edge, a position which gave a good field of view compared with the American practice of placing the pilot behind the hopper, though this view was somewhat restricted by the extensive canopy joinery and bulky rear decking.

The Agricola's handling was generally described favourably, particularly its slow speed performance and controls, while its rugged and simple construction allowed for easy maintenance and repair. The aircraft was utilitarian rather than attractive; one website has short-listed the Agricola in a competition for the ugliest aircraft of all time. The type was first flown in 1955.

It was out-competed in its target market by the PAC Fletcher and attempts to sell the type for aerial application work in Britain, Australia and Europe met with little success. Only nine were made before production ceased. Of these ZK-BXO, is the sole survivor. Restored by John Stephenson of Whitianga, it was operated for many years by him as both a historic aircraft and personal transport. BXO was sold to the UK in 2005 and re-registered as G-CBOA. In March 2016, the aircraft was once again sold to New Zealand.

== Specifications (Auster Agricola) ==
Data from British Civil Aircraft since 1919 Volume 1

General characteristics

- Crew: one
- Capacity:
  - 144 imperial gallons (650 L; 173 US gal) insecticide or
  - 1,700 lb; 760 kg dry fertiliser or
  - 2 passengers
- Length: 28 ft 1 in (8.56 m)
- Wingspan: 42 ft 0 in (12.80 m)
- Height: 8 ft 4 in (2.54 m)
- Wing area: 254.7 sq ft (23.66 m^{2})
- Aspect ratio: 6.93:1
- Empty weight: 1,920 lb (871 kg)
- Max takeoff weight: 3,840 lb (1,742 kg)
- Powerplant: 1 × Continental O-470-B air-cooled flat-six engine, 240 hp (180 kW)

Performance

- Maximum speed: 127 mph (204 km/h, 110 kn)
- Cruise speed: 101 mph (163 km/h, 88 kn)
- Stall speed: 35 mph (56 km/h, 30 kn) (flaps down, power off)
- Range: 220 mi (350 km, 190 nmi)
- Service ceiling: 20,000 ft (6,100 m) (No payload), 10,500 ft (3,200 m) (3,675 lb (1,667 kg) weight)
- Rate of climb: 610 ft/min (3.1 m/s)

== See also ==
- Crop dusting
- Aerial topdressing
