= Transavia Corporation =

Australian aircraft manufacturer active 1965-1985

- Type: aircraft design and manufacture
- Founded: 1965
- Defunct: c. 1985
- Fate: ceased aircraft production
- Headquarters: Parramatta, Sydney
- Parent: Transfield

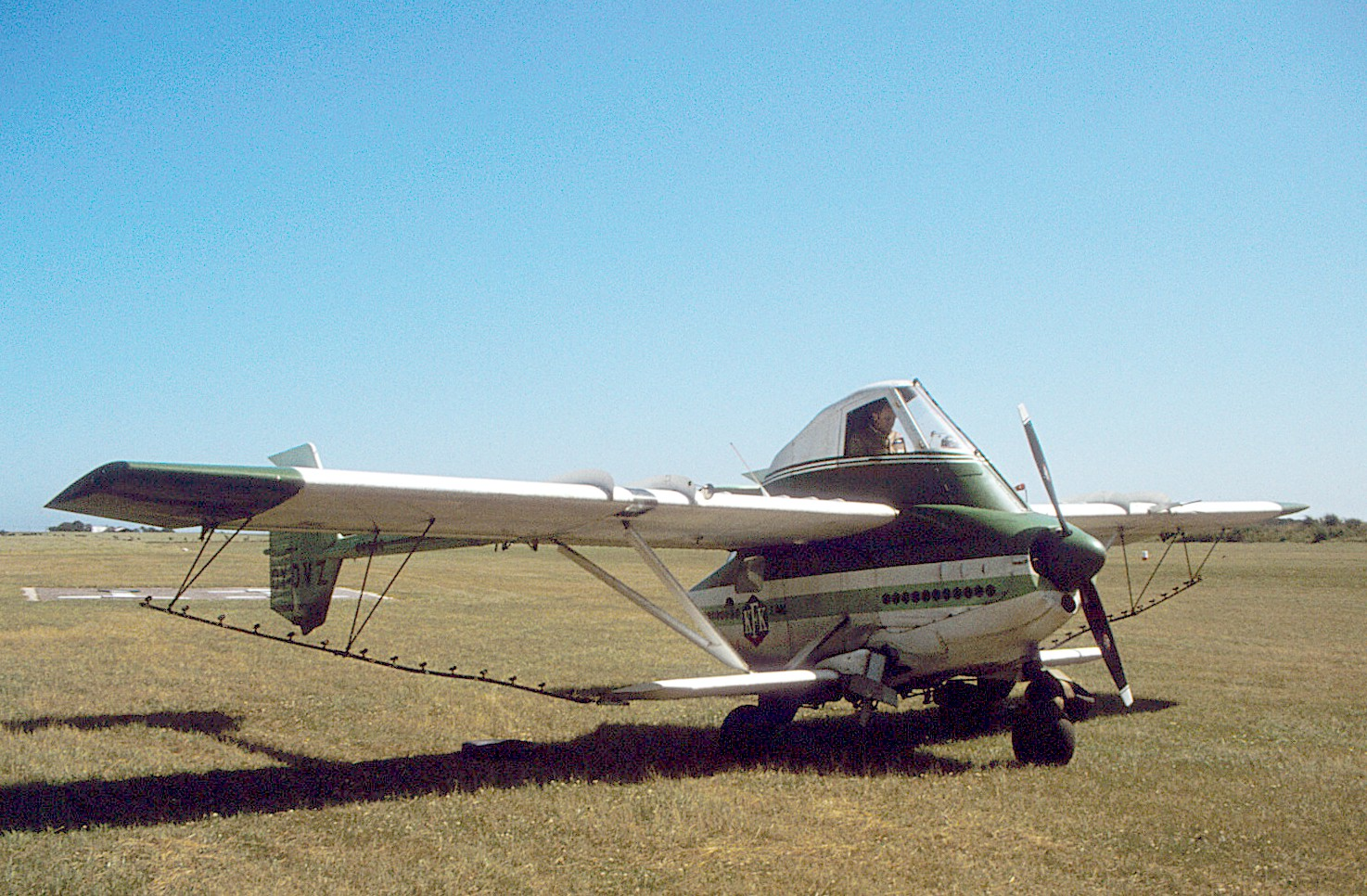
OY-DVZ Transavia PL-12 Airtruk c/n 1238 built 1972, seen here on July 14, 1983, at Svævethy glider club, Denmark

Transavia Corporation was an Australian aircraft manufacturer active between 1965 and 1985.

== Formation ==
Transavia Corporation was formed in 1965, as a subsidiary of Transfield to produce agricultural aircraft.

The initial design of the Airtruck had been done in New Zealand by Luigi Pellarini in 1956 as the single Kingsford Smith PL-7 tanker aircraft. This used parts from T-6 Texan aircraft and a Cheetah engine. Two further more refined PL-11 Airtruck aircraft were built in New Zealand during the early 1960s by Bennett Aviation, later Waitomo Aircraft.

The design was taken over by Transavia Corporation in 1965 and the company refined the aircraft's specification as the Transavia PL-12 Airtruk.

== Aircraft designs ==
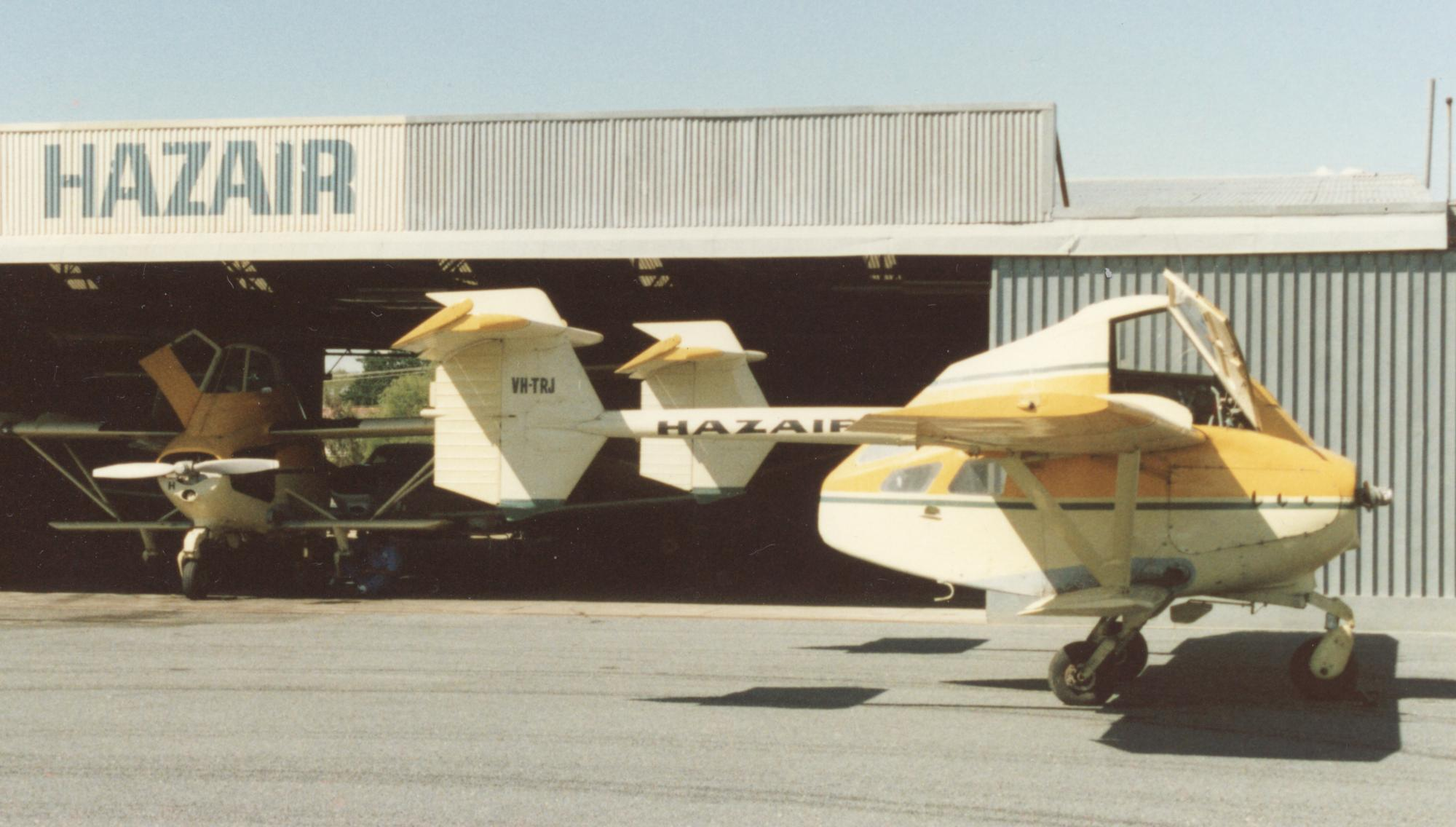
Transavia PL-12 Airtruks of Hazair at Albury Airport in March 1988

The PL-12 had an unconventional but practical layout for its intended agricultural top-dressing role. The basic layout was inherited from the PL-11. This was a mid-wing monoplane, but with a small lower "wing" that carried the wing bracing struts and the two main wheels of the tricycle undercarriage. Slender booms carried the two separate tailplanes on top of the fin/rudder units. The two booms were not joined together at the aircraft's rear.

The cockpit was located on top of a stubby fuselage, giving good visibility for low-level flying and the chemical hopper was situated below the pilot with a loading aperture just behind the cockpit. A cargo carrying utility version was also built. Power for early production was from a Continental IO-520-D 300 h.p. engine.

Further refinements in design in 1981 brought the PL-12-300 "Skyfarmer" with strengthened upper fuselage and a larger cockpit with roll-over truss. The final derivative was the PL-12-400 with a Lycoming I0-720 400 h.p. engine, larger dorsal fin and lower sesquiplane "wings". Total Airtruk production by Transavia was 118 aircraft. Examples are still in active operation.
