= Miles Monarch =

M.17 Monarch
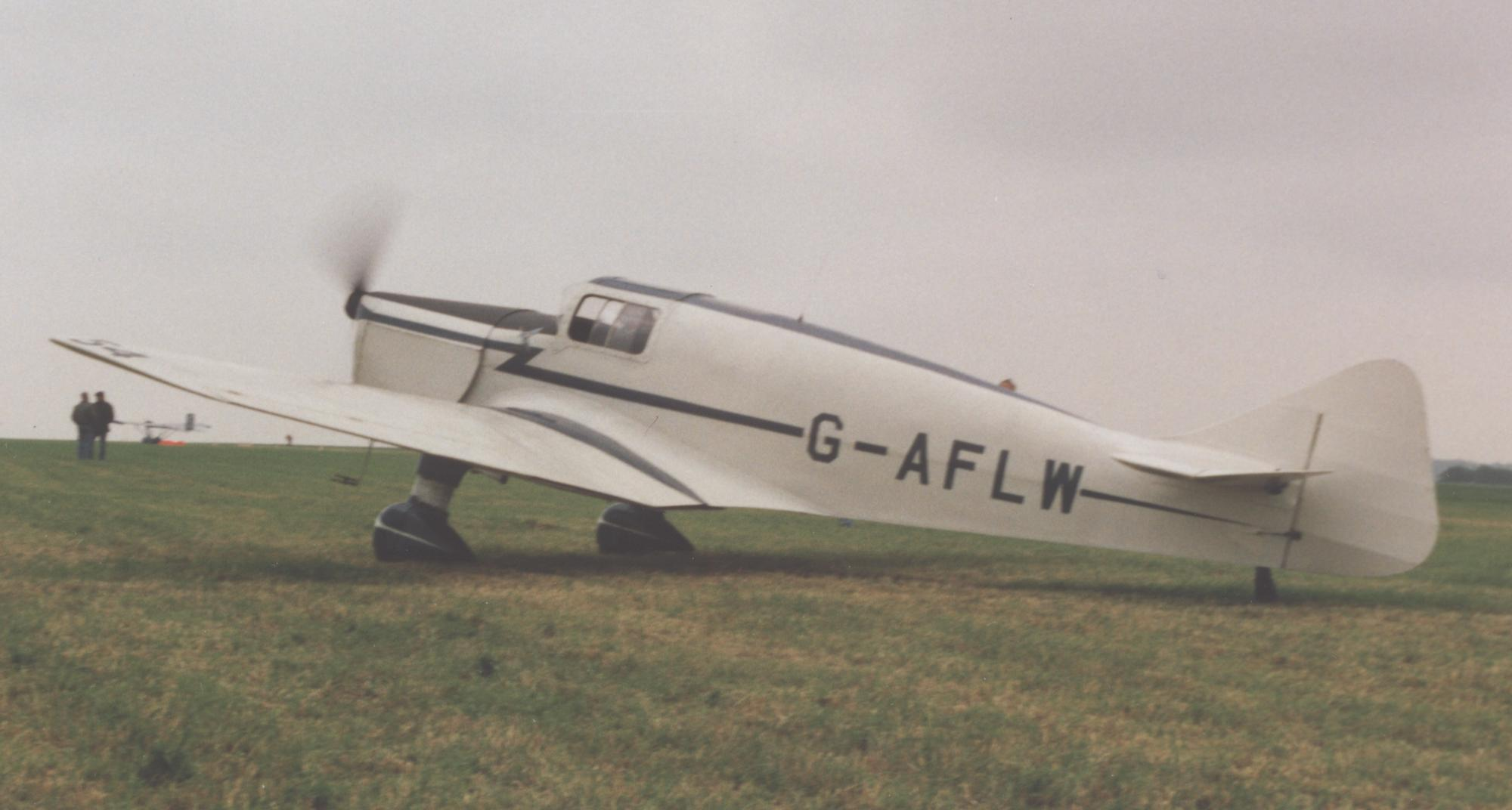
- Miles M.17 Monarch operational at Wroughton, Wiltshire, in July 1992

General information
- Type: Light civil touring aeroplane
- Manufacturer: Miles Aircraft Limited
- Designer: Frederick George Miles
- Primary user: Royal Air Force
- Number built: 11

History
- Manufactured: 1938-1939
- Introduction date: 1938
- First flight: 21 February 1938

The Miles M.17 Monarch was a British, light, touring aeroplane of the 1930s. It was a single-engine, three-seat, cabin monoplane with a fixed, tailwheel undercarriage.

== Development ==
The last civil type produced by Phillips and Powis before the war, the Monarch was a development of their earlier Whitney Straight. Compared to its sibling. the Monarch had an enlarged fuselage, allowing provision of a third seat in part of what had been the luggage space.

== Operational history ==
Eleven aircraft were built between 1938 and 1939, six of these to British customers, the rest going to export.

On the outbreak of war five of the British-registered machines were impressed by the Air Ministry; one machine belonging to Rolls-Royce acquired camouflage paint but remained in its owner's service. All but one of these survived the war, though a Dutch-registered aeroplane (PH-ATP) was destroyed in the Luftwaffe raid on Schiphol on 10 May 1940. One aircraft, OY-DIO, was on the Danish register until 9 Sept. 1939 and owned by a Dane named Hagedorn.

In the 1950s, one Monarch (G-AIDE) enjoyed some success as a racer in the hands of W.P. Bowles

For the most part, the remaining Monarchs led uneventful but useful careers; a number survived into the Sixties. G-AFJU is displayed at the National Museum of Flight at RAF East Fortune near East Linton, Scotland.

=== Sporting successes (G-AIDE) ===
- 1st - Goodyear Trophy (1957)
- 3rd - King's Cup Race (1957)
- 1st - Norton Griffiths Trophy (1958)
- 2nd - Osram Cup Race (1958)

== Operators ==
Belgium

- Belgian Air Force - One aircraft only.

United Kingdom

- Royal Air Force

== Specifications (M.17) ==
Data from Miles Aircraft since 1925, British Civil Aircraft 1919–1972: Volume III

General characteristics

- Crew: 1
- Capacity: 2 passengers
- Length: 25 ft 11.75 in (7.9185 m)
- Wingspan: 35 ft 7 in (10.85 m)
- Height: 8 ft 9.25 in (2.6734 m)
- Wing area: 180 sq ft (17 m^{2})
- Empty weight: 1,390 lb (630 kg)
- Gross weight: 2,150 lb (975 kg)
- Fuel capacity: 30 imp gal (36 US gal; 140 L) fuel (44 imp gal (53 US gal; 200 L) tank optional); 2.5 imp gal (3.0 US gal; 11 L) oil
- Powerplant: 1 × De Havilland Gipsy Major I 4-cylinder air-cooled inverted in-line piston engine, 130 hp (97 kW)
- Propellers: 2-bladed fixed-pitch propeller

Performance

- Maximum speed: 140 mph (230 km/h, 120 kn)
- Cruise speed: 125 mph (201 km/h, 109 kn)
- Range: 620 mi (1,000 km, 540 nmi) with 30 imp gal (36 US gal; 140 L) tank

910 mi (791 nmi; 1,465 km) with 44 imp gal (53 US gal; 200 L)

- Service ceiling: 17,400 ft (5,300 m)
- Rate of climb: 850 ft/min (4.3 m/s)
- Wing loading: 11.9 lb/sq ft (58 kg/m^{2})
- Take-off run: 435 ft (133 m) 5 mph (4.3 kn; 8.0 km/h) wing

== See also ==
Related development

- Miles Whitney Straight

Aircraft of comparable role, configuration, and era

- Percival Gull
