= Aerial topdressing =

Spreading of fertilisers over farmland using aircraft

Aerial topdressing is the aerial application of fertilisers over farmland using agricultural aircraft. It was developed in New Zealand in the 1940s and rapidly adopted elsewhere in the 1950s.

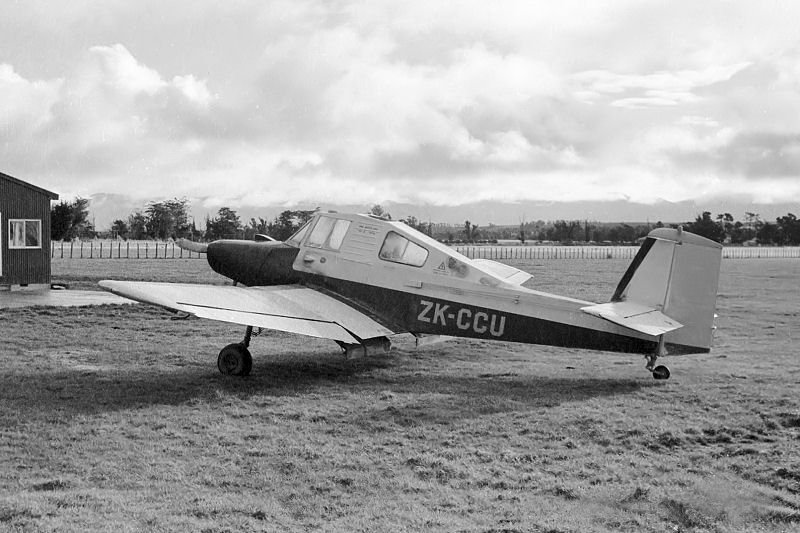
The Auster Agricola, a specialist aerial topdressing plane

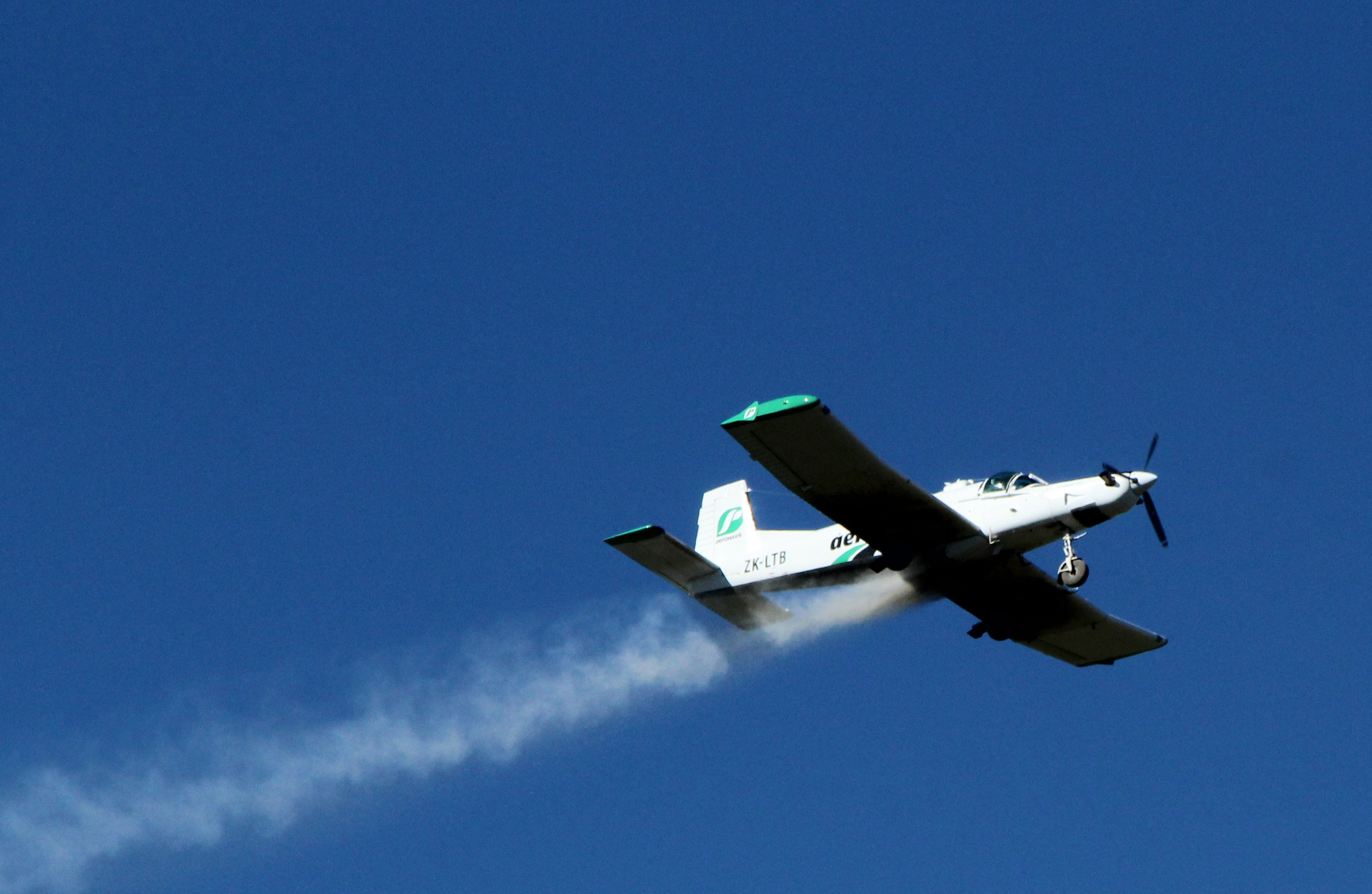
A PAC Cresco plane with the fertiliser emerging from between the wings

== Origins ==
=== Previous aerial applications ===
The first known aerial application of agricultural materials was by John Chaytor, who spread seed over a swamped valley floor in Wairoa, New Zealand, in 1906 using a hot air balloon with mobile tethers.

The first known use of a heavier-than-air machine in aerial application was on 3 August 1921 when, as a result of advocacy by Dr. Coad, a USAAC Curtiss JN4 Jenny piloted by John A. Macready was used to spread lead arsenate to kill catalpa sphinx caterpillars near Troy, Ohio, United States. The first commercial operations were attempted in the US in 1924 and use of insecticide and fungicide for crop dusting slowly spread in the Americas and, to a lesser extent, other nations. Crop dusting poisons enjoyed a boom in the US and Europe after World War II until the environmental impact of widespread use was recognised following the publication of Rachel Carson's Silent Spring in 1963. Crop dusting was not adopted in New Zealand until after top dressing was well established.

=== Early efforts ===
Initial interest in New Zealand concentrated on seed sowing, but much of New Zealand's central North Island farmland, given to returned servicemen after World War I, had proven deficient in trace minerals such as cobalt, copper and selenium, forcing difficult topdressing by hand in rough country, or abandoning the land for forestry. The possibility of using aircraft was soon investigated.

Spreading superphosphate by agricultural aircraft was independently suggested in 1926 by two New Zealanders, John Lambert of Hunterville and Len Daniell (Note: Just turned 25 he purchased his remote Wairarapa hill-country farm in the winter of 1913. Wearing a harness supporting a hand-operated seed distributor and towing packhorses, he began re-seeding his farm. Enlisting in 1915, he watched from the trenches in France and ached for the day the bomber aircraft might instead spread seed and fertilizer on Wairere. When it became known Henry Ford had invested in the heavy cargo-carrying aircraft industry, he at once wrote to Ford pointing out this potential but never received an acknowledgment from Ford. To the irritation of the new leaders of the new aerial-topdressing industry, Len always remained an advocate of so much less accident-prone large aircraft, in particular Bristol Freighters. He believed real cargo aircraft to be properly powered and designed and built for the job. Furthermore, the industry as it developed with small aircraft required substantial farmer investment in infrastructure unnecessary for the big planes. Accordingly, he declined persistent offers of directorships of their companies, instead long maintaining hopeful watch on SAFE.) of Wairere. There was some publicity when in 1936 Hawkes Bay farmer Harold McHardy used a de Havilland Gypsy Moth to sow clover seed on his own land. This led the Soil Conservation and Rivers Control Council to decide to fund aerial sowing and topdressing trials in 1937 to prevent erosion, but little progress was made, despite strong advocacy by Doug Campbell.

At that time it was illegal to drop anything from an aircraft, which dissuaded several advocates who felt a law change was needed before experiments could begin.

=== Alan Prichard ===
The idea of spreading seed also occurred to Alan Prichard, a pilot for the New Zealand Public Works Department, as he was flying E. Madden of the Ministry of Works in a de Havilland Moth, sharing grapes and throwing the seeds out of the open cockpits. A few months later Prichard was tasked with conducting an aerial survey in Northland. The survey was delayed when the Ministry's Miles Whitney Straight, ZK-AFH, was grounded by bad weather.

A supervisor, J. L. Harrison, complained that Prichard was holding back men needed to sow lupin seed. Remembering the grape seeds, Prichard suggested sowing the seed by air. Burying the hatchet, Harrison and Prichard spent that evening experimenting with methods of dispersal, before settling on sewing a sack onto a piece of downpipe. The following morning, 8 March 1939, Prichard flew over Ninety Mile Beach while Harrison, on his signal, held the downpipe out a window and emptied the sack. They then landed and examined the spread of the seeds. It was found a distribution of 1 seed per square foot was obtained from a height of 100 to 150 feet (46 m). On Monday 10 March, they sowed 375 acres (1.52 km^{2}), using 2 lb/acre (224 kg/km^{2}) instead of the 5 lb/acre (560 kg/km^{2}) used when sowing by hand. The pair returned to examine the site at 2 weeks, 1 month and 2 years and at all points the aerially sown land was indistinguishable from that sown by hand.

Prichard wrote up the experiment in the NZ Journal of Agriculture (vol 70 p117-120). This came to the attention of the Minister Bob Semple, who Prichard occasionally flew as a VIP. Semple asked how Prichard had obtained permission. Prichard admitted he had not, and had "cribbed" back the time in the ZK-AFH's logbooks by extending the time of other flights. Semple encouraged Prichard to continue, adding "Don't let anyone catch you, and if they do, send them to me". After the outbreak of World War II, he had the good fortune to retain the use of ZK-AFH, when most aircraft were impressed for war service. Prichard conducted various trials between 1939 and 1943, from an early stage adding fertiliser to the seeds, which was found to dramatically improve growth. The success of the fertiliser was such that his trials came to concentrate on this aspect, and its possible application to existing pasture.

As a result of Prichard's experiments, in 1945 the Department of Agriculture estimated aerial topdressing would cost about £4 per ton of fertiliser (on a basis of 2 cwt per acre), which was economic (actually, this price turned out to be a significant overestimate). Prichard now found an ally who could officially sanction further trials.

=== Doug Campbell ===
Doug Campbell was an agricultural academic concerned about soil erosion. He had been suggesting the spread of both seed and fertiliser for erosion control and aerial spreading of trace minerals since the 1930s, but had not conducted trials until he met Prichard. Campbell brought official backing and academic responsibility to Prichard's work. Immediately after the war, he obtained permission to build a sheet metal hopper for ZK-AFH to test the spread of bluestone crystals. In 1946 the first pure topdressing flight was conducted without seed. Mixtures of bluestone crystals, sulphate of ammonia, slaked lime and carbon black were used. The lack of a lid for the hopper initially resulted in irritating dust spreading through the aircraft in turbulence: in cold wet conditions it was necessary to heat the hopper to prevent the fertiliser coagulating, while in dry conditions the powder tended to disperse in the wind before reaching the ground. Nevertheless, in July Campbell arranged for ZK-AFH to topdress 1,100 acres (4.5 km^{2}) of a copper-deficient farm. In August 1947 trials with cobalt sulphate in liquid form were conducted on the farm of K. M. Hickson near Taumarunui, with a horseback-mounted radio used to convey results to the pilot. It was soon suggested that cobaltised superphosphate would be easier to spread, although it was felt a specialised aircraft would be needed to do this.

Campbell published his research in the New Zealand Journal of Science and Technology, Volume X, 1948 as "Some observations on top dressing in New Zealand".

Convinced by the trials, Campbell formed the co-ordinating and advisory committee on aerial topdressing with representatives from the Ministry of Public Works, Department of Agriculture, Department of Air, DSIR and the Soil Conservation Council. At the committee's first meeting on 27 November 1947 it resolved to ask the Royal New Zealand Air Force for assistance.

=== RNZAF trials ===
Between the second world war and the cold war, the RNZAF was a large and competent organisation without a lot of work to do. It responded enthusiastically to Campbell's suggestion, initially proposing to use Tiger Moth and DC-3 aircraft, but concerns about corrosion lead them to use "expendable" war surplus Grumman Avengers.

Experiments were resumed on 5 September 1948 using a Miles Whitney Straight and three Grumman Avengers; the RNZAF put superphosphate in a converted long range fuel tank in Avenger NZ2504 and dropped it over the concrete runway at Ohakea. (NZ2504 is now preserved in the Royal New Zealand Air Force Museum).

The superphosphate was too powdery but a more granular form was found before final trials measuring distribution pattern of spread by air on 16 September 1948. The results were considered very promising. Trials proceeded to hill country at Te Mata near Raglan, and were extended to three other sites.

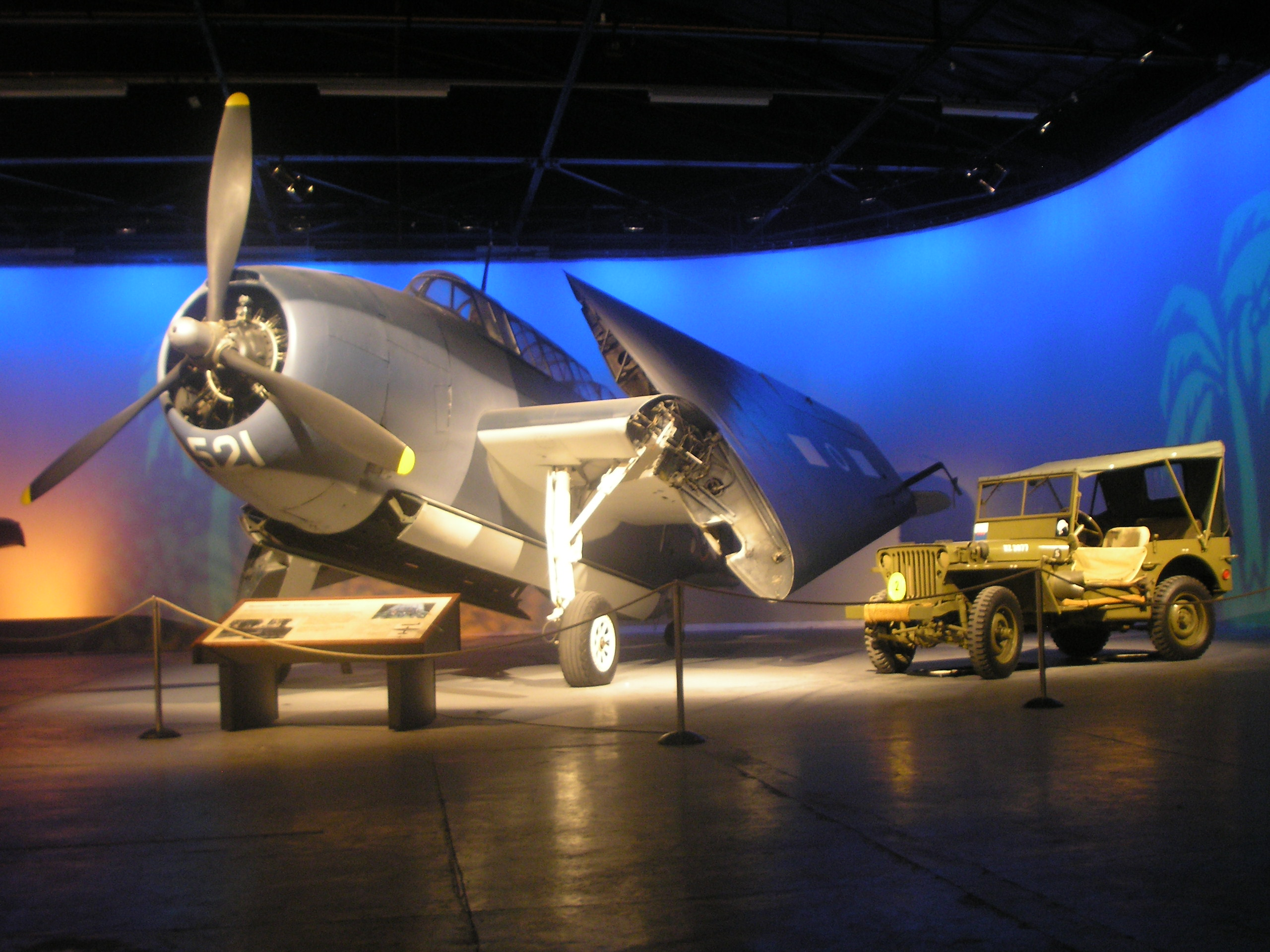
A Grumman Avenger used in the trials, preserved in the RNZAF Museum

For 1949 a Research and Development flight was formed under Stan Quill, equipped with the three Avengers and a Douglas DC-3, while instructions were sent to England to modify 2 RNZAF Miles Aerovans then on the production line to carry one-ton hoppers. A ground convoy of station wagon, car, one-ton truck, jeep, fuel tanker and radio van supported them. The 1948 fuel tank was replaced by a hopper with sides angled at 60° with a vibrating rod to loosen the superphosphate. Large-scale topdressing started on 14 March 1949 spreading clover-super mix. The "Topdress III" trials culminated on 21 May 1949 with a demonstration drop on 11 different properties close to Masterton in front of large numbers of farmers and press. These trials were calculated to have spread 2.5 cwt/acre (31,000 kg/km^{2}) at an all-up cost of 15 shillings ($1.50) per acre (4047 m^{2}), despite the use of inappropriately over-powered combat aircraft. Further public displays were given to cabinet ministers on 30 August at Johnsonville, on 9 September at Ohakea and at a 17 September Air Force Day air show. As these trials were a resounding success, in addition to the Aerovans, 12 Bristol Freighters then under construction for the RNZAF were modified to take superphosphate hoppers.

Following these successful trials, in 1950, farmers' groups lobbied the government to have the RNZAF provide subsidised topdressing with the Bristol freighters and even advocated using large Handley Page Hastings. But by this time government work was being overtaken by private enterprise as ex-airforce pilots bought New Zealand-built De Havilland Tiger Moth biplanes cheaply, placed a hopper in the front seat and went into business flying from the paddocks of any farmer willing to pay. The government became reluctant to spend money on interfering with the increasing number of commercial operators.

== Research in other nations ==
=== Australia ===
The first experimental topdressing in Australia was done by a private Tiger Moth in 1948.

=== Great Britain ===
Faced with far greater difficulty of operating aircraft from small British farms, the British Government assumed topdressing aircraft would need to operate from an ordinary runway. Economies of scale then dictated using large aircraft, which would in turn have to fly higher. Accordingly, in 1950 the RAF conducted trials over Scottish farm land with Avro Lincoln and Avro Lancaster bombers carrying canvas trays with 5 tons of superphosphate in 14 lb (6.4 kg) and 28 lb (13 kg) paper bags designed to burst on impact. These trials were a failure due to poor spread achieved from the bags. The Bristol Aeroplane Company conducted private trials on hill country in the same year with scaled-up versions of the New Zealand hoppers fitted to Bristol Freighters. The success of these trials was widely publicised through Farmers' Weekly magazine. Hopper conversions were marketed for the Freighter and the even larger Handley Page Hastings. However low capitalisation for start up costs and the difficulties of low level operation in large transports led British private industry to use smaller machines, even though they could not operate directly from farms.

== Success in New Zealand ==
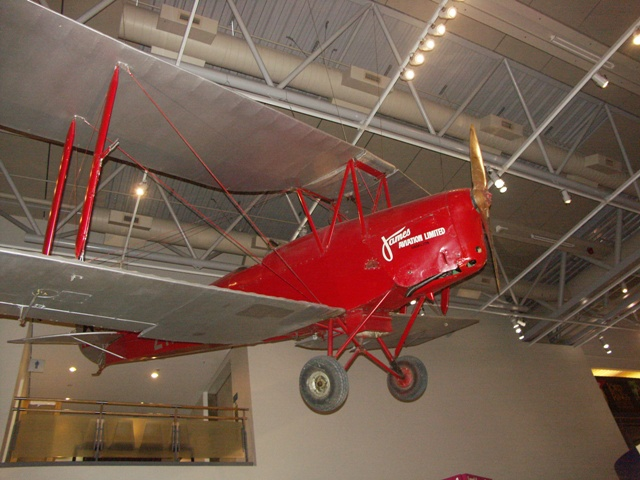
James Aviation Tiger Moth at Te Papa—National Museum of New Zealand

Several factors lay behind the development of aerial topdressing in New Zealand. The New Zealand public service gave its employees time and resources to pursue their ideas and publish research. Many farms included hill country, where it was impossible to spread fertiliser by truck. New Zealand farms tended to be large enough to make the costs worthwhile. New Zealand farmers were well educated and enjoyed the third highest standard of living in the world. High prices for lamb, beef, and wool in the early 1950s gave farmers the extra capital. World War II had left behind cheap, war-surplus Tiger Moths and highly trained ex-air force pilots.

The majority of the 40,000 plus New Zealanders trained by the RNZAF were aircrew. Most were sent to Europe, and served in squadrons where the ground crew were from the United Kingdom. On returning to their rural homes, many bought cheap war-surplus aircraft, particularly the Tiger Moth primary trainer, available for £100. These were used for weekend flying, but also dropping fencing, feed and people into remote areas, as well as occasional aerial sowing and dropping of rabbit poison.

By the end of 1949 there were five firms; Airwork had five Tiger Moths, James Aviation three, Aircraft Services three, Gisborne Aerial topdressing (which was to become Field Air) had one, and Southern Scenic Airtrips had converted an Auster. In addition Wally Harding was top dressing his own property with his private Tiger Moth. Rex Garnham started Rangitikei Air Services with one DH82 and held the first Aerial application license Within the following five years nearly 50 other companies—mostly one-man operations—joined as competition. Collectively, they were called the 'Super men', and when amalgamation occurred it was these pioneers who came to dominate the New Zealand industry.

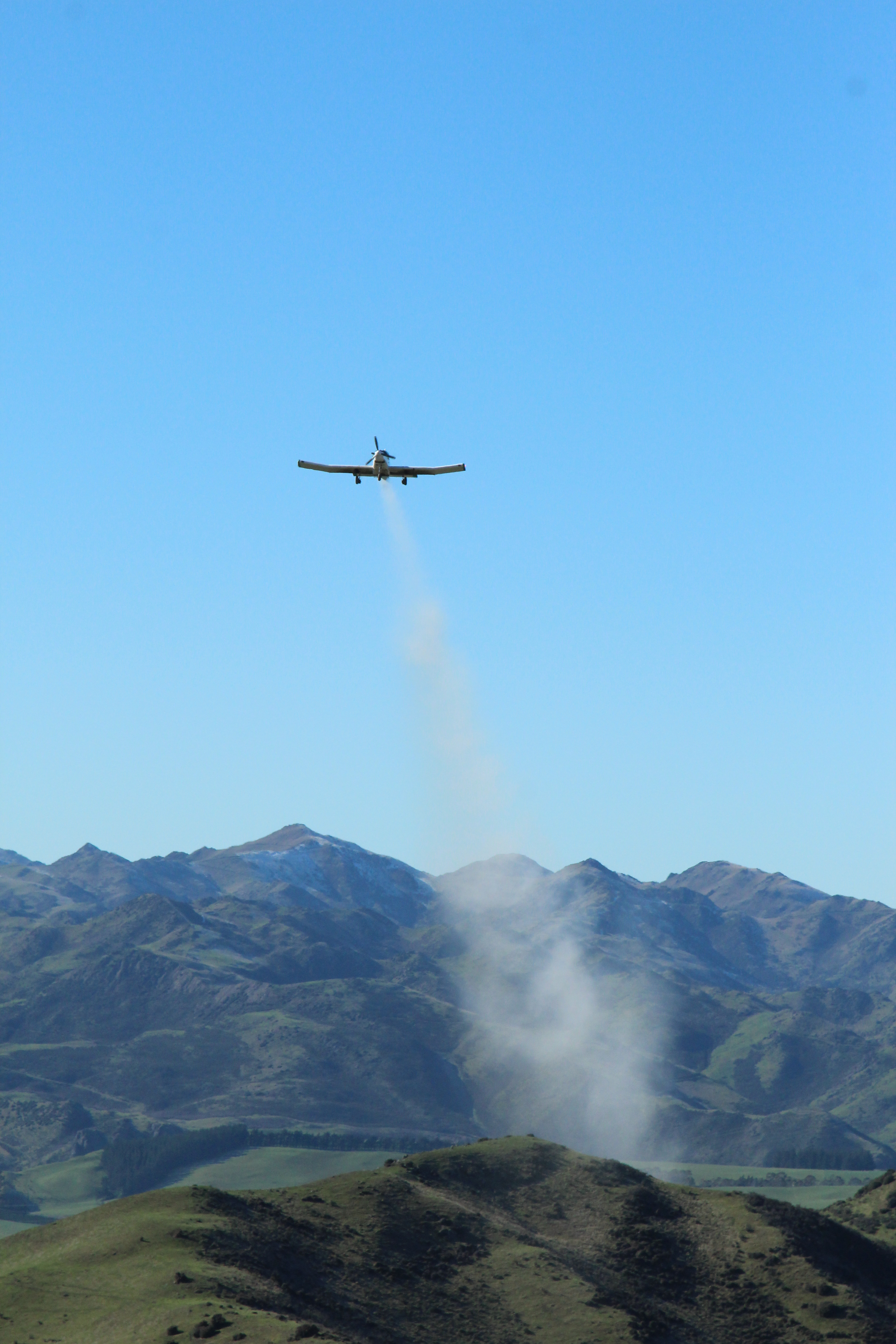
Topdressing in rugged conditions in New Zealand

=== Airwork (NZ) ===
Since 1947, Airwork (NZ) Limited had been operating Tiger Moths for rabbit killing by spreading poisoned carrots in Canterbury. In early May 1949 Charles Brazier used ZK-ASO to spread lime. Airwork was aware that Fred "Popeye" Lucas had conducted aerial seeding as well as rabbit poisoning and discussed the possibility of dropping seeds with fertiliser (as Prichard had done) with Ces Worrell, a grain and seed merchant. He suggested spreading superphosphate alone would be more profitable, (a suggestion he may have wished he had kept to himself—the following year, Worrell started a rival firm, Aerial Sowing). Acting on Worral's suggestion, Airwork arranged a public demonstration on Sir Heaton Rhodes's property at Tai Tapu, south of Christchurch, on 27 May 1949. They advertised spreading superphosphate for £5 per ton, and several orders came from the audience.

Airwork pioneered the technique of landing on the farmer's property, loading and turning the aircraft round in three or four minutes. To save time, bulk loading from a vehicle was pioneered instead of emptying bags into the hopper. For the first drop a hurriedly converted Hupmobile was used, but this soon broke down and was replaced by a Land Rover chassis fitted with hydraulic arms. This investment was justified when Pyne Gould Guinness placed the first large contract at Christmas 1949. Airwork would go on to have a major role in the development of the Fletcher aircraft.

=== Fieldair ===
Lawson Field (1896–1981), a farmer and pilot, converted one of Gisborne Aero Club's de Havilland Tiger Moths, Barbara II, so that Ken Young could drop superphosphate during the week and the club could fly the plane at weekends. The arrangement was typical of the system adopted by all early firms; a steep sided hopper was installed in the Tiger Moth's front seat, which the pilot, by pulling a lever, opened the vent at the bottom to release its load. When the club complained the hopper could not be removed from the passenger seat without causing structural damage, Field bought Barbara II and started the Gisborne Aerial Topdressing Company on 2 August 1949. He calculated his first drop cost £2.10s. per ton of fertiliser, and he was able to charge farmers £5 per ton. In September 1949 he became the founding president of the New Zealand Aerial Work Operators' Association, later the Aviation Industry Association of New Zealand. In 1951 he renamed the company Fieldair Limited and brought in modern De Havilland Canada DHC-2 Beavers, and in 1955 Lockheed Lodestars and DC-3s. Fieldair developed the tractor-mounted hopper loader, adopted throughout the industry, and became the largest topdressing firm in the country by the time of Field's death in 1981.

Fieldair's logo is a strangled goose. According to legend, a hungry Fieldair pilot flying between airstrips saw a single goose which looked like dinner. His somewhat hopeful method was to attempt to manoeuvre alongside the bird, side slip into it and grab hold. The first few attempts failed and the goose got wise. A dogfight developed, and both fliers lost altitude. A hundred feet over a gully the goose broke towards the aircraft, and hit the prop, breaking it. The pilot force-landed, and concocted a suitable story of a bird strike, which was undone when the farmer requested the company's services, as "You blokes must have the best pilots in the country ... one of your blokes chased this goose around my farm for about a half an hour. He must have just missed by inches every tree on my place. And to top it off this bloke succeeded in killing the goose and landed to pick it up". (Ewing & MacPherson, p182).

=== Wanganui Aero Work ===
Wally Harding, a pioneer Waiouru farmer, converted his Tiger Moth into a top dresser in 1949 to use on his own not particularly productive high country station. The following year he founded Wanganui Aero Work Ltd. By 1954 the company added the first PAC Fletcher to its five Tiger Moths. It also operated Beavers, Ceres, Cessna 180/185s, Piper PA-25 Pawnees, Piper Cubs and Cessna AGwagons, but eventually standardised on Fletchers for its fixed-wing fleet, purchasing eight PAC Crescos when these were introduced. In 2004 the family business was bought out by Ravensdown Fertiliser Cooperative, although two of Wally's grandsons remain in the company: Bruce, chief pilot, and Rick, operations Manager. The fleet currently consists of eight Crescos, two Fletchers, and one each Robinson R44, Bell 206B, Aerospatiale AS350, Hughes 369C and McDonnell Douglas MD520N helicopters. In 2013 Wanganui Aero Works changed from their famous red and white markings to a cleaner, white livery as a result of the buy-out by Ravensdown.

=== James Aviation ===
Ossie James was another pilot and farmer who started with a Tiger Moth salvaged from floodwaters in 1948 and progressed to owning the largest fleet of Fletchers in the country. James Aviation flew a number of Douglas DC-3s and Lockheed Model 18 Lodestars as well as Fletchers. James was heavily involved in the New Zealand International Field Days, the Salvation Army, and Waikato Aero Club. Ossie James was made a Distinguished Companion of the New Zealand Order of Merit in 2004.

== Aircraft ==
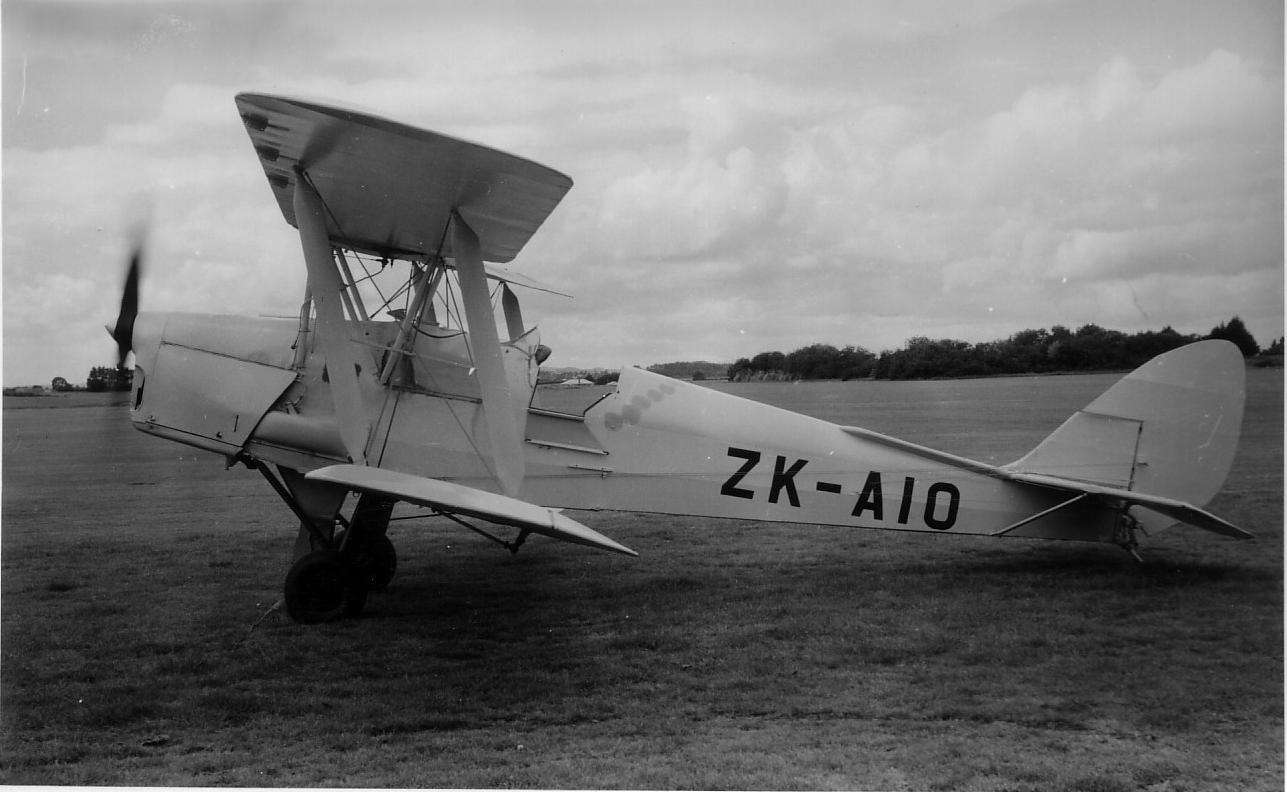
Typical of many, pre-war Tiger Moth ZK-AIO was converted to topdressing in early 1950 and lost in a crash the same year.

By 1952 there were 38 firms in the business in New Zealand, operating 149 aircraft, of which 138 were Tiger Moths. A smattering of higher powered de Havilland Canada DHC-2 Beavers were the only modern types. By 1956 there were 182 aerial topdressing Tiger Moths but it was obvious the lightweight Tiger Moths would need to be replaced. At the beginning of the 1950s there were no specialist designs for even crop dusters, due to the proliferation of World War II surplus trainers. But for topdressing something larger and more robust was needed.

=== War surplus ===
Conversions of more robust World War II aircraft started. In 1954 the RNZAF had conducted some further topdressing tests at Masterton using a Bristol Freighter fitted with three 2-ton hoppers. To appease higher government command the aircraft was given a civilian registration, ZK-BEV, and hired to the private company 'Industrial Flying Limited'. These trials lead to large numbers of heavy twin-engined types, such as Douglas DC-3s and Lockheed Lodestars being converted for topdressing. The Harvard and its Australian-built counterpart the CAC Wirraway were adapted by rebuilds, the Wirraway into the CAC Ceres. Bits of Harvards were used by Luigi Pellerini to make most of the bizarre twin-tailed cockpit-over-the-engine PL-11 Airtruck. Flight tested at Te Kūiti in 1950 this aircraft not only had a long and successful career but was put into production (as an all-new-built aircraft) in Australia, the Transavia PL-12 Airtruk that also appeared in one of the Mad Max movies.

=== Existing designs ===
The DHC Beaver was purchased in numbers and there were abortive plans to build it under license in New Zealand, but its high wing and bulky cabin were unsuited to the role. In the UK Miles Aerovans proved underpowered. In the Eastern Bloc, where economy mattered less, the Antonov An-2 was used for the role.

== Developing specialist machines ==
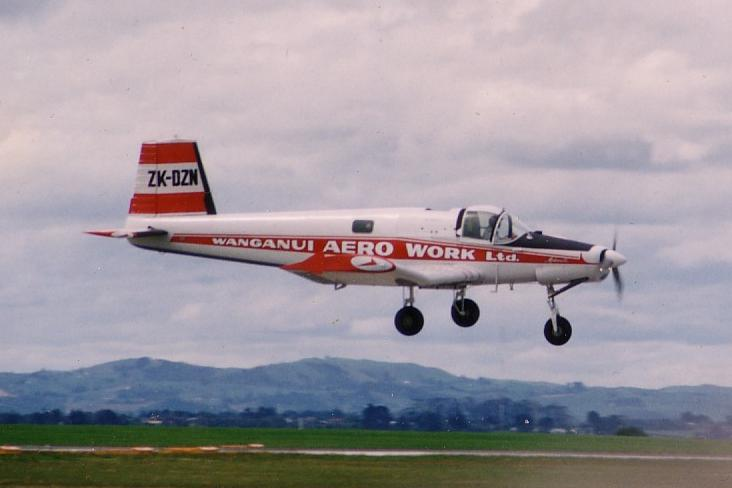
Fletcher Fu24

Entirely new designs were clearly needed in Australasia. In Britain Auster produced the Auster Agricola and Percival the Percival EP-9 for the New Zealand market. Both were robust but primitive fabric-covered aircraft. In Australia the small but more advanced Yeoman Cropmaster was developed.

In the United States Fletcher Aviation Corporation was persuaded by a delegation of New Zealanders to develop an aircraft for the New Zealand market and Jim Thorpe adapted a design for the FD-25 Defender light attack aircraft into the Fletcher Fu24, a stressed skin monoplane with a high lift wing. It had more than three times the load capacity of the Tiger Moth and the cockpit located well forward, ahead of the hopper, giving the pilot all round view. This—with a few changes such as an enclosed cockpit—turned out to be the winning formula and orders soon reached three figures. Cable Price Corporation funded two prototypes with the New Zealand Meat Producers Board acting as financial guarantor—Gibson having brow-beaten a reluctant Fletcher board into building a prototype. Airparts was formed to assemble the American kits. The first prototype was flown in America in June 1954, the second in New Zealand in September 1954 and it received type approval in May 1955. A hundred Fletcher kits were delivered to New Zealand that year. Airparts bought out the rights and continued development locally.

Specialist crop dusters such as the Schweizer Agcat emerged in America in the mid-1950s, designed for the flat mid-west. These generally had poorer forward vision and lesser payload to weight ratios than the Fletcher, which continued to dominate the New Zealand market—however, in places where aircraft primarily were used to drop insecticide, these American designs were superior.

=== Pacific Aerospace ===
The Fletcher was responsible for starting New Zealand's small aircraft building industry. Having taken over from Air Parts and AESL, Pacific Aerospace is

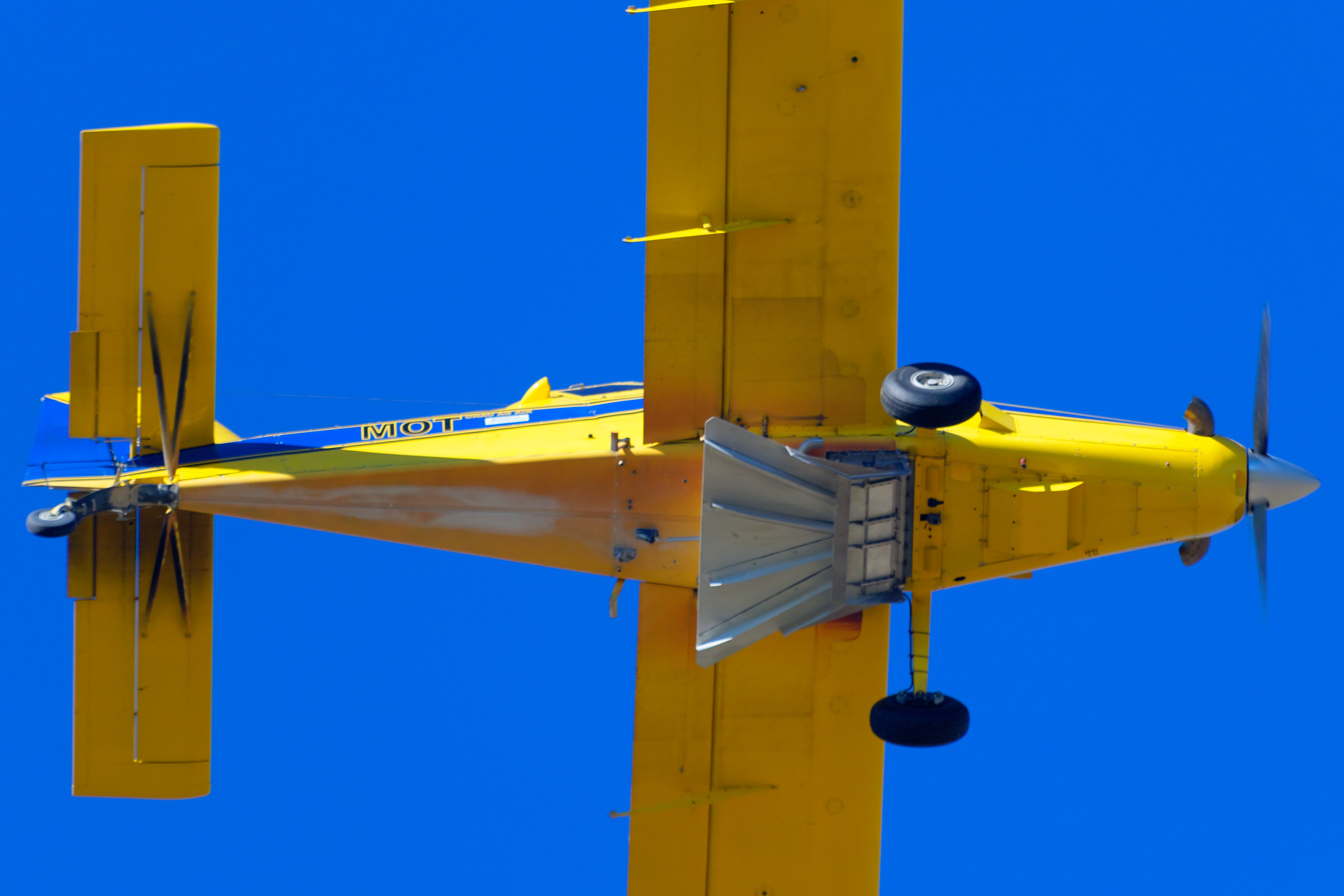
Air tractor AT402B underside details

the manufacturer of the PAC Fletcher and the similar but larger and turboprop powered PAC Cresco, as well as the PAC 750XL and PAC CT/4 Airtrainer. Pacific Aerospace of Hamilton is New Zealand's largest aircraft manufacturer. Fletchers and Crescos have been exported to Australia, Africa, the Middle East and South America. Differences between the demands of American and European markets, as well as entry barriers, have ensured the Antipodean style of topdresser did not compete with the cockpit behind the hopper designs of American manufacturers.

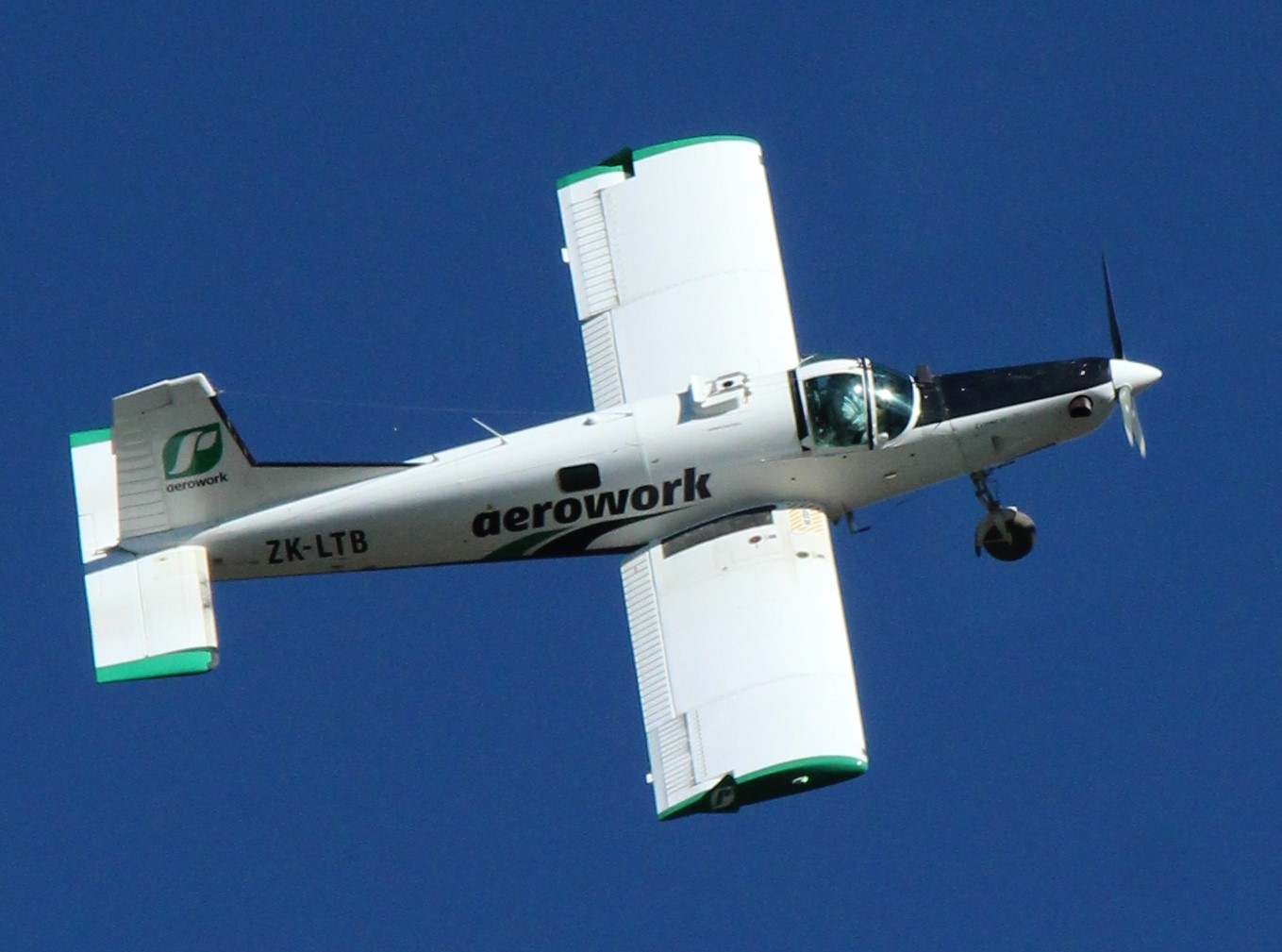
PAC Cresco in a hard banking turn at the end of a run

== Mature industry ==
The amount of fertiliser used in aerial topdressing rose from almost nothing in 1950 to over 250,000 tons in 1955, to over 450,000 tons in 1960 and to over 900,000 tons in 1965, approximately doubling every five years. By 1958 there were 73 aerial topdressing firms in New Zealand, flying 279 aircraft—although the amount of superphosphate dropped and the area it fell on would continue to increase—from then on the numbers of companies, aircraft and pilots dropped as the larger more expensive Fletchers came to dominate the market and the one-man companies that began in the 1940s were amalgamated.

By 1965 the million tons of superphosphate dropped annually was being spread over 9 million acres (36,000 km^{2}). The amount an aircraft dropped had increased from 2.5 tons to 8 tons and there were 10,000 privately owned airstrips for topdressing in New Zealand. Other work was also done by agricultural aircraft, as in foreign countries, particularly outside the February to May prime season. Clover seed is sown and spraying is carried out with insecticides, fungicides and weedkillers as well as general utility work. Aerial Topdressing has been attributed with vastly increasing agricultural production—in New Zealand alone, sheep numbers increased from 40 million to over 70 million, the majority of the increase being attributed to the increased feed that superphosphate made available.

== Environmental impact ==
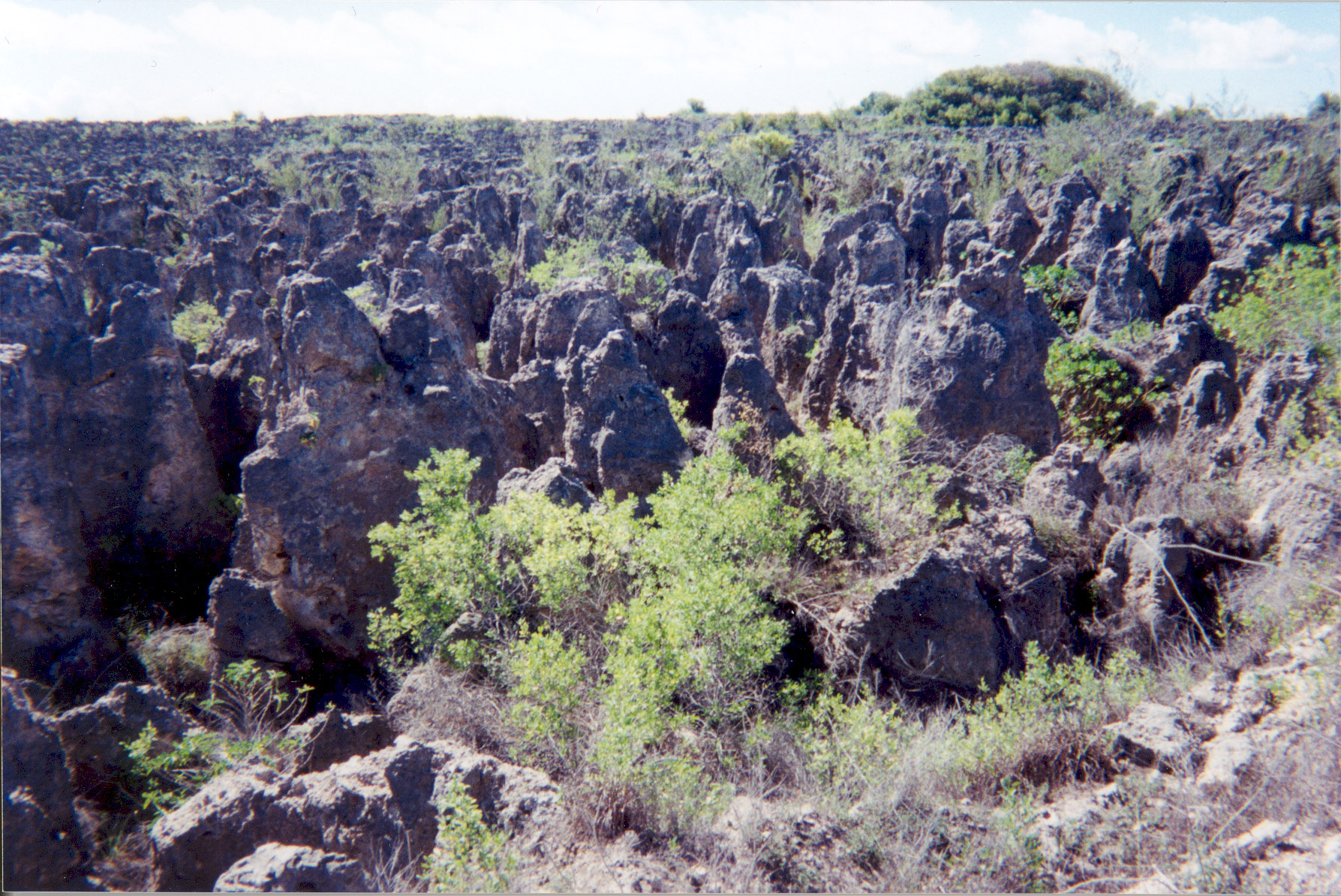
Limestone pinnacles remain after phosphate mining in Nauru.

Ironically, given the industry was started by government research aimed at soil conservation, a number of negative impacts have emerged. The two major criticisms are the run off of fertiliser into streams and waterways which encourages marine plant growth, leading to choking of the waterways and altering the fresh water ecosystem, disadvantaging many fish, (and frustrating anglers). To minimise impact, topdressing is now prohibited within certain distances of water. The second impact is less direct. By enabling sheep to be run profitably on steep hillsides, the topdressing industry stopped reforestation of otherwise uneconomic land, contributing to the erosion it was originally designed to prevent.

The mining of superphosphate from guano deposits on the tiny South Pacific island of Nauru temporarily made the island one of the richest nations in the world on a per capita basis, but removed most of the soil from the island making 80% of it unusable.

== See also ==
- Aerial application
