= Alan Prichard =

Alan Marcus Prichard (15 November 1907 – 2 November 1986) was a pilot for the New Zealand Public Works Department from the late 1930s to mid-1950s. Using a Miles Whitney Straight from 1939 on his own initiative and sometimes forging aircraft log books to conceal his work, Prichard conducted trials of aerial seed sowing and spreading fertilizer which ultimately led to the development of aerial topdressing.

== See also ==
- Aerial topdressing
