= Agricultural aircraft =

Category of aircraft

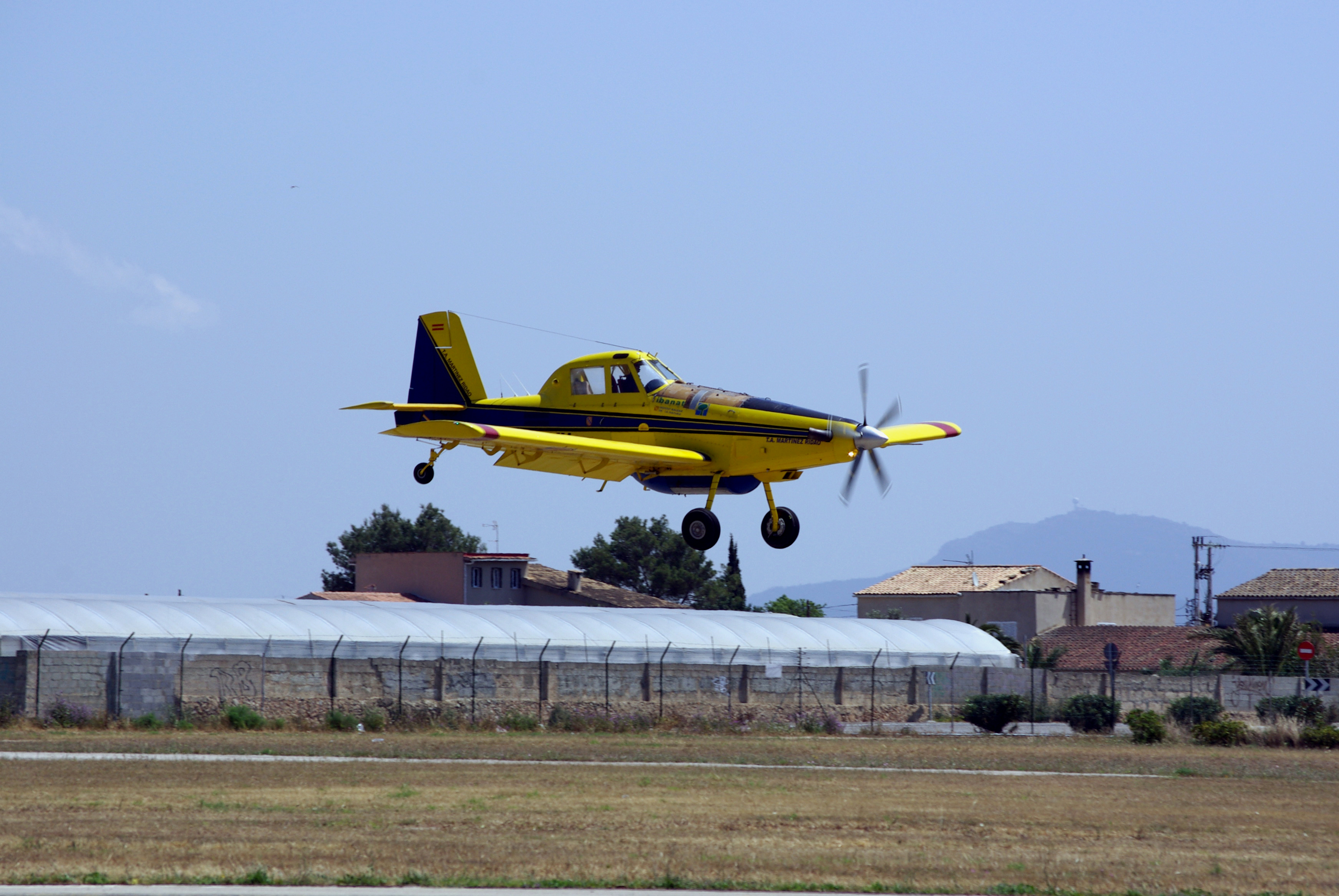
Air Tractor AT-802, with the largest hopper capacity of any commercially available agricultural aircraft.

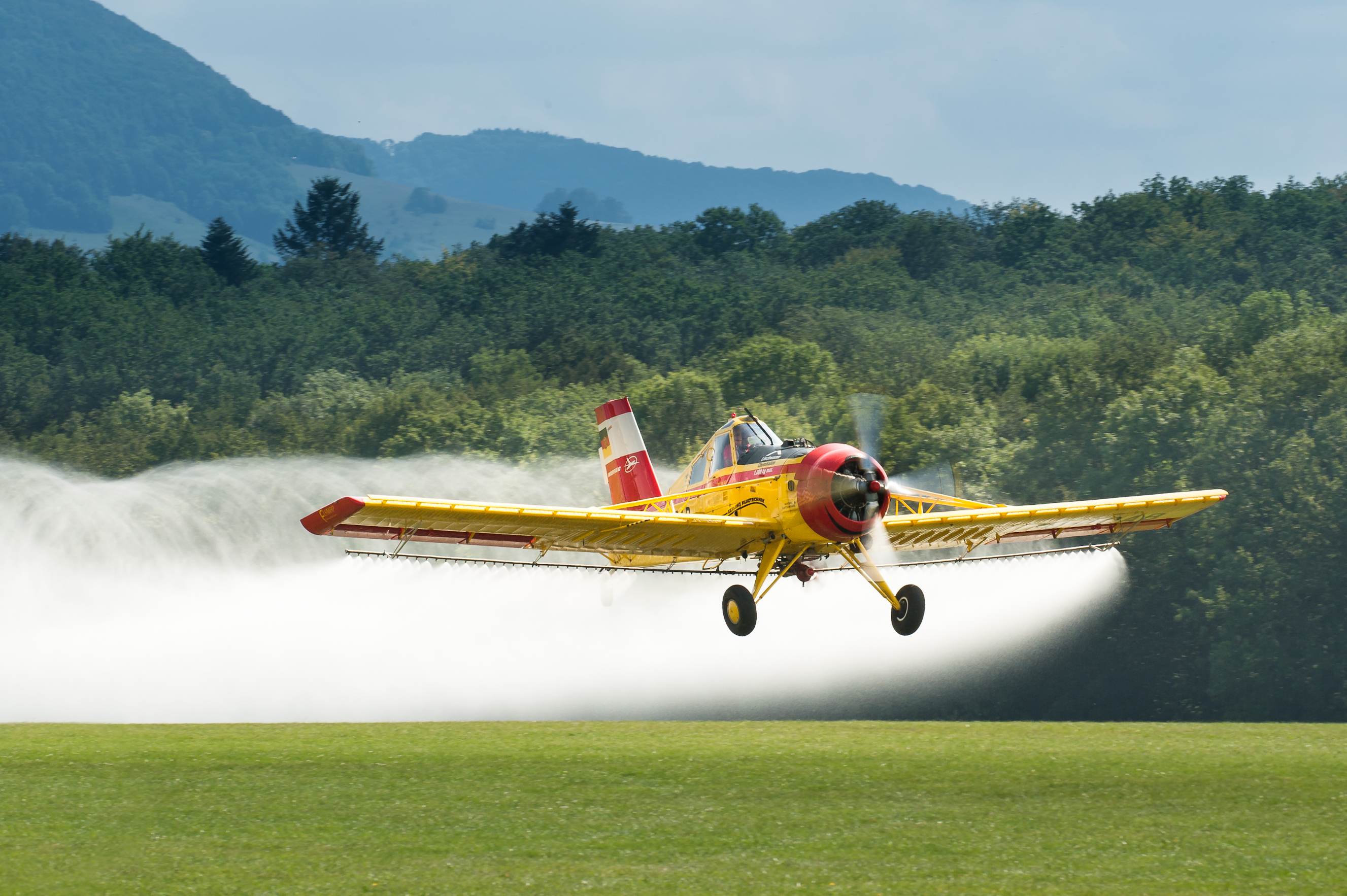
Gehling PZL-106AR Kruk

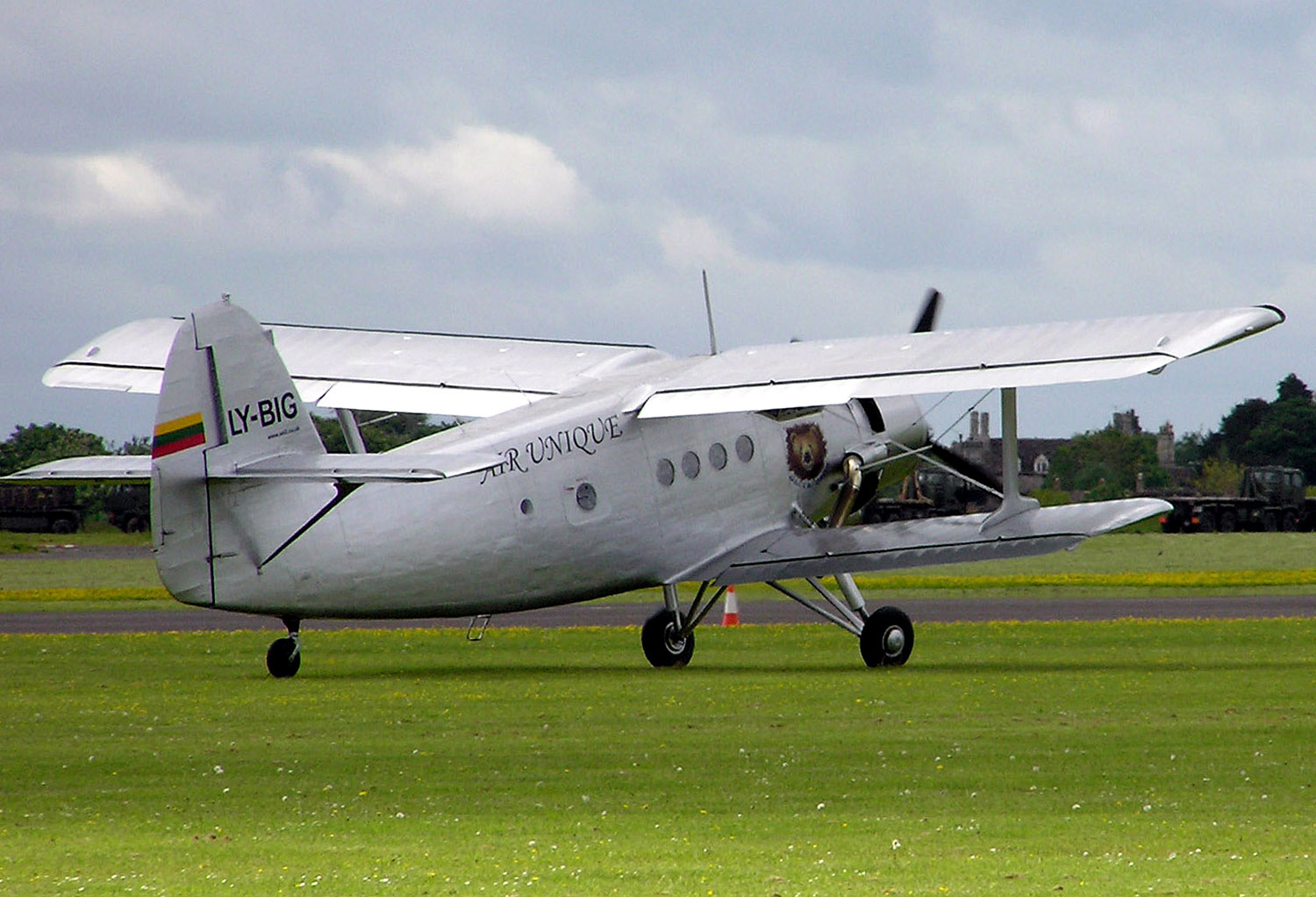
The Antonov An-2 was a mass-produced aircraft. Many were used for agricultural work.

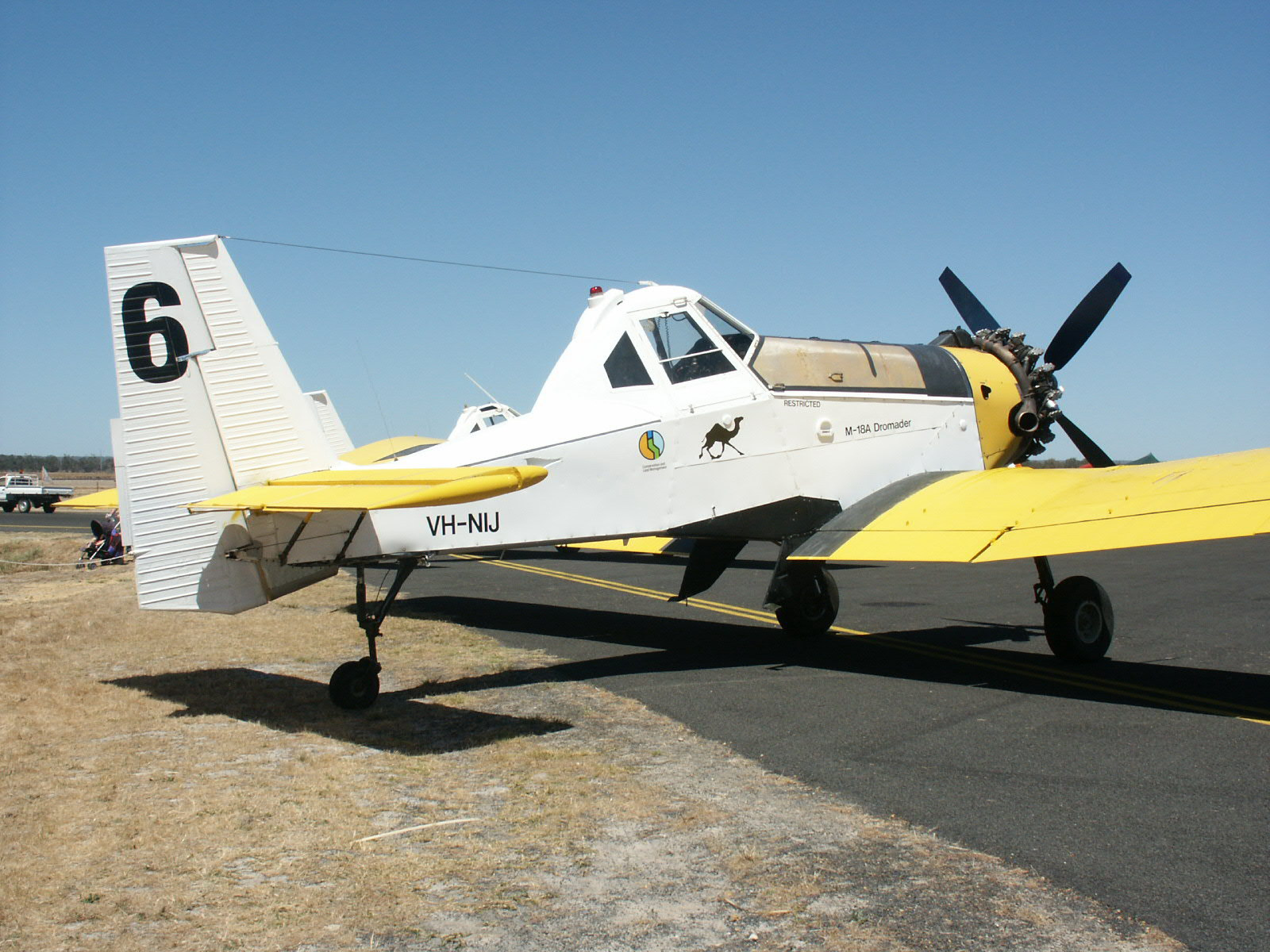
Polish M-18 Dromader used for aerial fire-fighting in Australia.

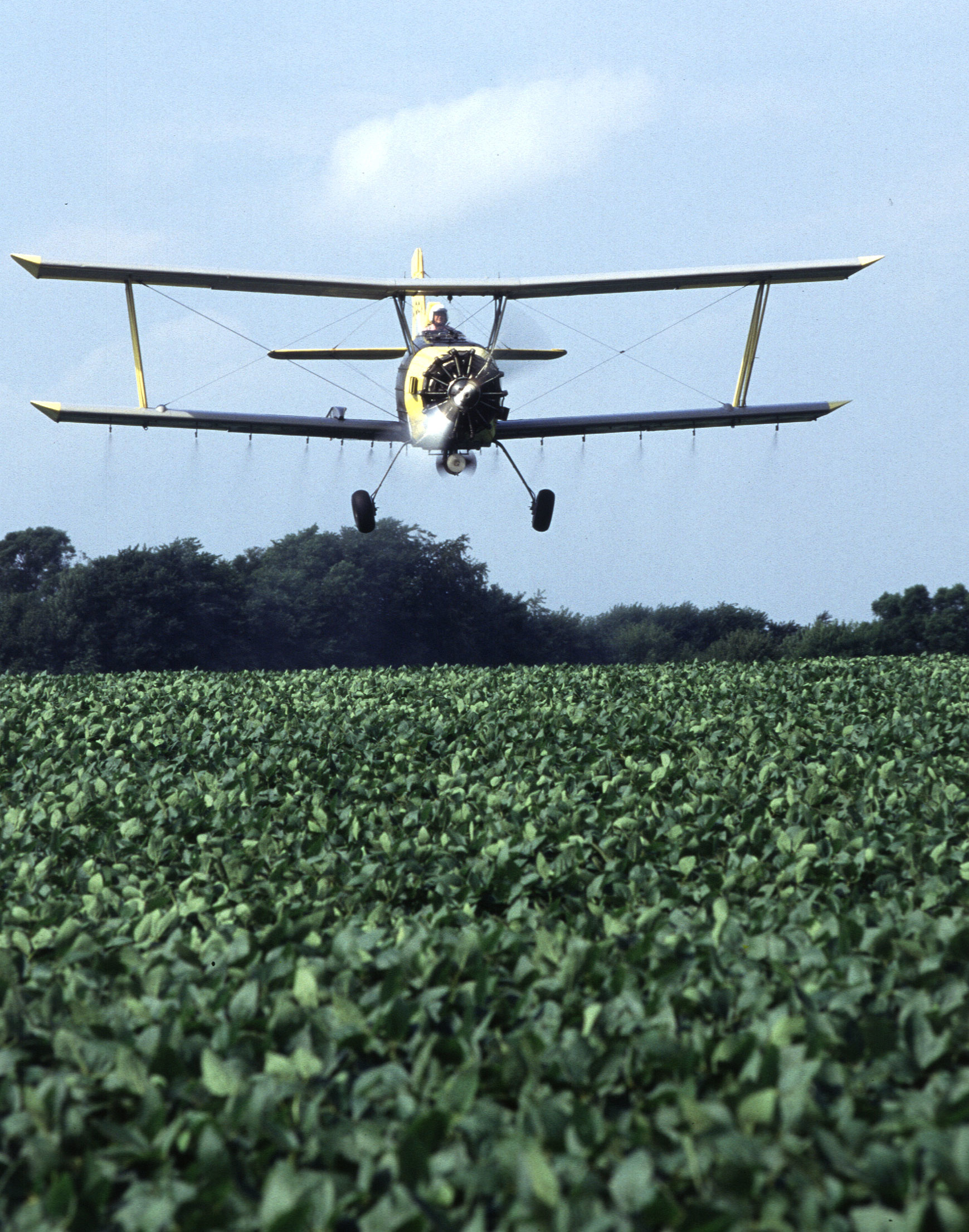
A Grumman Ag Cat applies a low-insecticide bait on a soybean field.

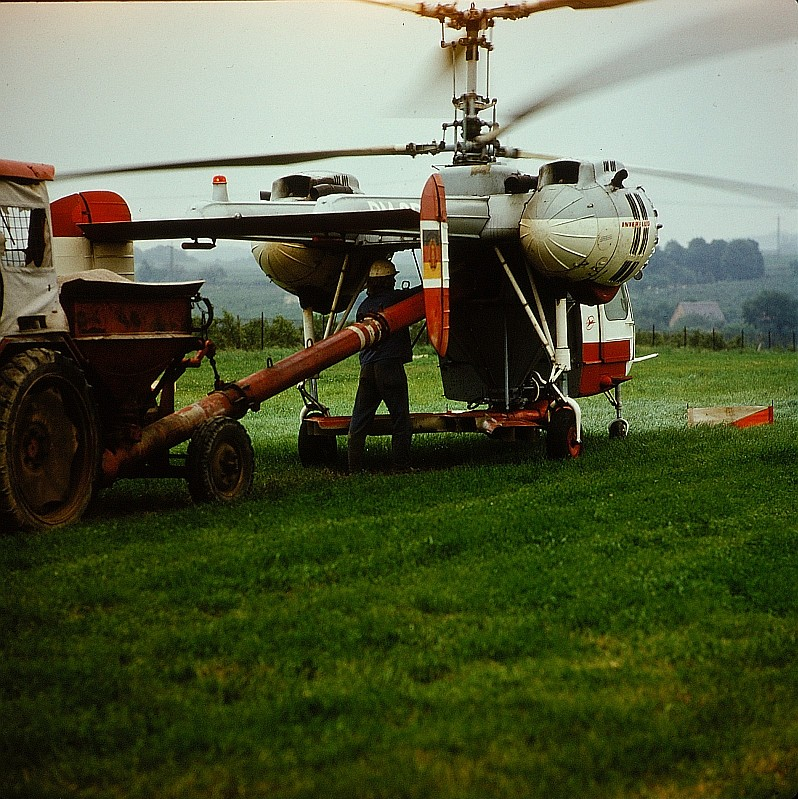
Ka-26 helicopter. Refueling fertilizers through the auger.

An agricultural aircraft is an aircraft that has been built or converted for agricultural use – usually aerial application of pesticides (crop dusting) or fertilizer (aerial topdressing); in these roles, they are referred to as "crop dusters" or "top dressers". Agricultural aircraft are also used for hydroseeding.

The most common agricultural aircraft are fixed-wing – such as the Air Tractor, Cessna Ag-wagon, Gippsland GA200, Grumman Ag Cat, PZL-106 KRUK, M-18 Dromader, PAC Fletcher, Piper PA-36 Pawnee Brave, Embraer EMB 202 Ipanema, and Rockwell Thrush Commander – but helicopters are also used.

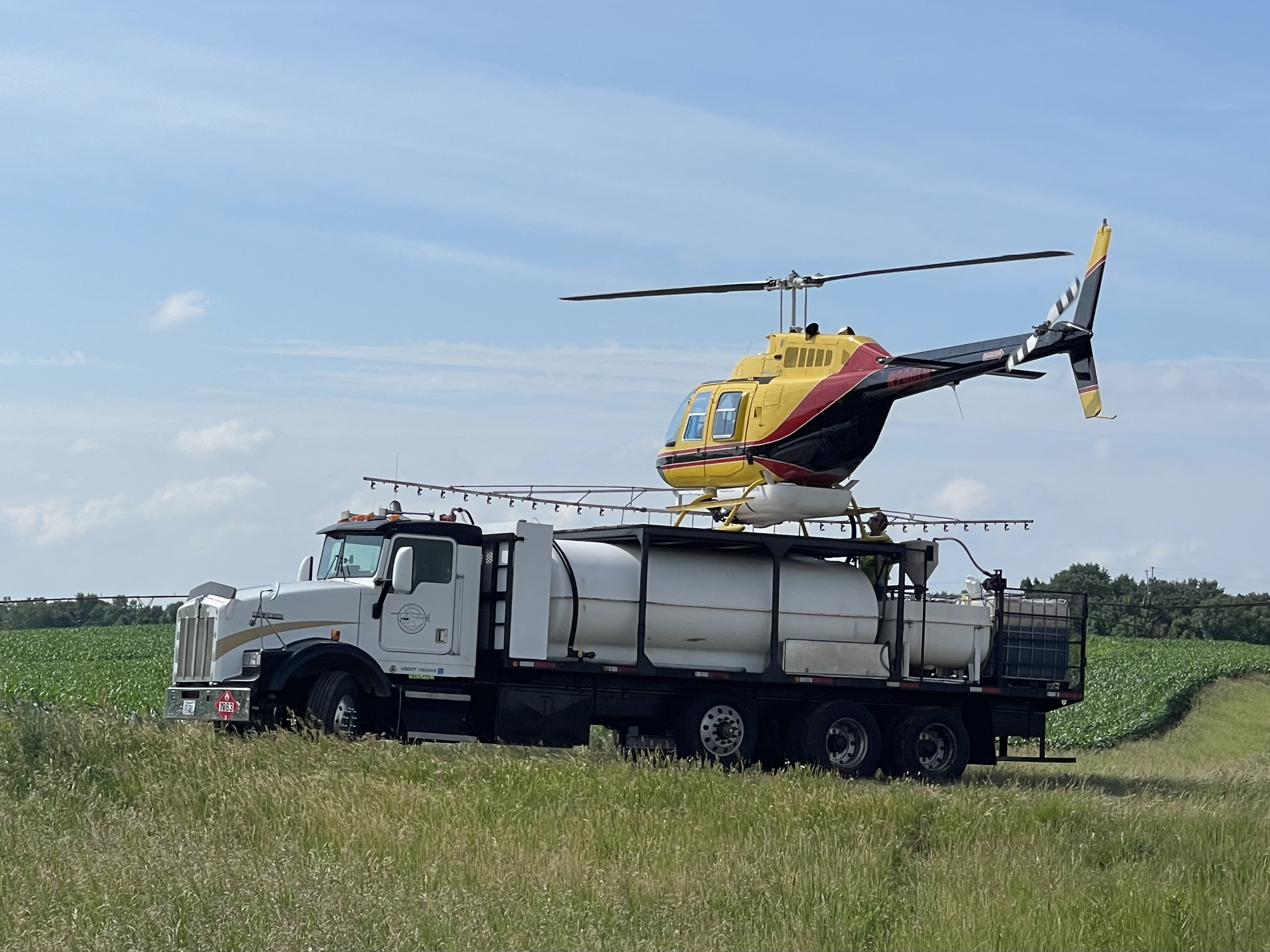
Crop spraying helicopter on a landing pad atop its refueling truck

Generally, agricultural aircraft have piston or turboprop engines. The only known exception is the Polish PZL M-15 Belphegor which has a jet engine.

== Early use of aircraft in agriculture ==
Crop dusting with insecticides began in the 1920s in the United States. The first widely used agricultural aircraft were converted war-surplus biplanes, such as the De Havilland Tiger Moth and Stearman. After more effective insecticides and fungicides were developed in the 1940s, and aerial topdressing was developed by government research in New Zealand, purpose-built agricultural fixed-wing aircraft became common.

== Designs ==
In the US and Europe, agricultural aircraft are typically small, simple, and rugged. Most have spraying systems attached to the trailing edges of their wings, and pumps are usually driven by wind turbines. In places where farms are larger, such as New Zealand, Australia, the former Warsaw Pact nations, and parts of the developing world, larger and more powerful aircraft have been used, including turboprop powered aircraft such as the PAC Cresco, twin engined types such as the Lockheed Lodestar and the WSK-Mielec M-15 Belphegor – a turbofan-powered biplane. All tend to be of simple, rugged STOL design. Sometimes a ram air turbine is used as an auxiliary power source for the pumping machinery instead of taking power directly from the engine (because this can be installed without any modifications of the airplane's mechanical systems). In places where dedicated use as an agricultural aircraft is uneconomic, utility types such as the Antonov An-2 biplane and De Havilland Canada DHC-2 Beaver have been used.

In the case of helicopters, tanks are placed on or outside the body of the aircraft, while a spray rig, extending outward to the sides, is attached well below the main rotor blades. Hydroseeding is often done by helicopters using tanks and drop systems much like those used for aerial firefighting.

== Techniques ==
To reduce drift of the sprayed materials, agricultural pilots attempt to fly just above the crops being treated. Fields are often surrounded by obstacles such as trees, telephone lines, and farm buildings. Purpose-built agricultural airplanes have strengthened cockpits to protect the pilot if an accident occurs.

== Conflicting views on aerial spraying ==
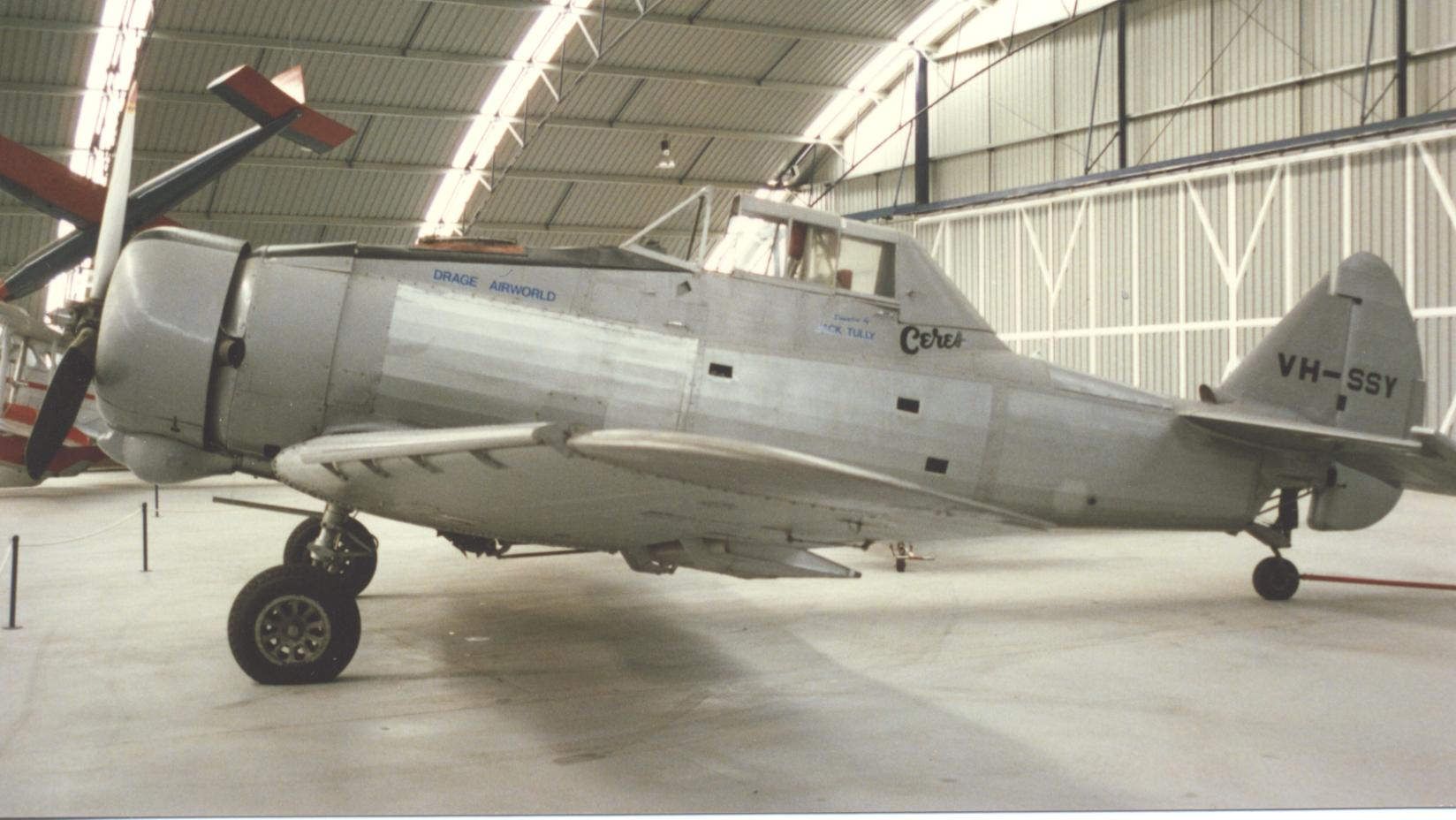
Australian Commonwealth CA-28 Ceres at Wangaratta Airport in 1988. The CA-28 was a crop spraying aircraft of the 1950s.

Aerial spraying has been controversial since the 1960s, due to environmental concerns about pesticide drift (raised for example by Rachel Carson's book Silent Spring). It is now often subject to restrictions, for example spraying pesticide is generally banned in Sweden, although exceptions can be made such as for an area plagued by mosquitoes during summer. The aerial spread of fertilizer has also raised concerns, for example in New Zealand fertilizer entering streams has been found to disproportionately promote growth of species that are more able to exploit the nutrients, in a process known as eutrophication, which has led to restrictions on topdressing near waterways.

== See also ==
- Agricultural drone
- Aerial topdressing
- Aerial firefighting
- Aerial application
- Pesticide drift

Notable cropduster pilots

- Alan Prichard

Manufacturers

- Air Tractor
- Embraer
- Pacific Aerospace
- PZL Mielec
- Thrush Aircraft
