= Weatherly =

Weatherly or Weatherley may refer to:

== Weatherly ==
- Weatherly, Pennsylvania, a borough in Carbon County, Pennsylvania, USA
  - Weatherly Area School District, a public school district in Carbon County, Pennsylvania, USA
- Weatherly, in sailing, (of a boat), able to sail close to the wind without drifting leeward
- Weatherly Building, a 12-story office building in Portland, Oregon built in 1926 by George Warren Weatherly
- Weatherly (yacht), designed by Philip Rhodes, which successfully defended the America's Cup in 1962.
- Weatherly 201, Weatherly 620, American agricultural monoplanes (since 1960) designed and built by John Weatherly and the Weatherly Aviation Company

== Weatherly as a surname ==
- Amelia Heinle (also used married name: "Amelia Weatherly") (born 1973), American actress known for daytime soap operas
- Andrew Earl Weatherly (1895–1981), a philatelist of North Carolina
- Bones Weatherly (1928–2004), American football player
- Clay Weatherly (1910–1935) American racecar driver
- Frederic Weatherly (1848–1929), English lawyer, author, songwriter and radio entertainer
- Jim Weatherly (1943–2021), American singer-songwriter
- Jim Weatherly (American football) (born 1952)
- Joe Weatherly (1922–1964), American NASCAR championship driver
- L.A. Weatherly or Lee Weatherly (born 1967), American author
- Mark Weatherly (born 1958), English retired football (soccer) player
- Michael Weatherly (born 1968), American actor
- Richard Weatherly (born 1947), Australian artist
- Roy Weatherly (1915–1991) an American professional baseball player
- Shawn Weatherly (born 1959), American beauty queen and entertainer
- Stephen Weatherly (born 1994), American football player
- Tenant Weatherly (1851–?), American state legislator
- Thomas E. Weatherly Jr. (1942–2014), American poet
- Ulysses G. Weatherly, American sociologist

== Weatherley ==
- David Weatherley (disambiguation), multiple people
- Graeme Weatherley (born 1955), Australian rules footballer
- Joe Weatherley (born 1997), English cricketer
- Ken Weatherley (born 1947), British tennis player
- Laurence Weatherley, British-American engineer
- Mike Weatherley (1957–2021), British Conservative politician and Member of Parliament for Hove, elected in the 2010 general election
- Paul Weatherley (1917–2001), British botanist
- Peter Weatherley (1930–2015), British film editor
- Steve Weatherley (born 1957), English former motorcycle speedway rider

== See also ==
- Weston under Wetherley
