= Platt-LePage Aircraft Company =

American aircraft manufacturer

- Industry: Aircraft manufacture
- Founded: 1938
- Founder: Wynn Laurence LePage; Haviland H. Platt
- Defunct: 1947
- Fate: Dissolved
- Headquarters: Eddystone, Pennsylvania, United States of America
- Key people: R. Allen Price; Elliot Daland; Frank Piasecki; Donald Beatty
- Products: XR-1

The Platt-LePage Aircraft Company was a manufacturer of aircraft for the armed forces of the United States of America. Based in Eddystone, Pennsylvania, the company produced the first helicopter to be officially acquired by the United States Army Air Forces.

== Establishment ==
Wynn Laurence LePage, a British aeronautical engineer living in Pennsylvania, co-founded the Platt-LePage Aircraft Company in partnership with Haviland Hull Platt, the company's intended purpose being the manufacture of helicopters. LePage, impressed by the performance of the German Focke-Wulf Fa 61, acquired the manufacturing rights to the aircraft.

Two early helicopter prototypes developed by the company failed to meet with any success; however in 1940, under the terms of the Dorsey-Logan Act, Platt-Lepage was declared the winner of a competition to supply the Army with its first helicopter.

== First Army helicopter ==
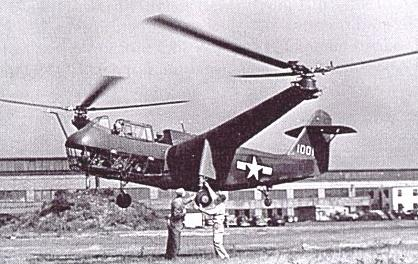
Platt-Lepage XR-1

Having employed designer Grover Loening as a consultant and helicopter enthusiast Frank Piasecki employed as a junior engineer, Platt-Lepage set to work developing the helicopter, using a similar rotor arrangement to that of the Fa 61. The aircraft, designated XR-1, flew three months behind schedule in 1941.

The XR-1 suffered from significant teething troubles, including control difficulties, vibration, and resonance issues, and financial difficulties at Platt-LePage caused significant delays in resolving the aircraft's problems. Despite this, the USAAF still believed the XR-1 would prove successful, however the improved XR-1A, flying for the first time in 1943, proved little better than its predecessor, and was damaged in an accident in early 1944.

With Piasecki having left the company, the XR-1's flight testing dragged on through 1944. The Army Air Forces, spurred by Congressional accusations of favoritism towards Vought-Sikorsky, ordered seven YR-1A service-test helicopters. Despite this, Sikorsky's R-4 was proving far superior to the Platt-LePage aircraft, having successfully passed its flight trials and already entering operational service with the Army. Therefore, in early 1945 the Army elected to cancel its contracts with Platt-LePage.

== Disestablishment ==
The PL-16 tiltrotor concept

The repaired XR-1A was purchased by Helicopter Air Transport, which intended to operate it for commercial purposes as part of a fleet of 40 helicopters. The company had also developed a number of other concepts for helicopters, including the PL-11, an improved civilian version of the XR-1A; the PL-12, a four-passenger variant of the PL-11; and the PL-14, a twin-rotor helicopter based on a Grumman Widgeon fuselage. In addition, a design for a tiltrotor airliner was developed by the company.

However, the cancellation of the company's Army contracts had removed Platt-LePage's primary source of income, and without sufficient funds to continue operating, the company closed its doors on January 13, 1947. McDonnell Aircraft, which had acquired part of the company in 1942, and a larger share in 1944, purchased the rights to the remainder of the company's intellectual property, including the design for the PL-9, a twin-engine helicopter that McDonnell would develop into the XHJD Whirlaway.
