= Donald Beatty =

American aviator, explorer, and inventor

Donald Croom Beatty (April 11, 1900 – July 12, 1980) was an American aviator, explorer, and inventor.

Beatty was the son of Isaac Beatty Jr and Hughie Duffee Beatty of Birmingham, Alabama (United States). He began his flying career as a teenager by soloing a small plane he constructed himself with a motorcycle engine at his grandfather's farm near Tarrant on June 16, 1916. The flight ended with a crash landing. Not long afterward he designed and constructed a hand-powered submarine which he sank in Homewood's Edgewood Lake.

After a year at Marion Military Institute, Beatty got permission from his father to enlist in the United States Navy at age 17. He was sent to the Navy Radio School set up at Harvard University. In 1919 the United Fruit Company hired him to construct and install wireless (radio) telegraphy equipment along its steamer routes in Asia. He reportedly constructed the first voice radio station in mainland China during that engagement.

== Alabama radio and aviation ==
After returning to Alabama, Beatty joined James Meissner and a few fellow aviators to form the "Birmingham Flying Club" in 1919 at their own "Roberts Field". The unit was recognized as the 135th Observation Squadron, the state's first Air National Guard unit, on January 21, 1922. Beatty qualified as a military pilot at Maxwell Field in Montgomery and, in 1924, was commissioned as a 1st Lieutenant in the United States Army Air Corps.

In 1921 Beatty constructed Alabama's first experimental voice radio station, then called WIAG on the second floor of the Matthews Electric building. He used the station to broadcast weather reports to the few receiver-equipped pilots in range and had his flying student and girlfriend Mary Alice Gatling play the piano in the broadcast booth (presumably the first live broadcast of music in Alabama). An improved radio circuit Beatty developed for the station was the subject of his first U. S. patent, awarded in 1922.

== South American expedition ==
In 1929, Beatty recruited investors from Birmingham and New Orleans, Louisiana to back a trade delegation by air to South America. He would serve as director and pilot with Robb C. Oertel as co-pilot, Leslie Walker as navigator, and Martel Brett, a Birmingham Age-Herald reporter, as historian. Hopes for the flight, which were widely publicized, were dashed by the Wall Street crash of 1929.

In 1931 Beatty re-launched his ambitions for an expedition to South America, adding the enticement of exploration of the interior of the continent to his plans. He secured the cooperation of Major Leslie Barbrook of the National Geographic Society and William Stirling, chief ethnologist for the Smithsonian Institution, and approached J. P. Morgan for financing. With a $25,000 check in hand he and his wife attended the christening of the "Simon Bolivar" amphibious airplane at Roosevelt Field in New York on October 18 of that year.

Months of privation in the jungle were punctuated by careful movements across tribal boundaries into Ecuador. The group made the first photographs and motion-picture recordings of the native Jivaro (Shuar) people, known then primarily as head-hunters. A miscommunication about the team's desire to record the shrinking of a Howler monkey head resulted, to their horror, in them witnessing the process performed on the head of their former packbearer, Sunga. Beatty occasionally used his radio equipment and Stirling used a kit of chemical substances to awe and frighten the natives. Eventually the expedition boarded rafts for the long journey down the Amazon River.

In addition to their photographs, the expedition collected numerous artifacts and live animal specimens. A "tiger cub" (jaguar) sent by Beatty to his 6-year-old daughter was soon turned over to the Birmingham Zoo at Avondale Park, where it was found to be particularly uncooperative with the public. The success of the expedition led to Beatty's induction as a "fellow" to both The Explorers Club of New York and the Royal Geographical Society.

== Panagra ==
Pan American-Grace Airways (Panagra) recruited Beatty to lead the search for a downed plane in the Andes. He piloted a Fairchild 71 monoplane wearing an early pressurized flight suit for his hundreds of search flights over the mountains. The site was buried in snow throughout Beatty's search and finally found by prospecting natives after an unusually warm summer.

Nevertheless, his experience and the geographical and detailed flight information he recorded allowed Beatty to develop air routes and safety practices for commercial flights across the mountains. He implemented the first system for air-to-ground voice communications and his recommendation for pilots to report their grid-square location at 5-minute intervals was widely adopted and is credited with saving many lives. Another recommendation to vary routes seasonally to avoid dangerous climate conditions was also instrumental in making commercial flights viable in mountainous regions.

In 1933, while Beatty was piloting a Panagra passenger flight from Los Cerillos airfield in Santiago, Chile through the Uspallata Pass, a sudden strong wind (Clear-air turbulence) carried the craft above 26,000 feet, setting an altitude record for a passenger flight in an unpressurized cabin. The passengers and crew used breathing tubes connected to oxygen tanks, but when the incident prolonged the flight, the oxygen was reserved for the crew only, causing the passengers to lose consciousness. The pass is sometimes called "Beatty Pass" in recognition of his development of the route.

In 1935 Beatty, piloting a Sikorsky S-43, set a speed record for a flight between the continental United States and the Panama Canal Zone.

In 1938 Beatty was forced to land a Panagra amphibious flight in the Pacific Ocean after his equipment was damaged by a lightning strike. He landed successfully and dropped anchor. After receiving fuel and supplies from another seaplane, he successfully took off in the rough seas and completed the flight.

== CAA and Consairway ==
In 1939 Beatty returned to the United States as the appointed Senior Air Safety Investigator for the Civil Aeronautics Authority. He reported for duty in Santa Monica, California on July 1, 1939, and made reports on all non-military aviation incidents in the western states.

Before World War II, Beatty accepted an offer from Consolidated Aircraft of San Diego, California to direct its flight testing and delivery operations worldwide. The program he set up in 1941 between California and Australia was designated "Consairway" and, using precautionary protocols Beatty initiated, the civilian-crewed program suffered no losses in its hundreds of flights across enemy-controlled seaways. Consairway rapidly expanded into a major ferrying operation which delivered flight crews and material to combat zones. Beatty invented the use of barometric readings to adjust flight paths en route over the Pacific, now a standard fuel conservation practice. His training of pilots from experience in mountainous terrain proved especially critical in the Pacific theater as air routes over the Himalayas were the only means of getting freight into China.

Meanwhile, Beatty himself relocated to Elizabeth City, North Carolina to oversee Consolidated's modification of aircraft for leasing to European powers. In order to overcome a bottleneck in outfitting the Royal Air Force he established a Convair flight crew training facility in Bermuda.

In 1944 Beatty left to work for the Platt-LePage Aircraft Company in Eddystone, Pennsylvania. He contributed to the top-secret development of the XR-1 dual-rotor helicopter, the first helicopter used by the United States Air Force.

== 1940s inventions ==
As his involvement at Platt-LePage waned, Beatty pursued numerous patents for new inventions, primarily relating to electronic circuits for communications. The first invention to go to market, however, was a type of highway signage that would indicate progress along the route and the expected travel time to the next destination city. His "Minute Maps", as they were called, were put into service on several routes in Alabama and the mid-Atlantic.

Beatty was awarded the first patent for a circuit to allow telephone callers to leave messages when calls were unanswered. Utilizing a wire recorder, the device was marketed as the "Tele-Mat" telecorder by the Pentron Corporation and sold for $250; located in the Atwell Building (designed by Alfred S. Alschuler) at 221 E. Cullerton St., Chicago, Illinois, the Pentron Corp. was one of the largest producers of audio tape recorders carried under the brand names of such firms as Montgomery Ward, Sears, Emerson Radio, Westinghouse, and Motorola. Beatty's other telephone-related innovations included the first automated dialer and a hands-free telephone set.

Beatty is also credited as one of the pioneers of barometric route selecting, a more efficient method of air navigation for long, over-water flights.

== Hayes and GAALT ==
Beatty signed on as the first employee of Birmingham's Hayes Aircraft Corporation in 1951 and was made head of the company's research and development in electronic equipment in 1958. While there he patented the "Gain-Adjusting Audio Level Terminator" (GAALT), a solid-state amplifier used to improve the Signal-to-noise ratio in electronic communications. The device was widely adopted, even appearing on the Kennedy Presidential Train. It was used by NASA for the Echo 1 communications satellite launched on August 12, 1960, and has found its way into a wide range of orbiting and terrestrial signaling devices ever since. The Alabama Power Company even adapted the technology to allow for sending company signals through its power lines, eliminating the need for separate telephone communications (a parallel to its earlier adoption of Beatty's radio station.)

== Later life ==
Beatty retired to his home in Mountain Brook, where he was surrounded by his Amazonian artifacts and other mementos of aviation and exploring. The OX-5 Aviation Pioneers named him their "Man of the Year" in 1973. Architect Fritz Woehle was given Beatty's permission to reconstruct the decor of his living room as part of an exhibit at the Birmingham Festival of Arts' 1975 Salute to Brazil. In 1978 he and his wife agreed to donate their nearly 300 Jivaro artifacts to the Smithsonian Institution, which previously had only a small collection of Stirling's souvenirs from the 1930s expedition. The donation led to the couple being awarded the James Smithson Medal, the Smithsonian's highest honor.

Beatty suffered a stroke on his 80th birthday and died in Birmingham three months later, on July 12, 1980. He was buried at Elmwood Cemetery.

Beatty was inducted into the Alabama Aviation Hall of Fame at the Southern Museum of Flight in 1982 and the Alabama Men's Hall of Fame in 1992.

== Patents ==
- Beatty, Donald C. (September 17, 1945) "Road sign with location indicator." Patent No. 2,492,679 granted December 27, 1949
- Beatty, Donald C. (July 23, 1948) "Apparatus for delivering and receiving telephone messages." Patent No. 2,525,763 granted October 17, 1950
- Beatty, Donald C. (March 4, 1949) "Apparatus for delivering and receiving telephone messages." Patent No. 2,539,565 granted January 30, 1951
- Beatty, Donald C. (February 9, 1954) "Sound amplifying apparatus for telephone circuits." Patent No. 2,786,099 granted March 19, 1957
- Beatty, Donald C. (January 27, 1956) "Sound amplifying apparatus for telephone and like circuits." Patent No. 2,826,636 granted March 11, 1958
- Beatty, Donald C. (June 10, 1958) "Automatic, circuit-condition-change-responsive, on-off control for loudspeaking telephone and the like." Patent No. 3,041,411 granted June 26, 1962
- Beatty, Donald C. (August 2, 1961) "Gain-adjusting audio level terminator." Patent No. 3,182,137 granted May 4, 1965
- Beatty, Donald C. (November 6, 1963) "Self-regulating compression amplifier." Patent No. 3,275,946 granted September 27, 1966
