= Sikorsky H-5 =

1943 multi-role helicopter by Sikorsky

R-5 / H-5
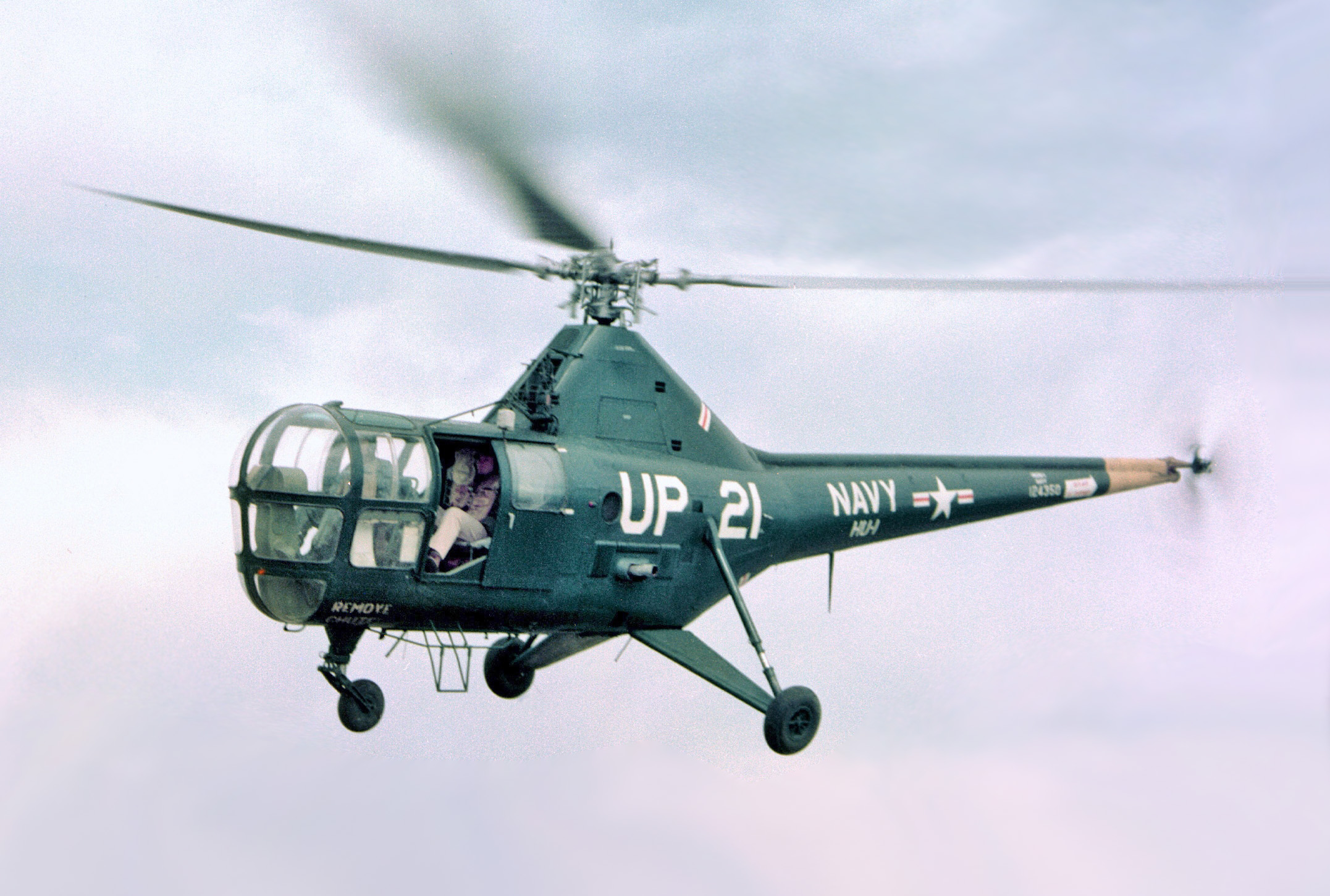
- A Sikorsky HO3S-1 of Helicopter Utility Squadron 1 (HU-1) takes off from USS New Jersey

General information
- Type: Helicopter
- Manufacturer: Sikorsky Aircraft
- Primary users: United States Air Force: United States Navy; United States Coast Guard; United States Marine Corps
- Number built: over 300

History
- Manufactured: 1944–1951
- Introduction date: February 1945
- First flight: 18 August 1943
- Retired: 1957
- Developed from: Sikorsky R-4
- Variant: Westland WS-51 Dragonfly

The Sikorsky H-5 (initially designated R-5 (Note: R-5 until 1948 when use of R for "rotary-wing" was replaced by H for "helicopter" under the designation system) and also known by company designations S-48, S-51 and VS-327) is a helicopter built by Sikorsky Aircraft Corporation.

It was used by the United States Air Force, and its predecessor, the United States Army Air Forces, as well as the United States Navy and United States Coast Guard (with the designations HO2S and HO3S). It was also used by the United States Post Office Department. The civilian version, under the designation S-51, was the first helicopter to be operated commercially, commencing in 1946.

In December 1946, an agreement was signed between the British company Westland Aircraft and Sikorsky to produce a British version of the H-5, to be manufactured under license in Britain as the Westland-Sikorsky WS-51 Dragonfly. By the time production ceased in 1951, more than 300 examples of all types of the H-5 had been built.

== Design and development ==
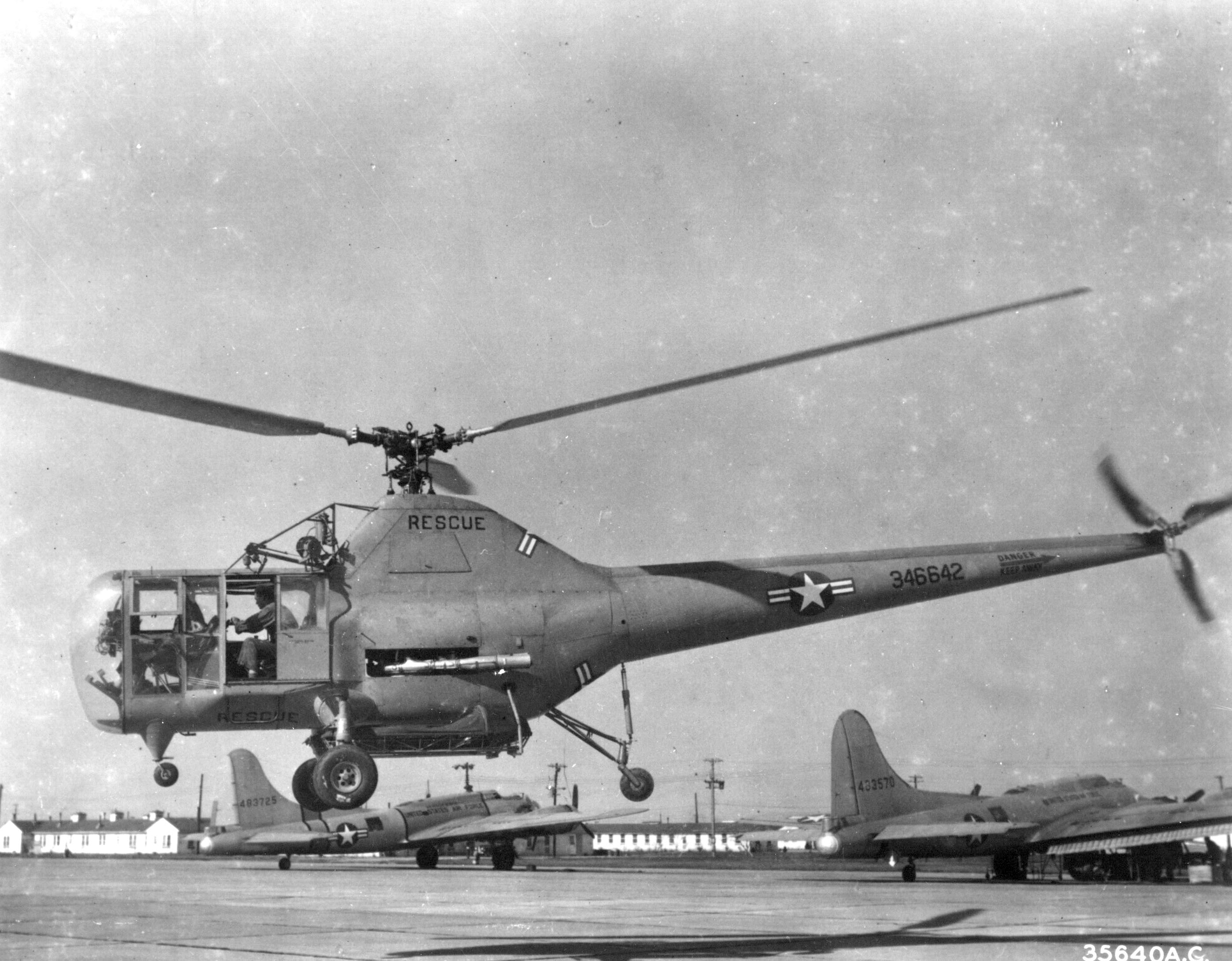
U.S. Air Force H-5D takes off post-World War II.

The H-5 was originally built by Sikorsky as its model S-48, designated as the R-5 by the United States Army Air Forces. It was designed to provide a helicopter having greater useful load, endurance, speed, and service ceiling than the Sikorsky R-4. The R-5 differed from the R-4 by having an increased rotor diameter and a new, longer fuselage for two persons in tandem, though it retained the R-4's tailwheel-type landing gear. Larger than the R-4 or the later R-6, the R-5 was fitted with a more powerful Wasp Junior 450-hp radial engine, and quickly proved itself the most successful of the three types. The first XR-5 of four ordered made its initial flight on 18 August 1943. In March 1944, the Army Air Forces ordered 26 YR-5As for service testing, and in February 1945, the first YR-5A was delivered. This order was followed by a production contract for 100 R-5s, outfitted with racks for two litters (stretchers), but only 34 were actually delivered. Of these, fourteen were the R-5A, basically identical with the YR-5A. The remaining twenty were built as the three-place R-5D, which had a widened cabin with a two-place rear bench seat and a small nosewheel added to the landing gear, and could be optionally fitted with a rescue hoist and an auxiliary external fuel tank. Five of the service-test YR-5As were later converted into dual-control YR-5Es. The United States Navy evaluated three R-5As as the HO2S-1.

Sikorsky soon developed a modified version of the R-5, the S-51, featuring a greater rotor diameter, greater carrying capacity and gross weight, and a redesigned tricycle landing gear configuration; this first flew on 16 February 1946. With room for three passengers plus pilot, the S-51 was initially intended to appeal to civilian as well as military operators, and was the first helicopter to be sold to a commercial user. Eleven S-51s were ordered by the USAF and designated the R-5F, while 92 went to the Navy as the HO3S-1, commonly referred to as the 'Horse'.

In Britain, Westland Aircraft began production in 1946 of the Westland-Sikorsky S-51 Dragonfly for the Royal Navy and the Royal Air Force, all of which were powered by a 500 hp Alvis Leonides engine. This gave an improved top speed of 103 mph and a service ceiling of 14,000 ft. In total, 133 Westland-Sikorsky Dragonfly helicopters were built. A considerably modified version was also developed by Westland as the Westland Widgeon, but the type was never adopted for service.

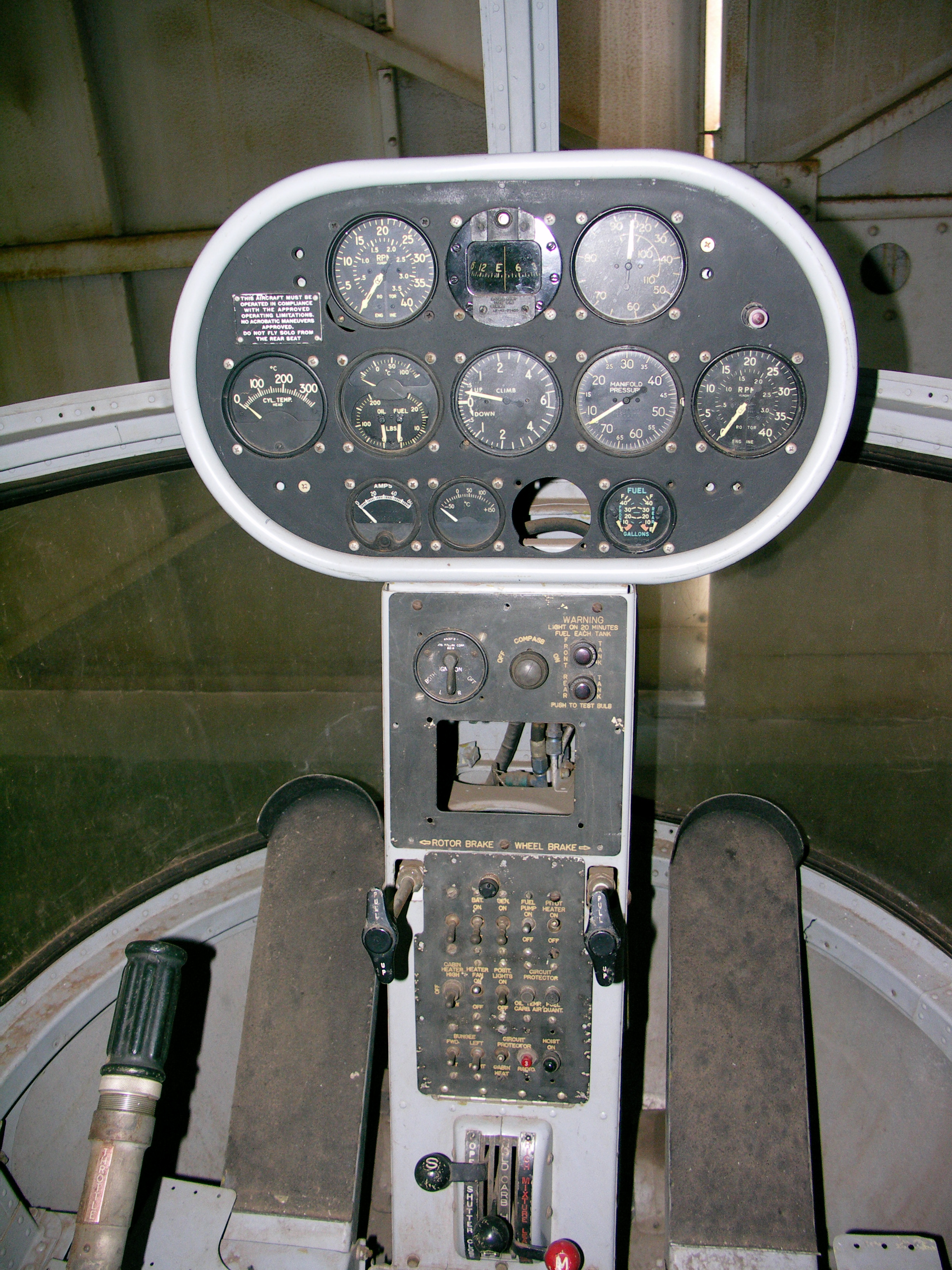
Instrument panel of the S-51

The U.S. Navy ordered four S-51s "off-the-shelf" from Sikorsky in late 1946 for use in the Antarctic and Operation Highjump, placing them into naval inventory as the HO3S-1. Carried aboard the seaplane tender USS Pine Island, on Christmas Day 1946 an HO3S-1 of VX-3 piloted by Lieutenant Commander Walter M. Sessums became the first helicopter to fly in the Antarctic. Having proved its capabilities, the initial naval HO3S-1 order was followed by subsequent purchases of an additional 42 aircraft in 1948. The Navy equipped several warship classes with HO3S-1 utility helos, including aircraft carriers, seaplane tenders, icebreakers, Des Moines-class cruisers, and Iowa-class battleships. By February 1948, the Marine Corps had equipped HMX-1, its first regular Marine Helicopter Transport Squadron, with six HO3S-1 aircraft. With a passenger load of only three lightly dressed persons, the HO3S-1s were primarily operated in the utility role by the marines; for the transport role, an additional nine tandem-rotor Piasecki-built HRP-1 helicopters were later added to the squadron. Eventually, the U.S. Navy would acquire a total of 88 HO3S-1 (S-51) helicopters.

Thirty-nine additional specialized rescue helicopters were built, as the H-5G, in 1948, while 16 were fitted with pontoons as the H-5H amphibian in 1949.

Several H-5Hs were converted in 1949 to a unique medical-evacuation role, with casualty stretchers loaded sideways through blister-hatches on the side of the fuselage. The back stretcher station was located just forward of the tail boom and the main stretcher station was located behind the crew cabin. The forward stretcher station could accommodate two casualties, who were accessible to the medic in flight, while the back stretcher station handled only one, not accessible to the medic during the flight. Very little information is known about the operational use of this modification by the USAF, this being abandoned shortly after tests in 1950.

The R-5 had been designated under the United States Army Air Forces system, a series starting with R-1 and proceeding up to about R-16. In 1947 with the start of the United States Air Force, there was a new system, and many aircraft, but not all, were redesignated. The R-5 became the H-5. The United States Army broke off with its own designation system in the 1950s, resulting in new designations for its helicopter projects. In 1962 under the new tri-service system (see 1962 United States Tri-Service aircraft designation system), many navy and army aircraft were given the low numbers. Under the 1962 system, the low H numbers were given to new aircraft. For example, H-5 was given to the OH-5, a prototype design which never entered Army service.

== Operational history ==
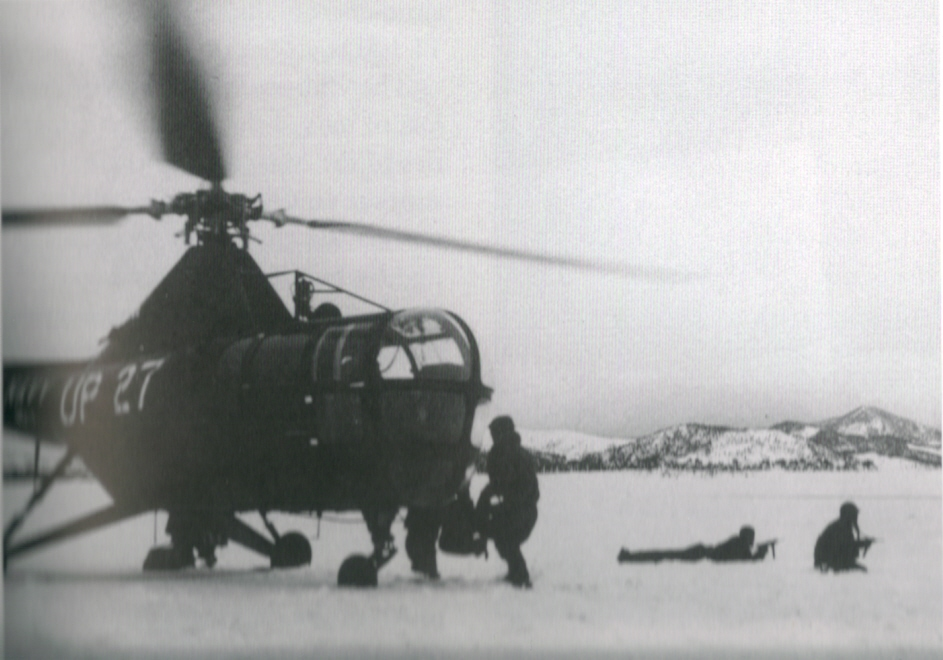
A U.S. Navy HO3S-1 in action during the Korean War (1950–1953).

During its service life, the H-5/HO3S-1 was used for utility, rescue, and mercy missions throughout the world, including flights during Operation Highjump in the Antarctic. While the extra power of the H-5 made it significantly more useful than its R-4 and R-6 cousins, the H-5/HO3S-1 suffered, like most early small tandem-seat single-rotor machines, from center of gravity problems. As a matter of routine, the helicopter was equipped with two iron-bar weights – each in a canvas case – one of 25 lb (11 kg) & one of 50 lb (23 kg). Flying with no passengers, both weights were placed forward alongside the pilot. With three passengers, both weights were normally placed in the baggage compartment. However, in conditions of high ambient temperatures, which reduced lift due to the lowered air density, all weights were jettisoned. If the weights could not be recovered later, pilots on future missions were forced to utilize rocks or other improvised weights next to the pilot after offloading three passengers, or else travel at a very slow 25 knots (46 km/h; 29 mph).

The H-5/HO3S-1 gained its greatest fame during the Korean War when it was called upon repeatedly to rescue United Nations pilots shot down behind enemy lines and to evacuate wounded personnel from frontline areas. It was eventually replaced in most roles by the H-19 Chickasaw. In 1957, the last H-5 and HO3S-1 helicopters were retired from active U.S. military service.

The S-51 was the first helicopter ever to be delivered to a commercial operator; on July 29, 1946, the first of three aircraft was handed over to the president of Helicopter Air Transport (HAT) at Sikorsky's plant in Bridgeport, Connecticut. HAT paid a discounted price of $48,500 per aircraft and operated them from Camden Central Airport, Camden, in New Jersey, carrying passengers, freight and mail to other local airports. Initially operating on a temporary license, the S-51 gained full Civil Aeronautics Authority (CAA) certification for commercial operation on April 17, 1947. In the United Kingdom, the first scheduled daily helicopter service started in June 1950 between Liverpool and Cardiff using S-51s operated by British European Airways (BEA).

== Variants ==
Data from:Aerofiles : Sikorsky

=== Sikorsky model numbers ===
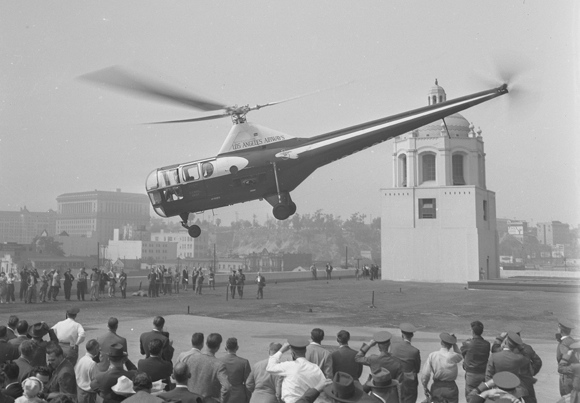
Los Angeles Airways S-51 inaugurating helicopter air-mail service, 1947

S-48
Company designation of the R-5/H-5.
S-51
Civil four-seat transport version; four purchased for inventory for U.S. Navy

=== USAAF/USAF designations ===
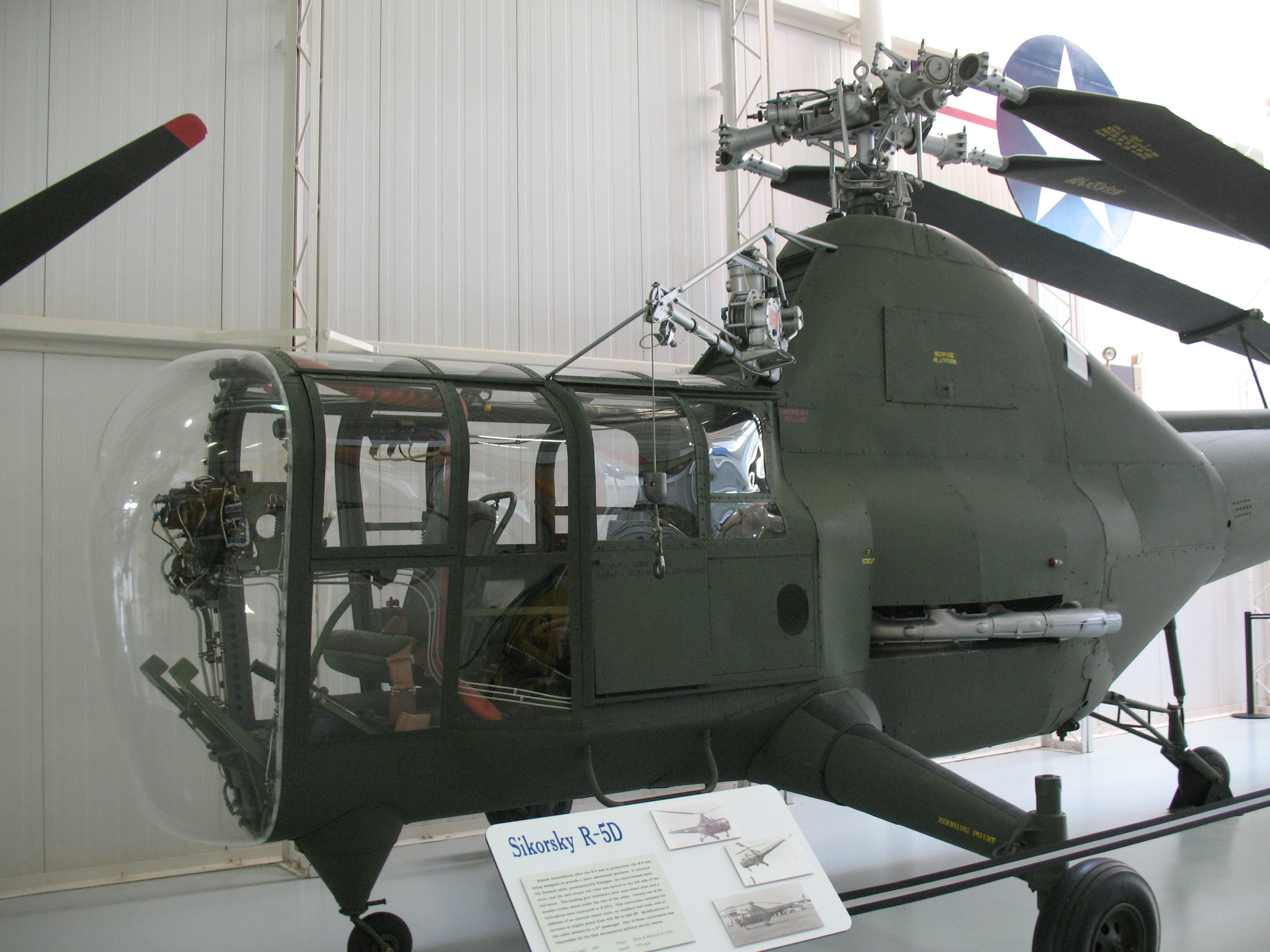
A U.S. Army R-5D at the Army Aviation Museum. Note the presence of both nosewheel and tailwheel.

XR-5
Prototype based on the VS-327 with two seats and tailwheel landing gear, powered by a 450 hp (340 kW) Pratt & Whitney R-985-AN-5 Wasp Junior; five built in 1943 (43-28236 to 43-28239, 43-47954).
YR-5 / YR-5A
As the XR-5 with minor modifications; 26 built in 1943, (43-46600 to 43-46625), including two to the United States Navy as HO2S-1s.
R-5A
Production rescue model with provision for two external stretchers; 34 built (43-46626 to 43-46659), later re-designated H-5A.
R-5B
Modified R-5A, not built
YR-5C
Modified R-5A, not built
YR-5D / R-5D
Modified R-5As with nosewheel landing gear, rescue hoist, later re-designated H-5D; twenty-one conversions in 1944 (43-46606, 43-46640 to 43-46659).
YR-5E
Modified YR-5As with dual controls in 1947, later re-designated YH-5E; five conversions from YR-5A (43-46611 to 43-46615).
R-5F
Civil model S-51 four-seaters bought in 1947 powered by 450 hp (340 kW) Pratt & Whitney R-985-AN-5, later re-designated H-5F; 11 built 1948 (47-480 to 47-490).
H-5G
Four-seater as H-5F with rescue equipment; 39 built 1948 (48-524 to 49-562).
H-5H
As for H-5G, with updated equipment and combination wheel and pontoon gear; 16 built 1949 (49-1996 to 49-2100).

=== US Navy designations ===
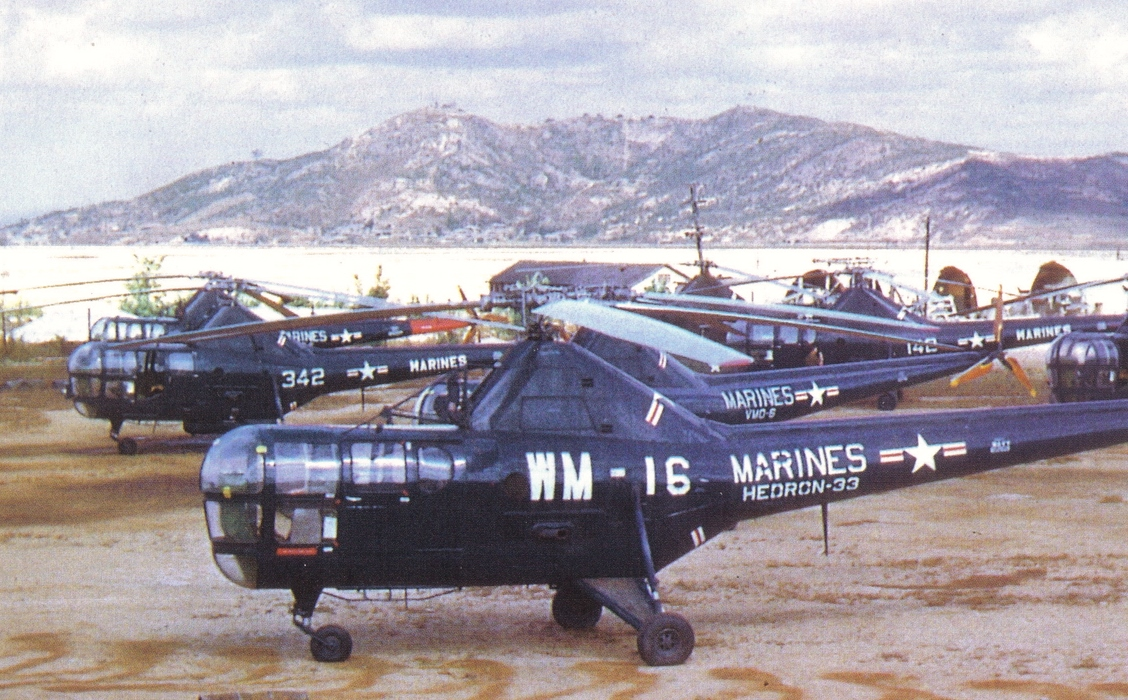
A group of U.S. Marine Corps HO3S-1 helicopters parked on a field in Incheon, South Korea

HO2S-1
Two YR-5As to the United States Navy later passed to the United States Coast Guard, order for 34 cancelled
HO3S-1
Four-seat version for the USN similar to the H-5F; 92 built in 1945 (Bureau Numbers 57995 to 57998, 122508 to 122529, 122709 to 122728, 123118 to 123143, 124334 to 124353)
HO3S-1G
HO3S-1 for the United States Coast Guard; 9 HO3S-1 transferred from the USN (1230 to 1238)
HO3S-2
Was a naval version of the H-5H, not built
XHO3S-3
One HO3S-1 modified in 1950 with a redesigned rotor

=== Thai designations ===
H.1A
(Thai: ฮ.๑ก) Royal Thai Armed Forces designation for the YH-5A.

== Operators ==
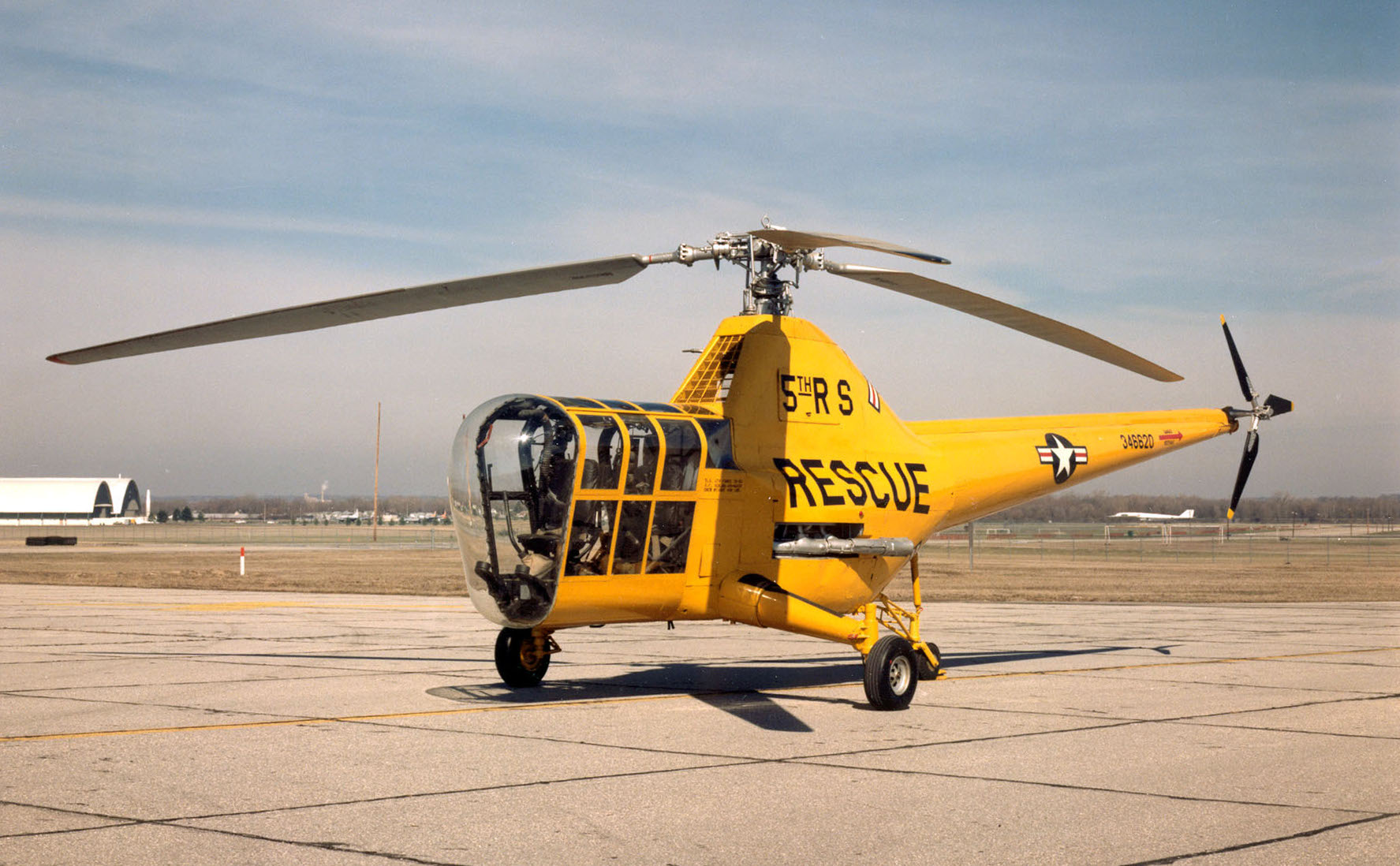
A Sikorsky YR-5A at the National Museum of the United States Air Force in Dayton, Ohio

Argentina

- Argentine Coast Guard
- Argentine Navy

Australia

- Royal Australian Air Force

Canada

- Royal Canadian Air Force
  - 103 Search and Rescue Squadron

Republic of China

- Republic of China Air Force

France

- Naval Air Arm

Netherlands

- Marineluchtvaartdienst

South Africa

- South African Air Force

United Kingdom

- See: Westland WS-51

United States

- Helicopter Air Transport
- Los Angeles Airways
- United States Air Force
- United States Coast Guard

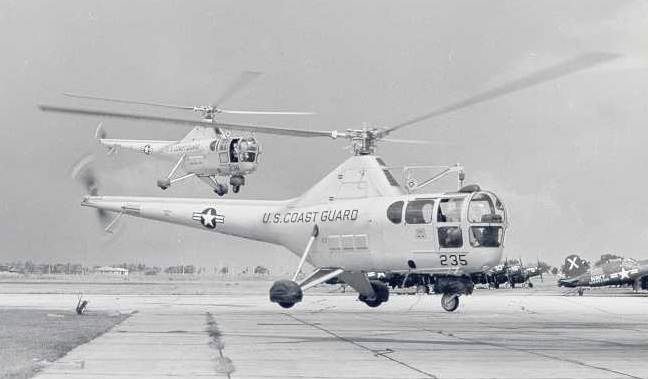
A pair of USCG HO3S-1s come in to land

- United States Marines
- United States Navy
- United States Post Office

== Surviving aircraft ==
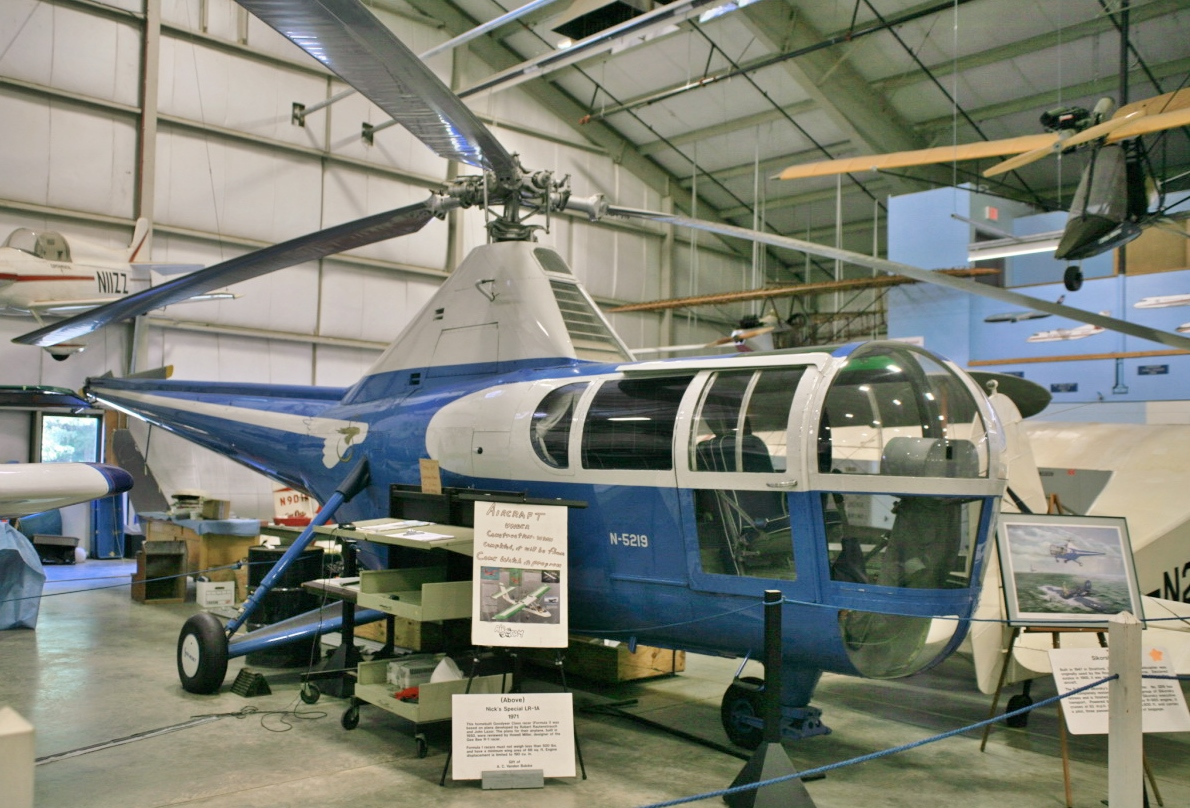
An S-51 on display at the New England Air Museum

- 43-46607/H1k-1/96 – YR-5A on display at the Royal Thai Air Force Museum, Don Muang Airport, Bangkok, Thailand
- 43-46620 – A YH-5A is on display at the National Museum of the United States Air Force at Wright-Patterson AFB near Dayton, Ohio. The aircraft is one of 26 ordered in 1944. It was obtained from Eglin Air Force Base, Florida, in March 1955.
- 43-46645 – H-5D on display at the United States Army Aviation Museum at Fort Novosel, Alabama.
- 43-47954 – An XR-5 is in storage with the National Air and Space Museum.
- 47-0484 – Carolinas Aviation Museum, Charlotte, North Carolina. Painted as bureau number 125136.
- 48-0548 – H-5G on display at the Pima Air & Space Museum adjacent to Davis-Monthan Air Force Base in Tucson, Arizona.
- 48-0558 – H-5G on display at the United States Army Aviation Museum at Fort Novosel, Alabama.
- 49-2007 – War Memorial of Korea, Seoul, Republic of Korea.
- 122515 – HO3S-1 restoration completed 2018 aboard the USS Midway Museum, San Diego, California. This airframe was at one point repaired using the tail boom from BuNo 124345. However, this tail boom was removed and replaced with the tail boom of a 3rd S-51. Only Dragonfly in US Navy colors
- USCG 1232 – HO3S-1G on display at the Pima Air & Space Museum adjacent to Davis-Monthan Air Force Base in Tucson, Arizona. On loan from the United States Coast Guard.
- USCG 1233 – HO3S-1G at Evergreen Aviation & Space Museum, McMinnville, Oregon.
- USCG 1235 – HO3S-1G at the National Museum of Naval Aviation in Pensacola, Florida
- RCAF 9601 – A Dragonfly is on display at the National Air Force Museum of Canada in Trenton, Ontario.
- RCAF 9602 – H-5A (S-51) on display at the New England Air Museum, Bradley International Airport, Windsor Locks, Connecticut
- RCAF 9603 – American Helicopter Museum & Education Center, West Chester, Pennsylvania
- RCAF 9607 – An H-5 is on display at the Aero Space Museum of Calgary in Calgary, Alberta.
- JRV-11503/WA/H/97 An S-51 Mk-1B is on display at the Air Museum at Nikola Tesla Airport, Belgrade, Serbia
- RAAF A80-374 – A S-51 that served with the Royal Australian Air Force from 1951 to 1964, in the collection of the RAAF Museum, Point Cook, Victoria, Australia.

== Specifications ==
3-view line drawing of the Sikorsky R-5

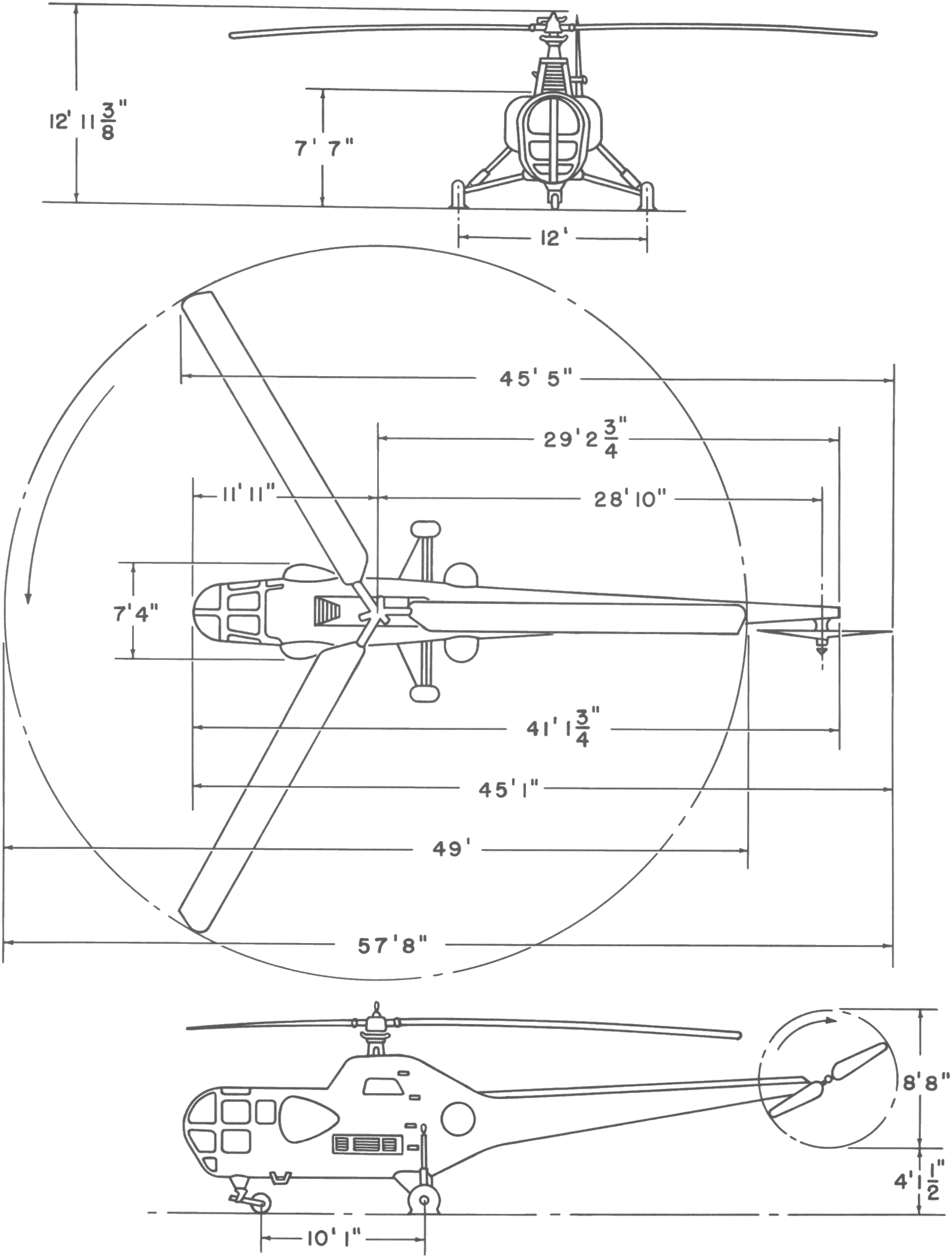
3-view line drawing of the Sikorsky H-5H

Data from United States Military Aircraft since 1909

General characteristics

- Crew: 1 or 2
- Capacity: two stretchers in external panniers
- Length: 57 ft 1 in (17.40 m)
- Height: 13 ft 0 in (3.96 m)
- Empty weight: 3,780 lb (1,715 kg)
- Gross weight: 4,825 lb (2,189 kg)
- Powerplant: 1 × Pratt & Whitney R-985 Wasp Junior 9-cylinder air-cooled radial piston engine, 450 hp (340 kW)
- Main rotor diameter: 48 ft 0 in (14.63 m)
- Main rotor area: 1,810 sq ft (168 m^{2})

Performance

- Maximum speed: 106 mph (171 km/h, 92 kn)
- Range: 360 mi (580 km, 310 nmi)
- Service ceiling: 14,400 ft (4,400 m)
- Time to altitude: 10,000 ft (3,000 m) in 15 minutes
