= Weatherly Aviation Company =

American agricultural aircraft manufacturer

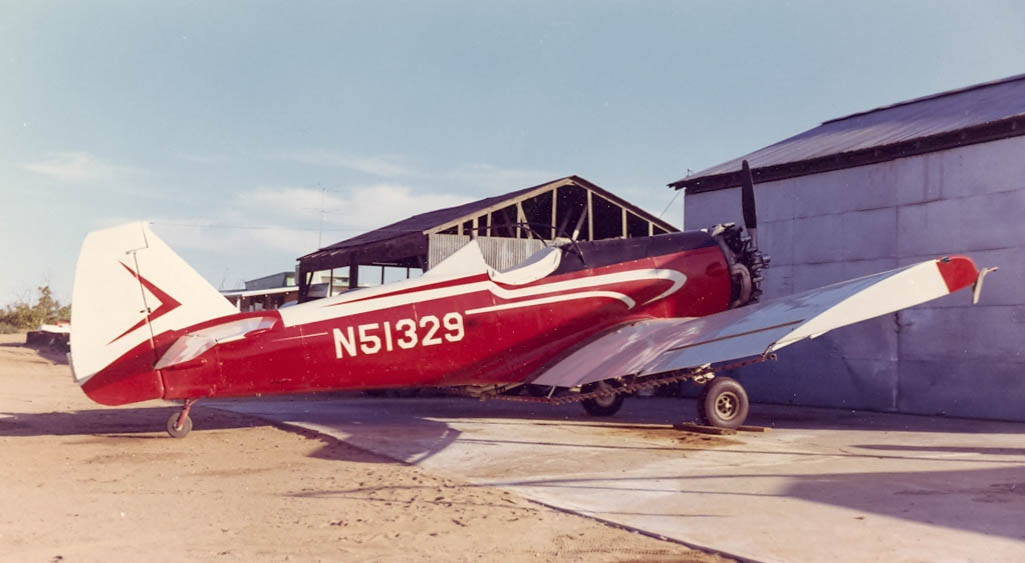
A Weatherley WM-62C agricultural aircraft

Weatherly Aviation Company was an American agricultural aircraft manufacturer formed on 28 March 1961 in California. The company was formed by John C. Weatherley to modify surplus Fairchild M-62 Cornell military training aircraft for agricultural tasks.

The prototype conversion was designated the WM-62C and over the next five years the company converted 19 aircraft. When it became impossible to find any more Cornells to convert, Weatherley designed his own aircraft, the Weatherley 201. Two prototypes were built and the type entered production in 1968. An improved version, the Weatherly 620, was built from 1979; it had a higher gross weight that allowed it carry a larger chemical hopper for spraying.

== Aircraft ==
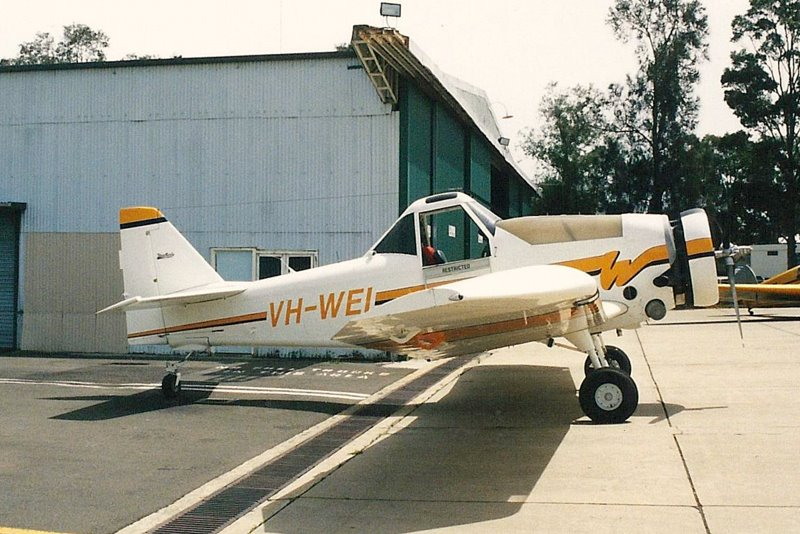
Weatherly 620B in 1991

- Weatherly WM-62C
- Weatherly 201
- Weatherly 620
