= Helicopter Air Transport =

World's first commercial helicopter operator

Helicopter Air Transport Inc.
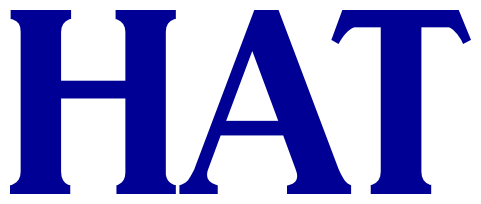
IATA	ICAO	Call sign
–	–	–
- Founded: 1945
- Commenced operations: 1946
- Ceased operations: 1947
- Fleet size: 7
- Headquarters: Camden Central Airport, NJ, US
- Key people: Jonathan Wilford, Norman Edgar

Helicopter Air Transport Incorporated (HAT) was formed in New Jersey, United States, to exploit the helicopters which were developed during World War II. It was the world's first commercial helicopter operator.

== Origins ==
The company was formed in 1945 by Jonathan (John) Wilford and Norman Wallace George Edgar. Edgar was a British businessman who had been an army captain in World War I. After the war he founded, in south-west England, the airline that became Western Airways Ltd, which shortly before World War II was the world's busiest airline. During the war, he worked for the Air Transport Auxiliary (ATA), going to the US to recruit women pilots for the organisation. After the war, Edgar stayed in the US with a plan to form the world's first commercial operator of helicopters as soon as they became available.

John Wilford became president of HAT and Norman Edgar was executive vice president. Their base was Camden Central Airport, New Jersey,. The airport, which had formerly been called Crescent Airport, closed in 1957.

They employed Peter Wright as sales manager. He had previously flown Curtiss P-40s with the Flying Tigers, and with American Export Airlines as a flying boat pilot. Frank T Cashman, an ex-United States Army Air Force chief instructor on helicopters, was appointed chief pilot.

They also employed other ex-Air Force helicopter pilots including Lou Leavitt, who had been the test pilot for the Platt-LePage XR-1 and previously an autogyro test pilot for the Kellett Autogiro Corporation and the Pitcairn Aircraft Company.

== Operations ==
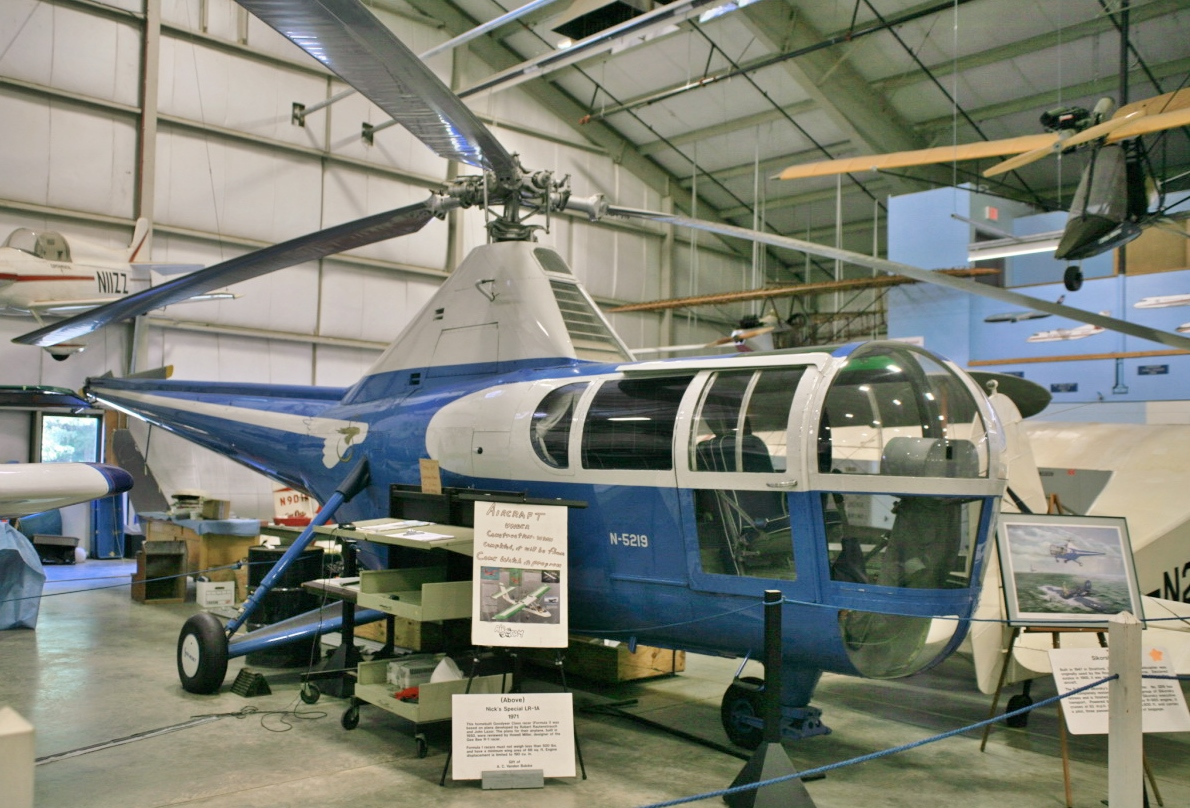
An S-51 in Sikorsky house colours as used by HAT

Their first aircraft were three Sikorsky S-51 four-seat helicopters which were delivered fresh from the manufacturer. These were delivered to Camden during August 1946, the first one having earlier been officially handed over at the manufacturer's plant at Bridgeport, Connecticut, on 29 July. These were the first ever commercial helicopter deliveries.

They were immediately put to work: a company brochure stated "For numerous months, Helicopter Air Transport was finding its own answers to questions concerning the future of the commercial helicopter. They carried out survey flights, transporting passengers and executive charters, plus flying the U.S. mail."

HAT started a flying school for helicopter pilots and mechanics in the autumn of 1946 at Camden Central, with Frank Cashman at its head. Sikorsky and Bell had their own schools, but these were for owners rather than commercial operators, and the HAT school was recognised by the manufacturers as well as by the Civil Aeronautics Administration (CAA). Even the French air ministry sent trainees to the school.

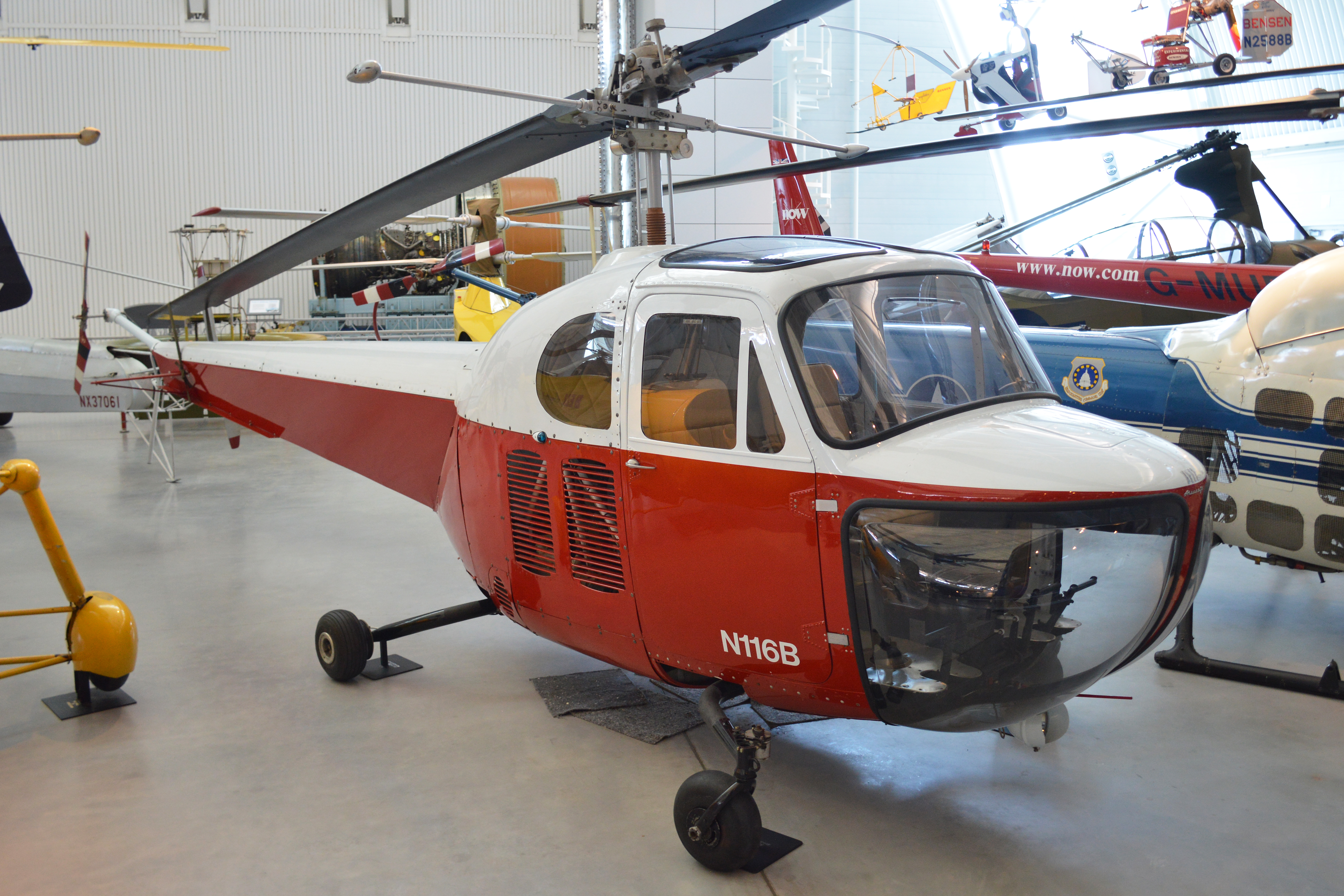
A Bell 47B, the type used by HAT

In December 1946 and January 1947, three Bell 47B two-seat helicopters were delivered, and operations could proceed in earnest, with other Bell 47s being leased from Bell as needs arose. HAT experimented with all kinds of services, including charter and pleasure flights, package delivery and mail flights, pipeline and powerline surveying, aerial photography, police assistance, cattle herding, and a particularly successful oil exploration survey which was carried out for Standard Oil with a float-equipped Bell 47B over marshlands in Louisiana. HAT demonstrated a rescue operation at Ocean City, New Jersey, with a lifeguard dropped near a swimmer, and the pair were then slowly towed with a line from the helicopter back to the beach. They carried out some crop protection by flying over fields, proving the theory that the downwash would prevent damage from late frosts. Some rudimentary crop dusting was also undertaken.

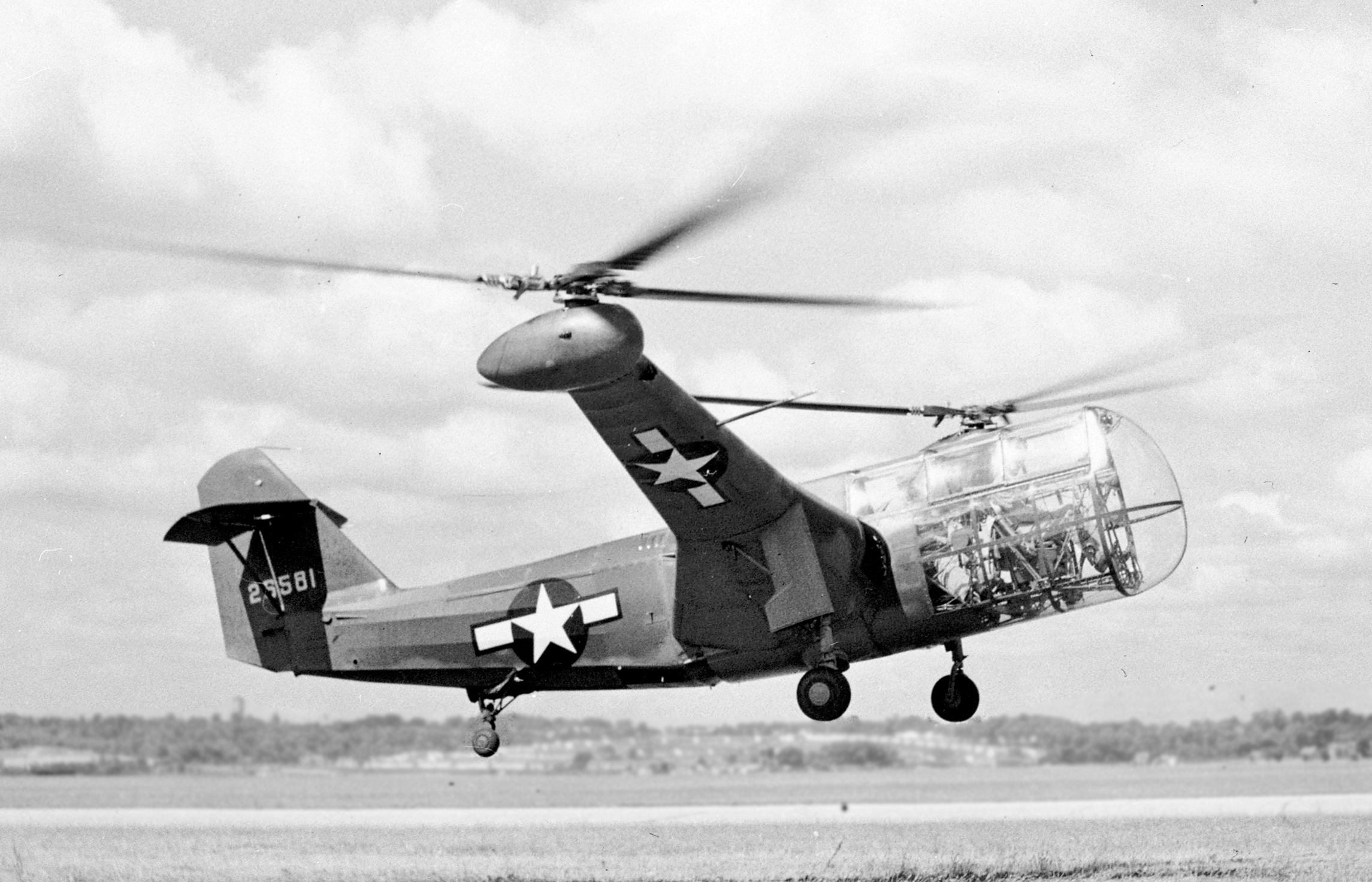
Platt-LePage XR-1A 42-6581 during Army testing

In the spring of 1947, HAT acquired, through Lou Leavitt, the XR-1A twin-rotor helicopter from the Platt-LePage Aircraft Company, and repair work started to bring it to airworthiness after an earlier crash. It was painted in the HAT livery, and there were plans to test it as a crop duster and utility aircraft, but there is no record of any use being made of it.

== Fleet ==
Helicopter Air Transport fleet, summer 1947
Aircraft	Number	Notes
Bell 47B	3	NC7H, NC15H, NC21H plus others leased from Bell.
Platt-LePage XR-1A	1	NX6950 ex 42-6581
Sikorsky S-51	3	NC13301, NC92803, (Note: After Sikorsky reclaimed this aircraft it was sold to the US Coast Guard as 233. It later became N65760 and is now on display at the Evergreen Aviation & Space Museum. Oregon, in its Coast Guard livery.) NC92804
Total	7

The Bell and Platt-LePage helicopters were painted overall red, and the Sikorskys wore the manufacturer's house colours of blue and silver.

== Decline ==
On 21 September 1947 one of the S-51s (NC92804) was destroyed in a training accident. (Note: A HAT instructor was demonstrating the S-51 when he lost control and crashed. Neither he nor his pupil was injured. The pupil was Jean Boulet, who completed his transition training at the Bell school and returned to France to become a noted helicopter test pilot for SNCASE and its successor companies.) Around that time it was also becoming apparent that despite Edgar's conviction that commercial helicopter operations were successful and had a promising future, they were also extremely expensive to run. Cash flow was turning negative, and on 21 October 1947 HAT filed for bankruptcy and Bell and Sikorsky repossessed their machines. An asset sale was held on 2 April 1948, and the XR-1A was sold to Frank Piasecki, who had been an engineer with Platt-LePage during its development and had started his own company, Piasecki Helicopter. Leavitt made the short delivery flight to Piasecki, but it didn't fly again, though the airframe was used for a new Piasecki design, the PA-2B Ringwing tiltrotor.

Peter Wright went on to form Keystone Helicopters, and later started the American Helicopter Museum. Norman Edgar died in Nova Scotia, Canada in 1983.
