= Platt-LePage XR-1 =

1941 American experimental helicopter

XR-1
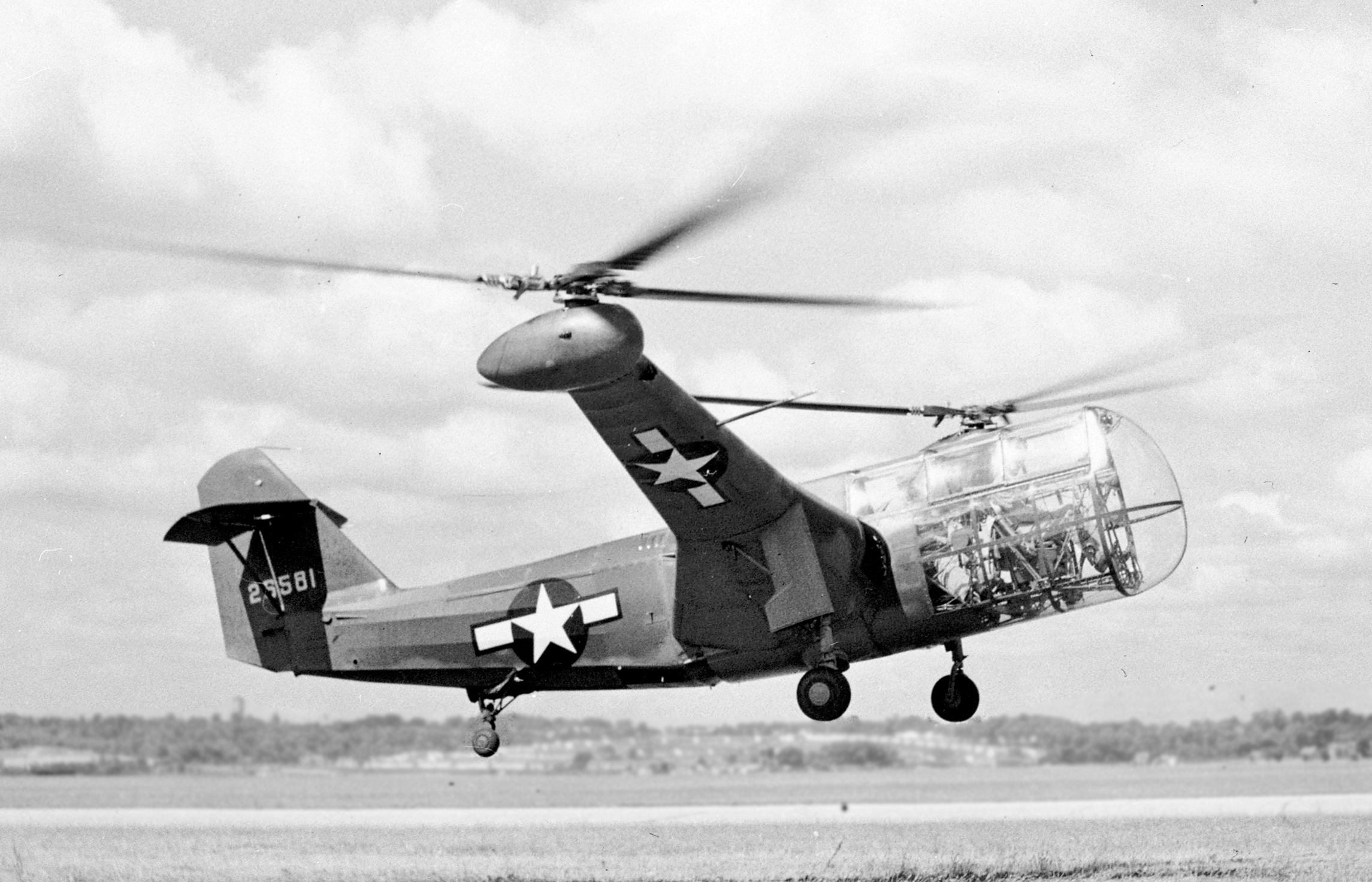
- XR-1A

General information
- Type: Experimental helicopter
- Manufacturer: Platt-LePage Aircraft Company
- Primary user: United States Army Air Forces
- Number built: 2

History
- First flight: May 12, 1941
- Retired: June 21, 1946

The Platt-LePage XR-1, also known by the company designation PL-3, is an early American transverse-rotor helicopter, built by the Platt-LePage Aircraft Company of Eddystone, Pennsylvania. The winner of a United States Army Air Corps design competition held in early 1940, the XR-1 was the first helicopter tested by the USAAF, flying in 1941. The flight testing of the XR-1 proved troublesome, and although continued testing showed that the design had promise, other, improved helicopters were becoming available before the XR-1 was ready for service. As a result, the development of the aircraft was terminated in 1945.

== Design and development ==
Developed during 1939 from an earlier, unsuccessful design, the PL-1, the Platt-LePage Model PL-3 was the winner of a 1940 design competition, held under the terms of the Dorsey-Logan Act, for the supply of a helicopter design to the United States Army Air Corps. Platt-LePage's submission was judged by the Army to be superior to its competitors, which included a helicopter submitted by Vought-Sikorsky, and autogyros developed by Kellett and Pitcairn. (Note: Despite being rejected in favour of the XR-1, the Vought-Sikorsky design would be developed into the Sikorsky VS-300, while Kellett's autogyro would be purchased for evaluation by the Army as the Kellett XR-2; Pitcairn's proposed design was the Picairn PA-36.)

Following the selection of the Platt-LePage design in May 1940, a contract for the construction of a prototype and a static test airframe was issued in July of that year. The contract specified delivery of the flying prototype in January 1941, however the aircraft was not completed until three months later than the contract schedule, a delay that led to Sikorsky receiving Dorsey-Logan Act funding for development of its design, which became the XR-4.

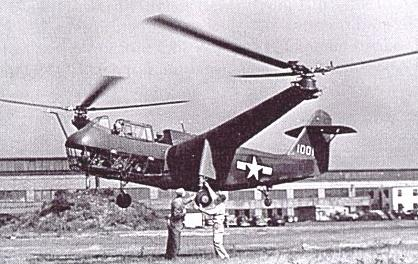
XR-1 early in testing

In its design, the XR-1 bore a strong resemblance to the Focke-Wulf Fw 61, a helicopter developed by Henrich Focke in Germany that, flown by Hanna Reitsch, had impressed Platt-LePage co-founder Wynn LePage during a tour of Europe. The XR-1 was powered by a Pratt & Whitney R-985 radial engine, mounted in a buried installation within the fuselage. The aircraft had two, three-bladed rotors, mounted in a side-by-side arrangement on wing-like pylons. The pylons were aerodynamically designed to produce some lift when in forwards flight, slightly unloading the rotors. The construction of the XR-1 was conventional by the standards of the time, with the aircraft's frame consisting of a steel-tube framework, which was covered with fabric. The XR-1 had tail surfaces similar to those of a conventional aircraft, and was equipped with a fixed, taildragger landing gear. The aircraft's wheels freely castered for easier maneuvering on the ground.

The cockpit of the XR-1 seated the aircraft's two crew members in a tandem arrangement, the pilot located ahead of the observer, and was extensively glazed to provide good visibility in the aircraft's intended observation and army co-operation role. During the development of the aircraft, Major General Robert M. Danford proposed to the War Department that the XR-1 be evaluated against the Stinson YO-54 and the Kellett YG-1B autogyro.

== Operational history ==
Following several months of ground testing, the XR-1 conducted its maiden flight on May 12, 1941, although the aircraft was restrained by a tether for its early flights. On June 23 the aircraft conducted its first free flight, albeit remaining within a few feet of the ground. As flight testing continued and the aircraft's performance envelope was expanded, the XR-1's quickly proved troublesome, the testing showing a variety of troubles with the design. These included issues with the aircraft's controls, insufficient control authority being present, and in addition there were resonance issues with the airframe that made the XR-1 prone to pilot-induced oscillations. The aircraft was modified in an attempt to resolve these issues, and the Army modified Platt-LePage's contract to provide additional funding for improvements to the design, but despite this the XR-1's problems continued. In addition, the company's test pilot, Lou Leavitt, lacked confidence in the design, refusing to fly the aircraft to its full potential. The situation was only resolved when Colonel H. Franklin Gregory, director of rotor-wing projects for the Army Air Forces, flew the aircraft himself, reaching 100 mph (160 km/h) on his first flight in the aircraft.

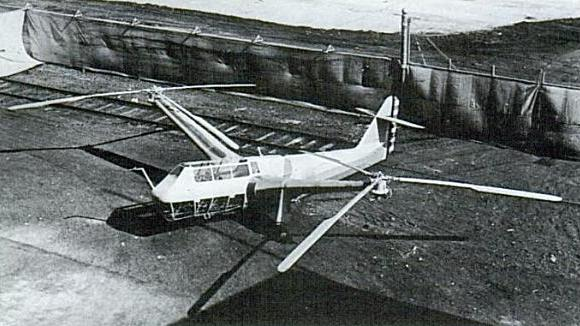
XR-1 top view

With the worst of the aircraft's problems believed to have been resolved, the XR-1 was submitted for service testing by the Army Air Forces in 1943. During the course of the Army's evaluations, the XR-1's empennage failed during structural testing, the surfaces being strengthened as a result and testing, following the repairs, resuming in 1944. Despite the modifications to the design, however, the XR-1 still proved to be deficient in control authority. In July 1943, the XR-1 program suffered a setback when the aircraft crashed, seriously injuring test pilot Jim Ray, who had replaced Leavitt following the latter's dismissal from the company. The crash was caused by an inspector's error in leaving a suspect part on the aircraft, the rotor hub failing in flight as a result of the decision. The aircraft was repairable, but it would be a year before the XR-1 was ready to fly again.

Testing was, however, able to continue in the meantime, as Platt-LePage had re-negotiated the XR-1 contract to cover a second flight-test aircraft. Built to a revised and improved version of the XR-1's design and designated XR-1A, the second aircraft had flown for the first time in May 1943. The XR-1A featured a revised cockpit covering compared to that of the XR-1, with the area of glazing being increased for improved visibility, and the pilot and observer's positions being reversed, the pilot now seated in the rear cockpit. During flight testing the XR-1A was found superior in flight performance to the XR-1; however, the controls were still proving troublesome, although the worst of the bugs did seem to have been worked out.

Following a cross-country flight to Wright Field in Ohio from Platt-LePage's Pennsylvania plant, testing of the XR-1A continued until a mechanical failure in the rotor hub led to a crash landing on 26 October 1944, the company deciding to sell the wreckage for scrap.

The XR-1, having been repaired in the meantime, was once again flying, and a contract had been awarded to Platt-Lepage for the construction of seven pre-production aircraft, to be built to an improved version of the XR-1A design, and designated YR-1A. Motivated by Congressional concerns about potential favouritism towards Sikorsky Aircraft, which had in the meantime been given a contract for development of an improved version of their VS-300 experimental helicopter, the contract called for delivery of the first YR-1A to the Army in January 1945. However, due to continued financial and flight-testing problems, Platt-Lepage proved incapable of meeting this schedule.

Although the XR-1's problems seemed to be approaching resolution by late 1944, the protracted development of the aircraft meant that alternative, improved helicopters, such as Sikorsky's XR-4, less expensive and more maneuverable than Platt-LePage's aircraft, were becoming available. In addition, even the XR-1A's improvements had failed to cure the aircraft of all of its control and vibration problems, and the AAF's Air Materiel Command considered the company "inept" in its work, applying a "hit-or-miss method" to research and development. As a result of this assessment, the Army's contracts with the company were universally cancelled in early April 1945.

Following the cancellation of the Army's contract, the XR-1 was returned to the company, Platt-LePage believing that the design had potential as a civilian aircraft. The planned civilian version, the PL-9, would have been an enlarged, twin-engined aircraft; however Platt-LePage was by now in serious financial difficulty following the cancellation of its Army contract, and in mid 1946 the XR-1's flight test program was concluded, the aircraft being retired to the Smithsonian Institution.

In the meantime, the company's former test pilot, Lou Leavitt, had purchased the wreckage of the XR-1A at a price of 4 cents per pound. Leavitt was a pilot with Helicopter Air Transport, which was providing helicopter services in anticipation of a postwar aviation boom, and the XR-1A was returned to flying condition. The projected boom failed to materialise, however, and HAT quickly entered bankruptcy, selling the XR-1A to Frank Piasecki, another former Platt-LePage employee who had now started his own helicopter company. Leavitt flew the helicopter to Piasecki, who never flew it due to airworthiness concerns, and used the airframe in the development of the PA-2B, a planned tiltrotor which failed to proceed beyond the mock-up stage.

== Variants ==
XR-1
First prototype; one built.
XR-1A
Second prototype with increased cockpit glazing and improved engine; one built.
YR-1A
Seven pre-production aircraft ordered; contract cancelled before any completed.
Piasecki PA-2B
Proposed tiltrotor based on XR-1 airframe; not built.

== Operators ==
United States
United States Army Air Forces

== Surviving aircraft ==
Following the conclusion of flight testing, the XR-1 was returned to the Army Air Forces, who placed the aircraft in storage before donating it to the Smithsonian Institution's National Air and Space Museum. The unrestored aircraft is stored at the Paul Garber Restoration and Storage Facility in "remarkable condition".

== Specifications (XR-1A) ==
Data from Connor and Lee 2000; Lambermont 1958

General characteristics

- Crew: Two (Pilot and observer)
- Length: 29 ft 4 in (8.94 m)
- Wingspan: 65 ft 0 in (19.81 m)
- Height: 9 ft 0 in (2.74 m)
- Gross weight: 4,730 lb (2,145 kg)
- Powerplant: 1 × Pratt & Whitney R-985-AN-1 radial piston engine, 450 hp (340 kW)
- Main rotor diameter: 2 × 31 ft 6 in (9.60 m)

Performance

- Maximum speed: 110 mph (177 km/h, 96 kn)
- Disk loading: 4.1 lb/sq ft (19.9 kg/m^{2})
- Power/mass: 10.8 lb (4.9kg)/hp

== See also ==
Aircraft of comparable role, configuration, and era

- Bratukhin Omega
- Focke-Achgelis Fa 223
- Focke-Wulf Fw 61
- McDonnell XHJD Whirlaway

Related lists

- List of military aircraft of the United States
- Transverse rotors
