= Weatherly 201 =

American agricultural aircraft

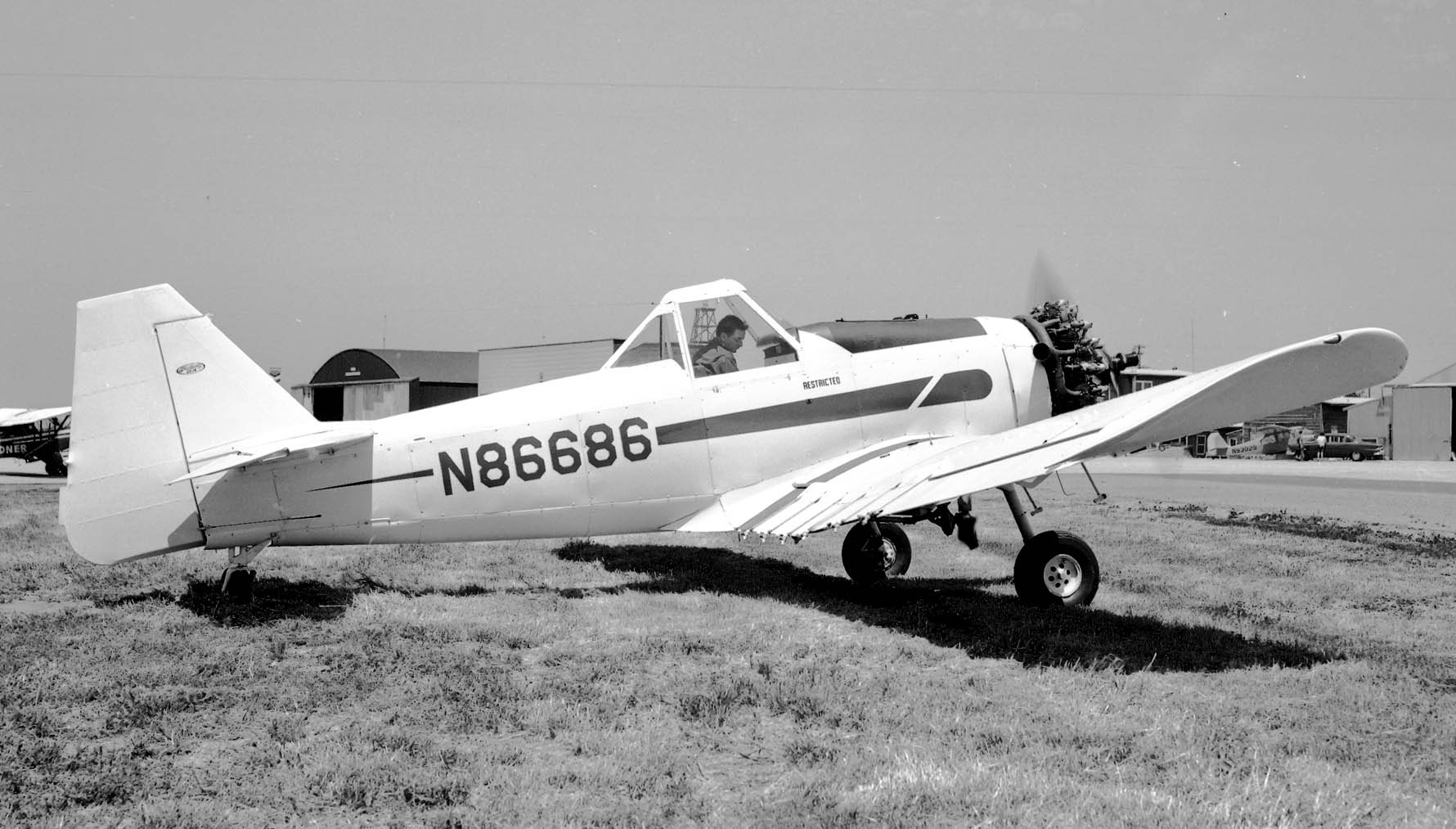

General information
- Type: Agricultural monoplane
- Manufacturer: Weatherly Aviation Company
- Designer: John Weatherly
- Number built: 100+

History
- First flight: 1967
- Developed into: Weatherly 620

The Weatherly Model 201 is a 1960s American agricultural monoplane designed and built by the Weatherly Aviation Company of Hollister, California.

== Development ==
In the early 1960s, John Weatherly formed the Weatherly Aviation Company, to convert 19 Fairchild M-62s into the Weatherly WM-62C agricultural aircraft. With this experience, Weatherly designed his own agricultural monoplane, the Weatherly Model 201. The Weatherly 201 is a cantilever low-wing monoplane, with a fixed tailwheel landing gear, and powered by a nose-mounted 450 hp (336 kW) Pratt & Whitney R-985 radial engine. Its fuselage is constructed of steel tube with aluminium panel covering, while the wings, which are unswept and have 6 degrees of dihedral, are of all metal (aluminium) construction. It has an enclosed cockpit for the pilot, and a glassfibre 270 gallon (1022 litre) chemical hopper in the forward fuselage. It was designed for crop dusting and liquid spraying, and was certified in 1967.

In 1970, the Model 201A was introduced that had a larger chemical hopper and fuel capacity; it was also built as the Model 201B with minor improvements. In 1975, another improved version, the Model 201C, was introduced.

By 1979, more than 100 Model 201s had been built, and it was then succeeded by the improved Weatherly 620.

== Variants ==
Model 201
Initial production variant, 2 built.
Model 201A
Enlarged fuel capacity and a larger chemical hopper, 5 built.
Model 201B
201A with a wider canopy, leading fillet at wing root and other minor improvements, 45 built.
Model 201C
Improved variant, 38 built.

== Specifications (201A) ==
Data from Jane's All The World's Aircraft 1971-72

General characteristics

- Crew: 1
- Capacity: 260 US Gallons (984 litres) hopper
- Length: 26 ft 7 in (8.10 m)
- Wingspan: 39 ft 0 in (11.89 m)
- Height: 7 ft 11 in (2.41 m)
- Wing area: 248 sq ft (23.1 m^{2})
- Empty weight: 2,550 lb (1,157 kg)
- Gross weight: 3,500 lb (1,588 kg)
- Max takeoff weight: 4,800 lb (2,177 kg)
- Powerplant: 1 × Pratt & Whitney R-985 nine-cylinder single row air cooled radial engine, 450 hp (336 kW)

Performance

- Maximum speed: 111 kn (128 mph, 206 km/h) at sea level
- Cruise speed: 91 kn (105 mph, 169 km/h)
- Stall speed: 46 kn (53 mph, 85 km/h)
- Never exceed speed: 125.5 kn (145 mph, 233 km/h)
- Rate of climb: 960 ft/min (4.9 m/s)
