= McDonnell XHJH Whirlaway =

XHJH Whirlaway
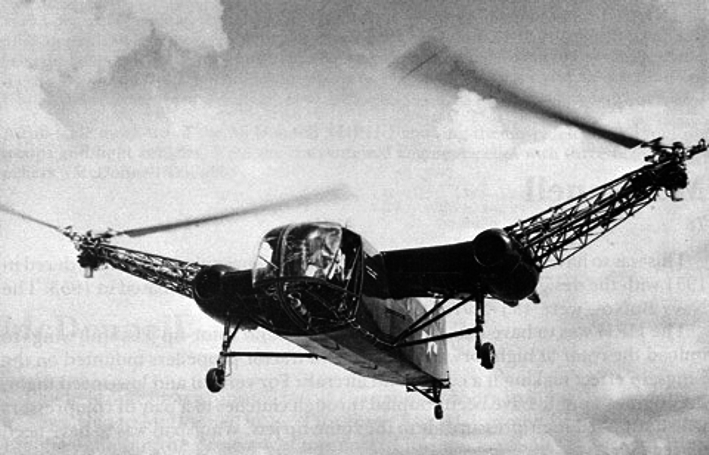

General information
- Type: Experimental twin-rotor helicopter
- National origin: United States
- Manufacturer: McDonnell Aircraft Corporation
- Number built: 1

History
- First flight: 27 April 1946

The McDonnell XHJH Whirlaway, a.k.a. McDonnell Model 37, is a 1940s American experimental transverse-rotor helicopter designed and built by McDonnell Aircraft Corporation for the United States Navy and was the largest helicopter at the time, as well as the first successful twin-engined twin-rotor helicopter in the world.

== Design and development ==
In 1944, the United States Navy issued a requirement for a large rescue helicopter with capacity for ten occupants. The design was originally designated XHJD-1; shortly after flying it was re-designated the XHJH-1. It was derived from the single-engined, twin rotor Platt-LePage XR-1. James McDonnell had invested in that company in 1942 and some of his engineers had been working there, gaining experience of helicopter design and production techniques. McDonnell took control of the company in June 1944. The XHJH-1 first flew two months later. It had twin side-by-side 46 ft (14 m) rotors at the end of pylon wings which turned in opposite directions. Each rotor was powered by a 450 hp (336 kW) Pratt & Whitney R-985-AN-14B Wasp Junior engine.

== Variants ==
XHJD-1
Company designation Model 37. Original United States Navy designation.
XHJH-1
Designation changed before first flight.
HJD-1
Company designation Model 37A and Model 61. Proposed production version.

== Aircraft on display ==
The sole XHJH-1 is held by the National Air and Space Museum.

== Specifications ==
Data from Aerofiles :McDonnell, Jane's All the World's Aircraft 1949-50, McDonnell Douglas aircraft since 1920 Vol.2

General characteristics

- Crew: 1
- Capacity: 1-9 pax
- Length: 32 ft 2 in (9.80 m)
- Wingspan: 41 ft (12 m) between rotor centres
- Width: 87 ft (27 m) overall with rotors turning
- Gross weight: 11,000 lb (4,990 kg)
- Powerplant: 2 × Pratt & Whitney R-985-AN-14B Wasp Junior 9-cylinder air-cooled radial piston engines, 450 hp (340 kW) each
- Main rotor diameter: 2 × 46–50 ft (14–15 m)
- Main rotor area: 3,324 sq ft (308.8 m^{2}) rotors of varying diameter fitted for testing

Performance

- Maximum speed: 120 mph (190 km/h, 100 kn) at 5,000 ft (1,524 m)
- Cruise speed: 90 mph (140 km/h, 78 kn)
- Range: 300 mi (480 km, 260 nmi)
- Service ceiling: 12,900 ft (3,900 m) absolute
- Rate of climb: 1,300 ft/min (6.6 m/s)
- Disk loading: 2.8–3.3 lb/sq ft (14–16 kg/m^{2}) dependent on rotors fitted
- Power/mass: 0.082 hp/lb (0.135 kW/kg)

== See also ==
Aircraft of comparable role, configuration, and era

- Bratukhin Omega
- Focke-Achgelis Fa 223
- Focke-Wulf Fw 61

Related lists

- List of rotorcraft
