= Weatherly 620 =

Type of aircraft

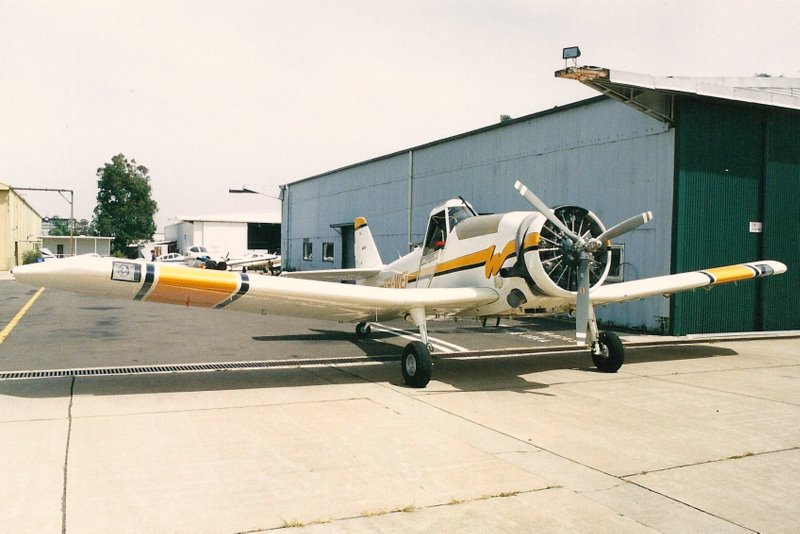
- A Weatherly 620B in 1998

General information
- Type: Agricultural aircraft
- National origin: United States
- Manufacturer: Weatherly Aircraft Company
- Number built: 155

History
- First flight: 1979
- Developed from: Weatherly 201

The Weatherly 620 is a 1970s American agricultural monoplane designed and built as an improved variant of the Weatherly 201 by the Weatherly Aircraft Company of McClellan, California.

== Design ==
The Weatherley 620 is an all-metal single-seat low-wing cantilever monoplane with a conventional landing gear with a tailwheel. Examples have been fitted with a Pratt & Whitney R-985 radial engine, and PT6A or TPE331 turboprop engine, driving a three-bladed tractor propeller. In the forward fuselage, the aircraft has a either a 355 US gallon hopper or a 320 US gallon hopper that feeds an agricultural dispersal system. Most pilots that fly the weatherly aircraft, prefer the 320 gallon hopper aircraft.

== Variants ==
Model 620
1979 initial production variant.
Model 620A
1987 production variant with a Pratt & Whitney R-985 radial engine.
Model 620B
1992 production variant with a Pratt & Whitney R-985 radial engine.
Model 620TP
1980 turboprop variant with a Pratt & Whitney PT6A-11AG.
Model 620B-TG
1997 improved turboprop variant to replace the 620TP with a Honeywell TPE331 turboprop.

== Specifications (620BTG) ==
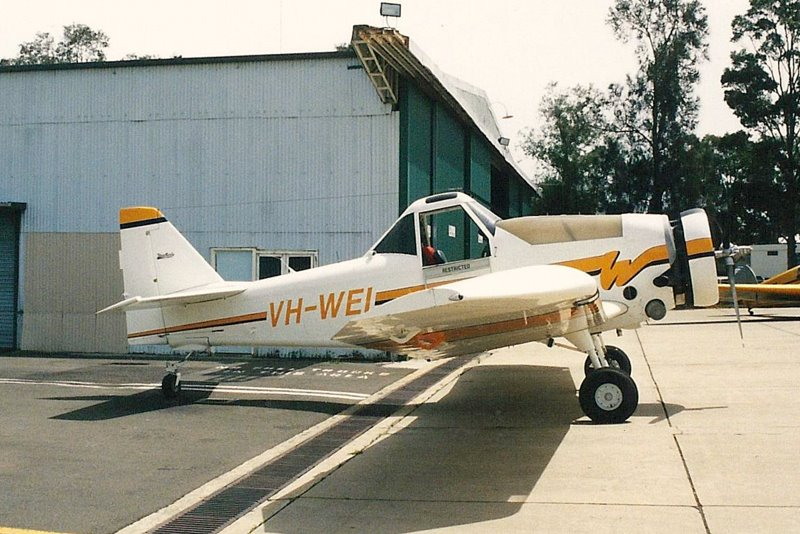
Side view of Weatherly 620B

Data from Jane's All The World's Aircraft 2004-05

General characteristics

- Crew: 1
- Capacity: 355 US Gallons (1344litres) hopper
- Length: 29 ft 8 in (9.04 m)
- Wingspan: 46 ft 8 in (14.22 m)
- Height: 9 ft 6 in (2.90 m)
- Wing area: 277 sq ft (23.1 m^{2})
- Empty weight: 3,030 lb (1,374 kg)
- Max takeoff weight: 6,000 lb (2,721 kg)
- Powerplant: 1 × Honeywell TPE331 turboprop, 500 hp (373 kW)

Performance

- Cruise speed: 122 kn (140 mph, 226 km/h)
- Stall speed: 62 kn (72 mph, 115 km/h)
- Never exceed speed: 153 kn (176 mph, 283 km/h)
- Service ceiling: 15,000 ft (4,572 m)
- Rate of climb: 1,400 ft/min (7.1 m/s)
