= Laurence Weatherley =

British engineer

Laurence Weatherley is a British engineer, currently the Albert P. Learned Distinguished Professor and chair of the Department of Chemical & Petroleum Engineering at University of Kansas. He is a Fellow of the Institution of Chemical Engineers and Institution of Professional Engineers New Zealand and, in 1992, he was the DuPont Endowed Chair at Queens University of Belfast. He was the head of the Department of Chemical & Process engineering at the University of Canterbury in Christchurch, New Zealand, from 1998 to 2004.
