= Pratt & Whitney R-985 Wasp Junior =

9-cylinder radial engine family

R-985 Wasp Junior
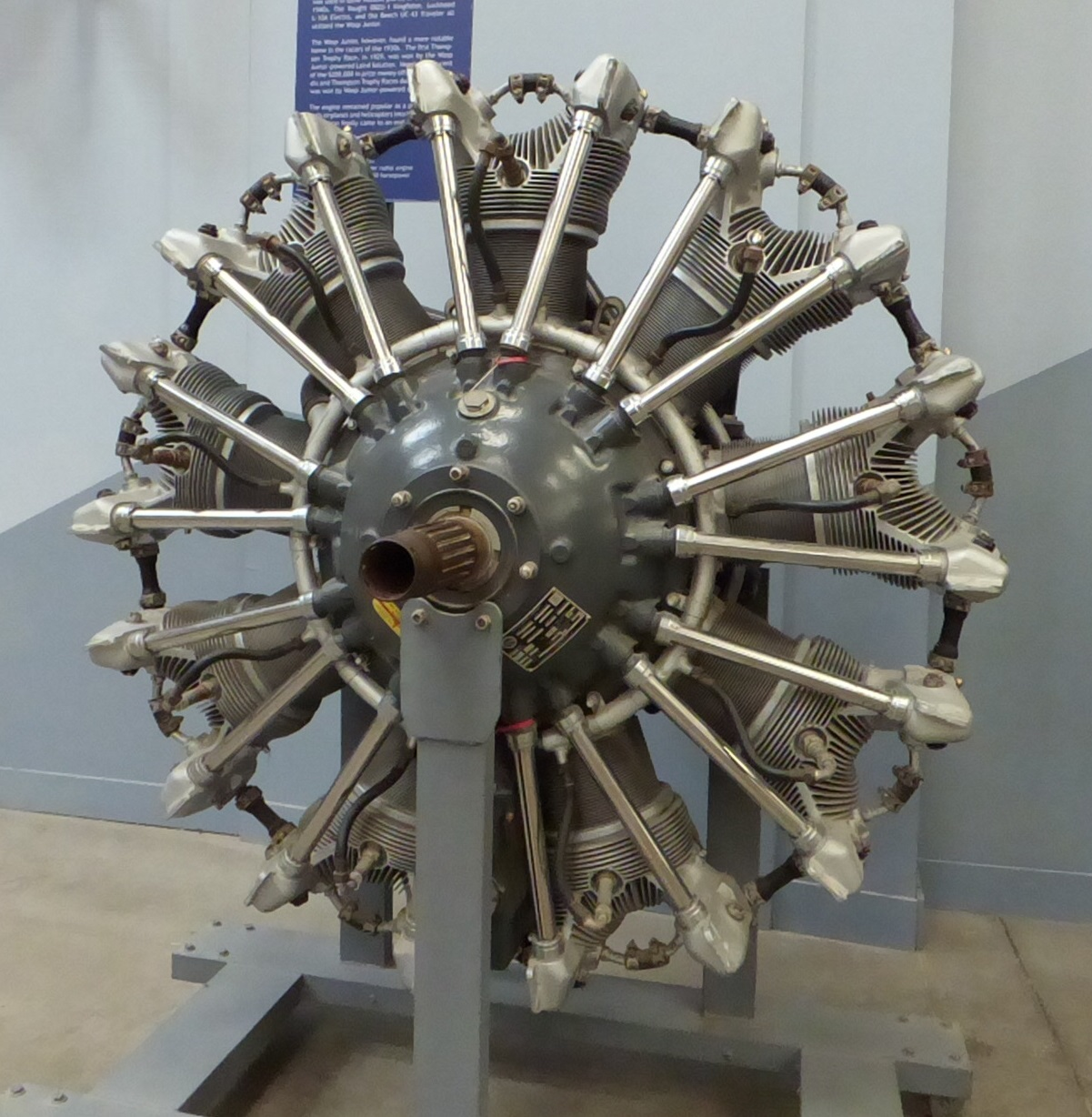
- Pratt & Whitney R-985 at the Pima Air & Space Museum
- Type: Air-cooled 9-cylinder radial piston engine
- National origin: United States
- Manufacturer: Pratt & Whitney
- First run: 1929
- Major applications: Beechcraft Model 17; Beechcraft Model 18; de Havilland Canada DHC-2 Beaver; Grumman G-21 Goose; Sikorsky H-5; Vought OS2U Kingfisher; Vultee BT-13 Valiant
- Manufactured: 1929–1953
- Number built: 39,037
- Developed from: Pratt & Whitney R-1340 Wasp
- Developed into: Pratt & Whitney R-1535 Twin Wasp Junior

The Pratt & Whitney R-985 Wasp Junior is a series of nine-cylinder, air-cooled, radial aircraft engines built by the Pratt & Whitney Aircraft Company from the 1930s to the 1950s. These engines have a displacement of 985 in^{3} (16 L); initial versions produced 300 hp (220 kW), while the most widely used versions produce 450 hp (340 kW).

Wasp Juniors have powered numerous smaller civil and military aircraft, including small transports, utility aircraft, trainers, agricultural aircraft, and helicopters. Over 39,000 engines were built, and many are still in service today.

== Design and development ==
Pratt & Whitney developed the R-985 Wasp Junior as a smaller version of the R-1340 Wasp to compete in the market for medium-sized aircraft engines. Like its larger brother, the Wasp Junior was an air-cooled, nine-cylinder radial, with its power boosted by a gear-driven single-speed centrifugal type supercharger. Its cylinders were smaller, however, with a bore and stroke of 5 3/16 in (132 mm), giving a 27% lesser total displacement. The Wasp Junior used many parts from the Wasp and even had the same mounting dimensions, allowing an aircraft to easily use either the smaller or the larger engine. The first run of the Wasp Junior was in 1929, and sales began in 1930. The initial version, the Wasp Junior A, produced 300 hp (224 kW).

The U.S. military designated the Wasp Junior as the R-985, with various suffixes denoting different military engine models. However, Pratt & Whitney never adopted the R-985 designation scheme for its civilian Wasp Juniors, identifying them simply by name and model (e.g. "Wasp Junior A").

Pratt & Whitney followed the Wasp Junior A with more powerful models in the "A series". These had higher compression ratios, greater rpm limits, and more effective supercharging, and they led to the "B series". The first B series model was the Wasp Junior TB, which could maintain 420 hp (310 kW) at sea level and could reach 440 hp (330 kW) for takeoff. The TB was tuned for best performance at sea level; it was soon joined by the Wasp Junior SB, which was tuned for best performance at altitude and could sustain 400 hp (300 kW) at altitudes up to 5,000 ft (1,500 m), with 450 hp (340 kW) available for takeoff. A still later model, the Wasp Junior T1B2, had improved performance at low level, being able to sustain 450 hp (340 kW) up to 1,500 ft (460 m) while still matching the SB's power at high altitudes. The SB and T1B2, and later versions of these with similar performance, were the most popular Wasp Junior models. One later development of the T1B2, the Wasp Junior B4, was especially designed for vertical mounting in helicopters.

During the mid-1930s, Pratt & Whitney developed a still greater improvement of the Wasp Junior, the "C series", with an even higher compression ratio and rpm limit. The only type produced in this series, the Wasp Junior SC-G, could sustain 525 hp (391 kW) at an altitude of 9,500 ft (2,900 m) and could produce 600 hp (450 kW) for takeoff. It also included reduction gearing to allow the high-revving engine to drive a propeller at suitable speeds, hence the "-G" suffix. Aviator Jacqueline Cochran flew a special Model D-17W Beechcraft Staggerwing with this engine in 1937, setting a speed and altitude record and placing third in the Bendix transcontinental race. However, the SC-G never got past the experimental stage.

== Operational history ==
Early versions of the Wasp Junior were used in various small civilian and military utility aircraft, but only in limited numbers. The type became more popular later in the 1930s. It was selected for the Lockheed Model 10A Electra twin-engined airliner, as well as for other small twin-engined civil transports like the Lockheed Model 12A Electra Junior, the Beechcraft Model 18, and the Grumman Goose amphibious aircraft. It was also used in single-engined civilian utility aircraft like the Beechcraft Staggerwing, the Howard DGA-15, and the Spartan Executive.

As World War II arrived, the U.S. military chose the Wasp Junior for the Vultee BT-13 Valiant and North American BT-14 basic training aircraft and for the Vought OS2U Kingfisher observation floatplane. Military versions of existing Wasp Junior-powered civilian aircraft were also produced, such as the military derivatives of the Beech 18, Beech Staggerwing, Grumman Goose, and Howard DGA-15. The Wasp Junior also powered some versions of the British Avro Anson and Airspeed Oxford twin-engined trainers. The demands of World War II led to the production of many thousands of Wasp Juniors.

Until the end of the war, the Wasp Junior's closest competitor was Wright Aeronautical's R-975 Whirlwind. However, during the war, the Wasp Junior was far more widely used in aircraft than the R-975, and Wright ceased production of the R-975 in 1945.

After World War II, many military-surplus aircraft with Wasp Junior engines entered the civilian market. New designs based on the Wasp Junior were also introduced, such as the Sikorsky H-5 helicopter, the de Havilland Canada DHC-2 Beaver, and Max Holste Broussard bush airplanes, and agricultural aircraft such as the Snow S-2B and S-2C, Grumman Ag Cat, and Weatherley 201.

Pratt & Whitney ceased production of the Wasp Junior in 1953, having built 39,037 engines. Many Wasp Junior engines are still in use today in older bush planes and agricultural planes, as well as in antique aircraft. Some antique aircraft, such as the Boeing-Stearman Model 75, which originally used other engines, have had them replaced with the Wasp Junior to provide more power or for easier maintenance, since parts for the Wasp Junior are readily available.

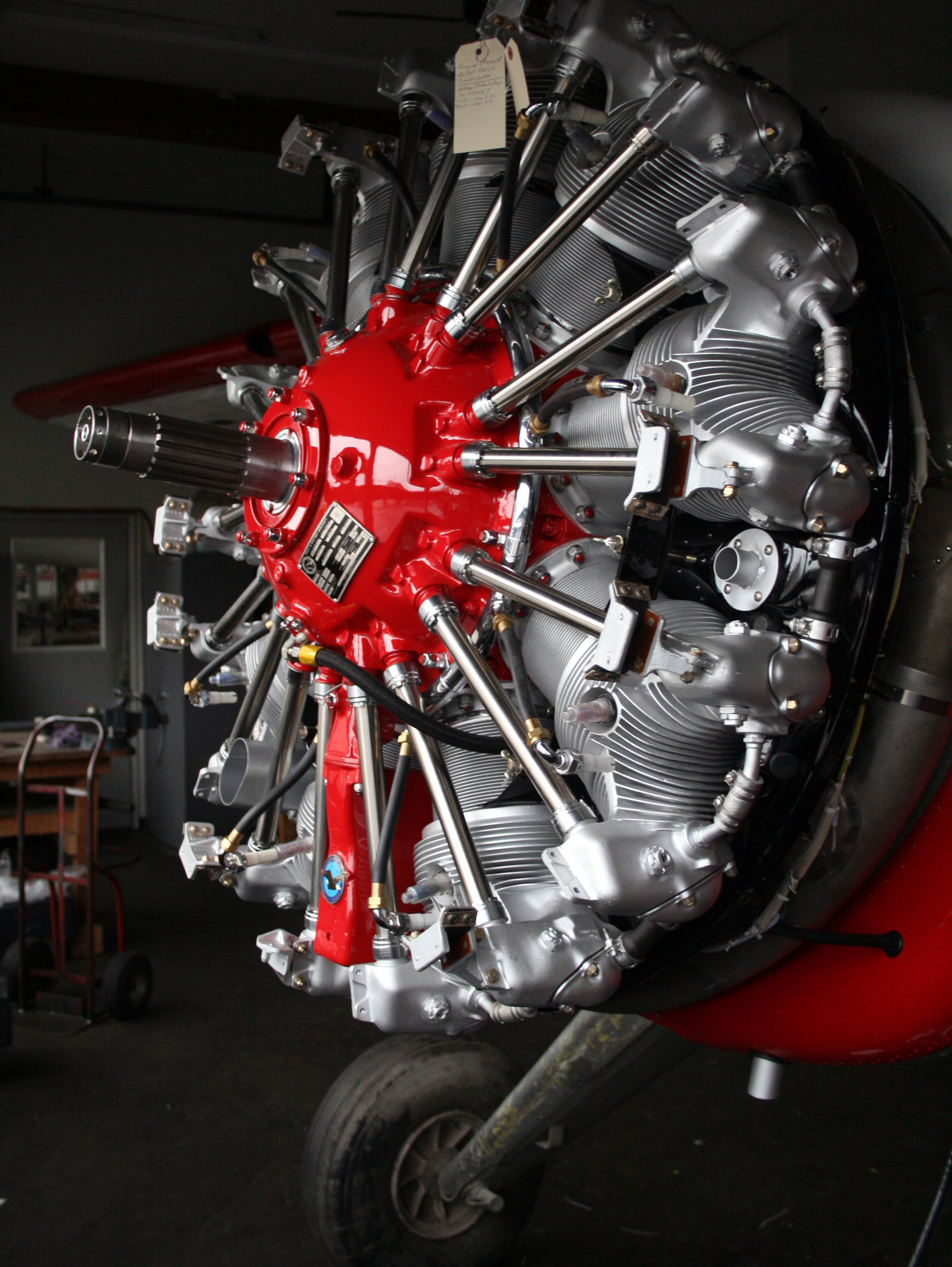
R-985 fitted to a DHC-2 Beaver

== Variants ==
Wasp Junior A
U.S. military version: R-985-1 300 hp (220 kW) at 2,000 rpm at sea level and for takeoff. First production version.
Wasp Junior S2A
Wasp Junior TB, TB2
U.S. military versions: R-985-9, -11, -11A, -21, -46 420 hp (310 kW) at 2,200 rpm at sea level, 440 hp (330 kW) at 2,300 rpm for takeoff. Early B-series versions rated for sea-level performance.
Wasp Junior SB, SB2, SB3
U.S. military versions: R-985-13, -17, -23, -33, -48, -50; R-985-AN-2, -4, -6, -6B, -8, -10, -12, -12B, -14B 400 hp (300 kW) at 2,200 rpm up to 5,000 ft (1,500 m), 450 hp (340 kW) at 2,300 rpm for takeoff. Common B-series versions were rated for performance at altitude.
Wasp Junior T1B2, T1B3
U.S. military versions: R-985-25, -27, -39, -39A; R-985-AN-1, -1A, -3, -3A 450 hp (340 kW) at 2,300 rpm up to 1,500 ft (460 m) and for takeoff. Common B-series versions with improved sea-level performance
Wasp Junior B4
U.S. military versions: R-985-AN-5, -7. 450 hp (340 kW) at 2,300 rpm up to 2,300 ft (700 m) and for takeoff Vertically mounted development of T1B3, for helicopters
Wasp Junior SC-G
525 hp (391 kW) at 2,700 rpm up to 9,500 ft (2,900 m), 600 hp (450 kW) at 2,850 rpm for takeoff Experimental high-powered version with propeller reduction gearing.

== Applications ==
- Airspeed Oxford (AS.46 Oxford V)
- Air Tractor AT-300
- Avro Anson (Mk V)
- Barkley-Grow T8P-1
- Beechcraft Model 18 and military derivatives
- Beechcraft Staggerwing D17S, D17W, G17S
- Bell XV-3
- Bellanca 300-W
- Berliner-Joyce OJ
- Boeing-Stearman Model 75 (in aftermarket conversions)
- Bratukhin G-3
- CAC Winjeel
- de Havilland Canada DHC-2 Beaver and L-20/U-6 military versions
- Douglas C-26 Dolphin
- Fleetwings BT-12
- Gee Bee Model Z
- Griffon Lionheart
- Grumman G-164 Ag Cat (some models)
- Grumman G-21 Goose
- Howard DGA-11
- Howard DGA-15P
- Junkers F13 (Rimowa F13 replica)
- Koolhoven F.K.51 (some models)
- Laird Solution (LC-DW Solution, LC-DW300 Super Solution)
- Lockheed Model 10-A Electra
- Lockheed Model 12-A Electra Junior
- Max Holste MH.1521 Broussard
- McDonnell XHJH Whirlaway
- Naval Aircraft Factory N3N (in aftermarket conversions)
- North American BT-14
- PWS-24bis
- Seversky BT-8
- Sikorsky H-5 helicopter (and S-51 civil version)
- Sikorsky S-39 amphibian
- Snow S-2B and S-2C
- SIAI-Marchetti SM.102
- Spartan Executive 7W
- Stinson Reliant SR-9F and SR-10F
- Vought OS2U Kingfisher
- Vultee BT-13 Valiant
- Waco S3HD
- Waco SRE Aristocrat
- Weatherly 201 series
- Weatherly 620
- Wedell-Williams Model 44

== Engines on display ==
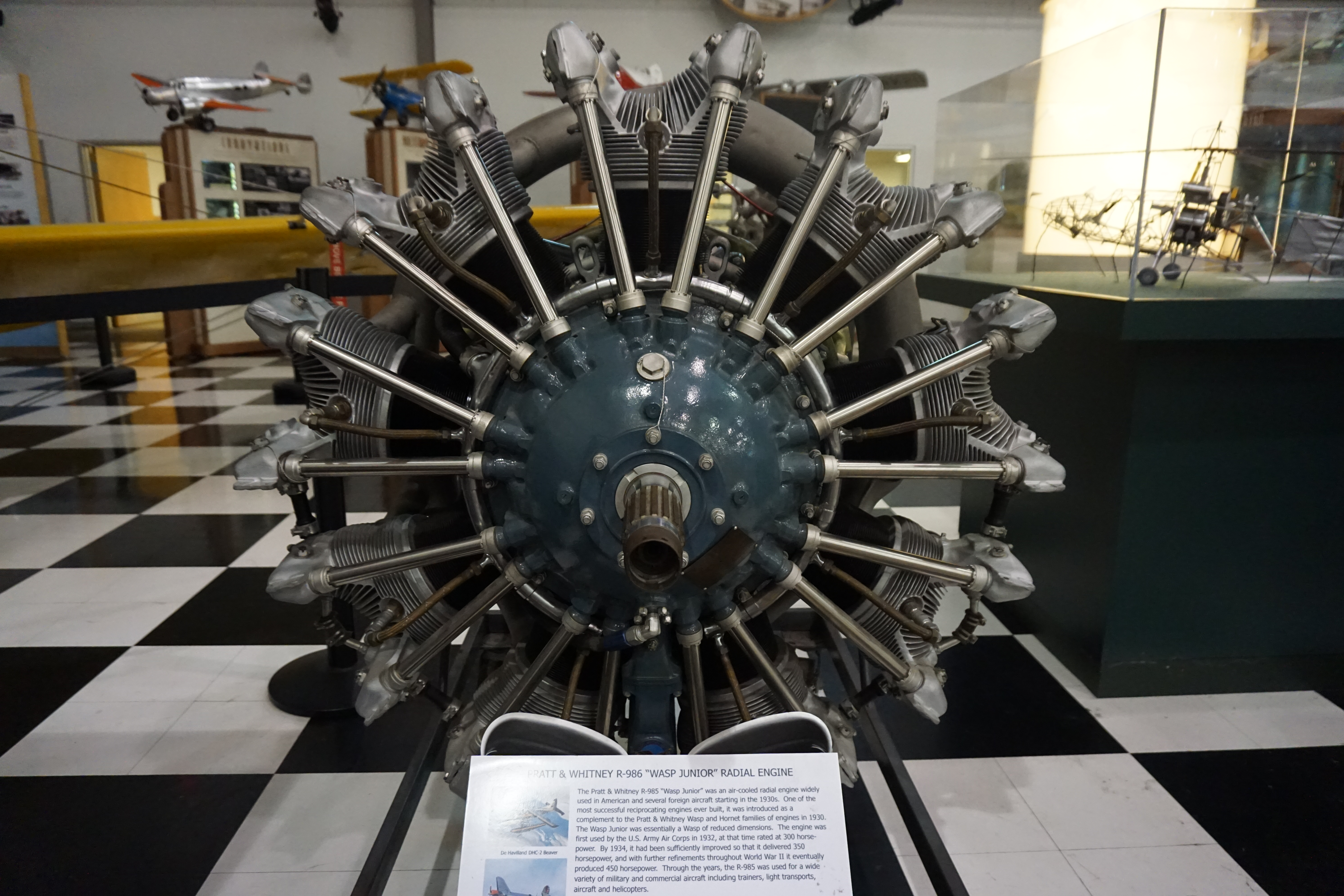
A Pratt & Whitney R-985 Wasp Junior on display at the Frontiers of Flight Museum

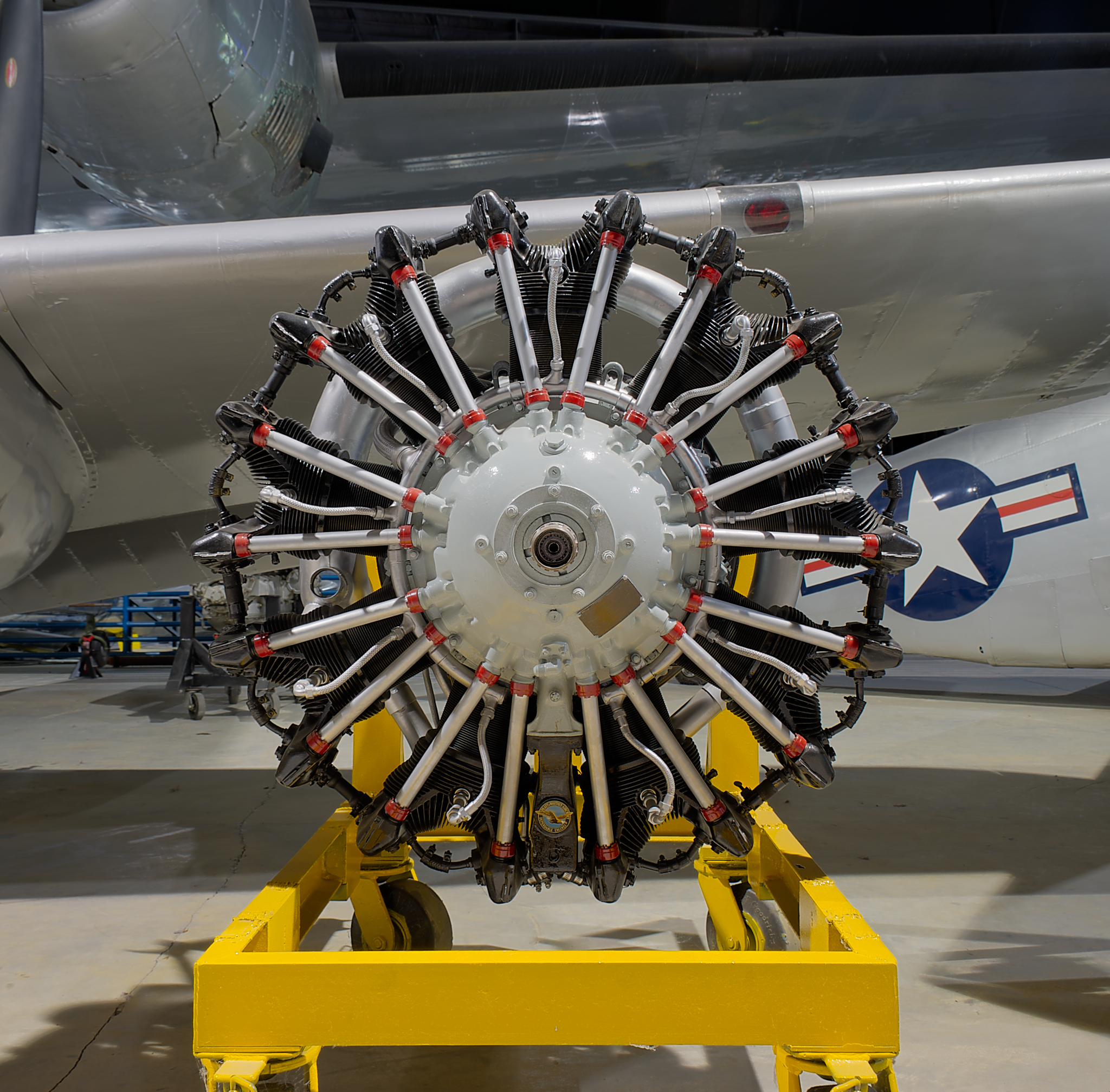
Pratt & Whitney R-985 on display at Museum of Aviation, Robins AFB

Some museums which have Wasp Junior engines on display:

- The National Air and Space Museum's Steven F. Udvar-Hazy Center near Washington Dulles International Airport in Virginia. This engine has been sectioned and motorized for display.
- EAA AirVenture Museum in Oshkosh, Wisconsin.
- Hill Aerospace Museum near Ogden, Utah.
- Museum of Flight in Seattle, Washington.
- National Museum of Naval Aviation near Pensacola, Florida.
- National Museum of the United States Air Force near Dayton, Ohio.
- New England Air Museum in Windsor Locks, Connecticut.
- Pima Air & Space Museum in Tucson, Arizona.
- Southern Museum of Flight in Birmingham, Alabama.
- Strategic Air and Space Museum near Ashland, Nebraska.
- Canada Aviation and Space Museum in Ottawa, Ontario.
- Royal Air Force Museum Cosford, near Wolverhampton, United Kingdom.
- Queensland Air Museum in Caloundra, Queensland.

== Specifications (R-985 Wasp Junior SB) ==
Data from FAA type certificate data sheet for the Wasp Junior SB; dimensions from Pratt & Whitney (1956), p. A2.

=== General characteristics ===
- Type: 9-cylinder supercharged air-cooled radial piston engine
- Bore: 5 3/16 in (132 mm)
- Stroke: 5 3/16 in (132 mm)
- Displacement: 985 in^{3} (16.14 L)
- Length: 41.59 in (1,056 mm)
- Diameter: 45.75 in (1,162 mm)
- Dry weight: 640 lb (290 kg)

=== Components ===
- Valvetrain: Two overhead valves per cylinder, pushrod-actuated
- Supercharger: Single-speed gear-driven General Electric centrifugal supercharger, with impeller driven at 10 times crankshaft speed
- Fuel type: 80/87 grade aviation gasoline
- Reduction gear: Direct drive

=== Performance ===
- Power output: 400 hp (300 kW) at 2,200 rpm up to 5,000 ft (1,500 m); 450 hp (340 kW) at 2,300 rpm for takeoff
- Specific power: 0.406 hp/in³ (18.5 kW/L)
- Compression ratio: 6.0:1
- Power-to-weight ratio: 0.625 hp/lb (1.03 kW/kg)

Specifications for different R-985 Wasp Junior variants
| Engine | Power, continuous | Critical altitude (Note: This is the highest altitude at which the engine can achieve its full continuous power rating. Above this altitude, power falls off with height as with a naturally aspirated engine. See Supercharger#Altitude effects for details.) | Power, takeoff | Compression ratio | Supercharger gear ratio | Octane rating | Dry weight |
|---|---|---|---|---|---|---|---|
| Wasp Jr. A | 300 hp (220 kW) at 2,000 rpm | sea level | same | 5.0:1 | 7:1 | 68 | 565 lb (256 kg) |
| Wasp Jr. TB | 420 hp (310 kW) at 2,200 rpm | sea level | 440 hp (330 kW) at 2,300 rpm | 6.0:1 | 8:1 | 80 | 640 lb (290 kg) |
| Wasp Jr. SB | 400 hp (300 kW) at 2,200 rpm | 5,000 ft (1,500 m) | 450 hp (340 kW) at 2,300 rpm | 6.0:1 | 10:1 | 80/87 | 640 lb (290 kg) |
| Wasp Jr. T1B2 | 450 hp (340 kW) at 2,300 rpm | 1,500 ft (460 m) | same | 6.0:1 | 10:1 | 80/87 | 653 lb (296 kg) |
| Wasp Jr. B4 | 450 hp (340 kW) at 2,300 rpm | 2,300 ft (700 m) | same | 6.0:1 | 10:1 | 80/87 | 684 lb (310 kg) |
| Wasp Jr. SC-G | 525 hp (391 kW) at 2,700 rpm | 9,500 ft (2,900 m) | 600 hp (450 kW) at 2,850 rpm | 6.7:1 | 10:1 | 100 | 864 lb (392 kg) |

== See also ==
- Pratt & Whitney Wasp series

Related development

- Pratt & Whitney R-1340 Wasp
- Pratt & Whitney R-1535 Twin Wasp Junior

Comparable engines

- Alvis Leonides
- Bristol Jupiter
- Wright R-975 Whirlwind

Related lists

- List of aircraft engines
