= Lamson Air Tractor =

Air Tractor

General information
- Type: Agricultural aircraft
- National origin: United States of America
- Manufacturer: Central-Lamson Corporation
- Designer: Robert Lamson
- Number built: 2

History
- First flight: December 10, 1953

The Lamson Air Tractor was a prototype American single-engined biplane agricultural aircraft of the 1950s. Two examples were built, with the first flying in December 1953, but the type did not enter into production.

== Design and development ==
In 1953 Central Aircraft, a crop-spraying company based at Yakima, Washington, went into collaboration with the Lamson Aircraft Company, whose President and designer, Robert L. Lamson was a former test pilot for Boeing, setting up a joint venture, the Central-Lamson Corporation, to design and build a specialized agricultural aircraft, the Air Tractor, one of the first purpose-built aircraft for this role. (Note: Although some sources refer to the Air Tractor as the first purpose-built dedicated agricultural aircraft, the Texas A&M College Ag-1, designed by Fred Weick and an early predecessor of the Piper Pawnee flew on December 1, 1950.) The first prototype Air Tractor, registration N-31237, made its maiden flight on December 10, 1953. It was a single-engined, single-seat biplane of mixed wood and metal construction, with a gulled upper wing to give improved visibility for the pilot, who sat in an open cockpit aft of the trailing edge of the wings. The fuselage was of steel-tube construction, with the structure aft of the pilot's cockpit left uncovered for ease of maintenance. The wings were of fabric-covered wood structure, with all four main wing panels interchangeable, and with fuel tanks installed in the upper wing roots. Large endplates were fitted to the wingtips to give greater lift and better distribution of chemicals. The aircraft was fitted with a fixed tailwheel undercarriage, and was powered by a single Pratt & Whitney Wasp Junior radial engine.

The second Air Tractor, to production standards, flew on December 18, 1954. It had a number of differences from the first prototype, with the rear fuselage fully enclosed and the fuel tanks moved from the wing roots to inside the fuselage, while the engine was enclosed by a cowling. Four more Air Tractors were under construction work but the project was stopped late in 1955. However the design was purchased by Grumman and was later developed into the successful Grumman Ag-Cat.

== Specifications (First prototype) ==
Data from Air Tractor

General characteristics

- Crew: one
- Capacity: 360 Gallon hopper
- Length: 26 ft 5 in (8.05 m)
- Wingspan: 35 ft 7 in (10.85 m)
- Height: 10 ft 8 in (3.25 m)
- Wing area: 350 sq ft (33 m^{2})
- Airfoil: NACA 6515
- Empty weight: 3,200 lb (1,451 kg)
- Gross weight: 5,600 lb (2,540 kg)
- Fuel capacity: 50 US gal (42 imp gal; 190 L)
- Powerplant: 1 × Pratt & Whitney R-985 Wasp Junior 9-cylinder air-cooled radial engine, 450 hp (340 kW)

Performance

- Cruise speed: 100 mph (160 km/h, 87 kn)
- Stall speed: 35 mph (56 km/h, 30 kn)
- Rate of climb: 950 ft/min (4.8 m/s)
