= Hongdu N-5 =

Chinese agricultural aircraft

N-5

General information
- Type: Agricultural aircraft
- National origin: People's Republic of China
- Manufacturer: Hongdu Aviation Industry Group

History
- Introduction date: 1992
- First flight: 26 December 1989

The Hongdu N-5, (N-5 - Nongye-Feiji-5 - agricultural aircraft-5), originally known as the Nanchang N-5, is a Chinese agricultural aircraft. First flown in 1989, and entering into production in 1992, the N-5 is a single-engined low-wing monoplane, and is available in versions powered by a piston engine or a turboprop.

== Development and design ==
In November 1987, the Nanchang Aircraft Manufacturing Company (which was renamed the Hongdu Aviation Industry Group in 1998) began design of a modern, purpose designed agricultural aircraft, with the intention of replacing some of the large numbers of license-built Antonov An-2s in use for that purpose in China. The resulting design, the N-5 first flew on 26 December 1989. It is a single-engined monoplane of conventional layout for an agricultural aircraft with a low-wing situated ahead of the cockpit. It is of all-metal construction, except for a glassfibre hopper for chemicals ahead of the cockpit, which is sealed and pressurised to protect the crew during spraying operations, and has an undercarriage. It is flown by a single pilot, with a tandem jump-seat provided to allow a mechanic to be carried. It is powered by a single Lycoming O-720 eight-cylinder piston engine, and was certified as airworthy in this form by the Civil Aviation Administration of China on 12 August 1992. The N-5A was certified by the Federal Aviation Administration for use in the United States on 26 February 2007.

In response to demands from Chinese operators for a more powerful aircraft, studies were made of versions powered both by more powerful piston and turboprop engines, before settling on a Czech Walter M601 turboprop to produce the N-5B, this variant replacing the nosewheel undercarriage of the N-5A with a tailwheel undercarriage. The N-5B first flew on 28 December 2006.

== Variants ==
N-5A
Main production version, with nosewheel undercarriage and 298 kW (400 hp) Lycoming IO-720 piston engine.
N-5B
Version powered by 580 kW (777 hp) Walter M601F turboprop engine. Tailwheel undercarriage.

== Specifications (N-5A) ==
Data from Jane's All The World's Aircraft 1993-4

General characteristics

- Crew: 2 (pilot and loader/mechanic)
- Capacity: 1.2 m^{3} capacity hopper, 960 kg (2,116 lb) powdered or liquid chemicals
- Length: 10.487 m (34 ft 5 in)
- Wingspan: 13.418 m (44 ft 0 in)
- Height: 3.733 m (12 ft 3 in)
- Wing area: 26.0 m^{2} (280 sq ft)
- Aspect ratio: 6.80
- Airfoil: LS(1)-0417 Mod
- Empty weight: 1,328 kg (2,928 lb)
- Gross weight: 2,250 kg (4,960 lb) (normal max take-off weight)
- Max takeoff weight: 2,450 kg (5,401 lb) (overload)
- Fuel capacity: 315 L (83.2 US Gal) in wing tanks
- Powerplant: 1 × Textron Lycoming IO-720-D1B air-cooled flat-8 piston engine, 300 kW (400 hp)

Performance

- Maximum speed: 205 km/h (127 mph, 111 kn) (with dispersal equipment)
- Cruise speed: 170 km/h (110 mph, 92 kn)
- Stall speed: 86 km/h (53 mph, 46 kn) (flaps down)
- Range: 250 km (160 mi, 130 nmi)
- Ferry range: 979 km (608 mi, 529 nmi)
- Endurance: 1.94 hr
- Service ceiling: 3,750 m (12,300 ft)
- Rate of climb: 4.28 m/s (843 ft/min)

== See also ==
Aircraft of comparable role, configuration, and era

- Ayres Thrush
- CallAir A-9
- Grumman G-164 Ag Cat
- Piper PA-25 Pawnee
- Piper PA-36 Pawnee Brave
