= Larson D-1 =

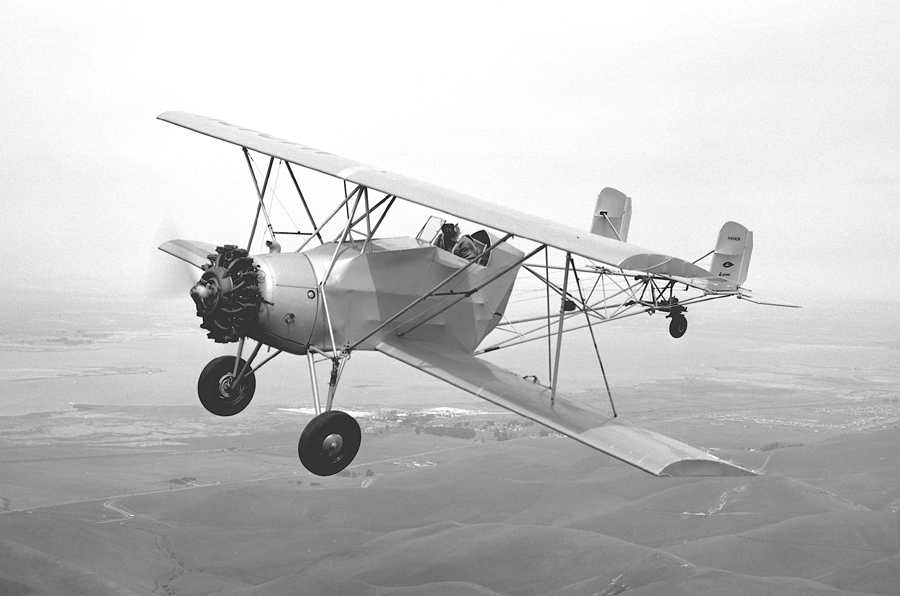

General information
- Type: Agricultural aircraft
- National origin: United States
- Manufacturer: Larson Aero Development
- Designer: Merle Larson

History
- First flight: 1955

The Larson D-1 was an agricultural biplane that was purpose-built to replace Boeing Stearman cropdusters.

== Development ==
In 1955, Merle Larson designed the D-1 with updated features to improve cropdusting compared to the popular Boeing Stearman in use at the time. The aircraft used only 25 percent of the number of parts as a Stearman.

== Design ==
The biplane featured a steel tube fuselage, and aluminum covered wings. The fuselage was fabric covered only to behind the cockpit, leaving the rest of the tail structure exposed, preventing dust buildup in the tail. The aircraft had twin rudders mounted outboard of the spray trail. Each of these were all-moving with anti-servo tabs. Standard automotive wheels and tires were employed to reduce cost as low-cost World War II surplus was becoming too old, and new aviation tires cost nearly five times as much.

== Specifications (Larson D-1) ==
Data from Jane's All the World's Aircraft 1958-59

General characteristics

- Crew: 1
- Length: 25 ft (7.6 m)
- Upper wingspan: 30 ft 0 in (9.14 m)
- Lower wingspan: 33 ft 0 in (10.06 m)
- Height: 11 ft 00 in (3.35 m)
- Wing area: 315 sq ft (29.3 m^{2})
- Aspect ratio: 6
- Airfoil: Göttingen 365
- Empty weight: 1,700 lb (771 kg)
- Gross weight: 3,600 lb (1,633 kg)
- Fuel capacity: 30 US gal (25 imp gal; 114 L) fuel; 4.4 US gal (3.7 imp gal; 16.7 L)
- Powerplant: 1 × Lycoming R-680 9-cylinder air-cooled radial piston engine, 225 hp (168 kW)

or 220 hp (164 kW) Continental R-670 7-cylinder radial
or 245 hp (183 kW) Jacobs R-755 7-cylinder radial

- Propellers: 2-bladed McCauley ground-adjustable propeller

Performance

- Cruise speed: 90 mph (140 km/h, 78 kn) at sea level
- Landing speed: 40 mph (35 kn; 64 km/h)
- Stall speed: 40 mph (64 km/h, 35 kn)
- Rate of climb: 1,400 ft/min (7.1 m/s) at sea level, empty
- Wing loading: 11.4 lb/sq ft (56 kg/m^{2})
- Take-off run, empty, nil wind: <200 ft (61 m)
- Take-off run, 1,000 lb (454 kg) payload, nil wind: 600 ft (183 m)

== See also ==
- American Airmotive NA-75
- Grumman Ag Cat
- Lamson Air Tractor
