= Embraer EMB 202 Ipanema =

Family of agricultural aircraft

EMB 202 Ipanema
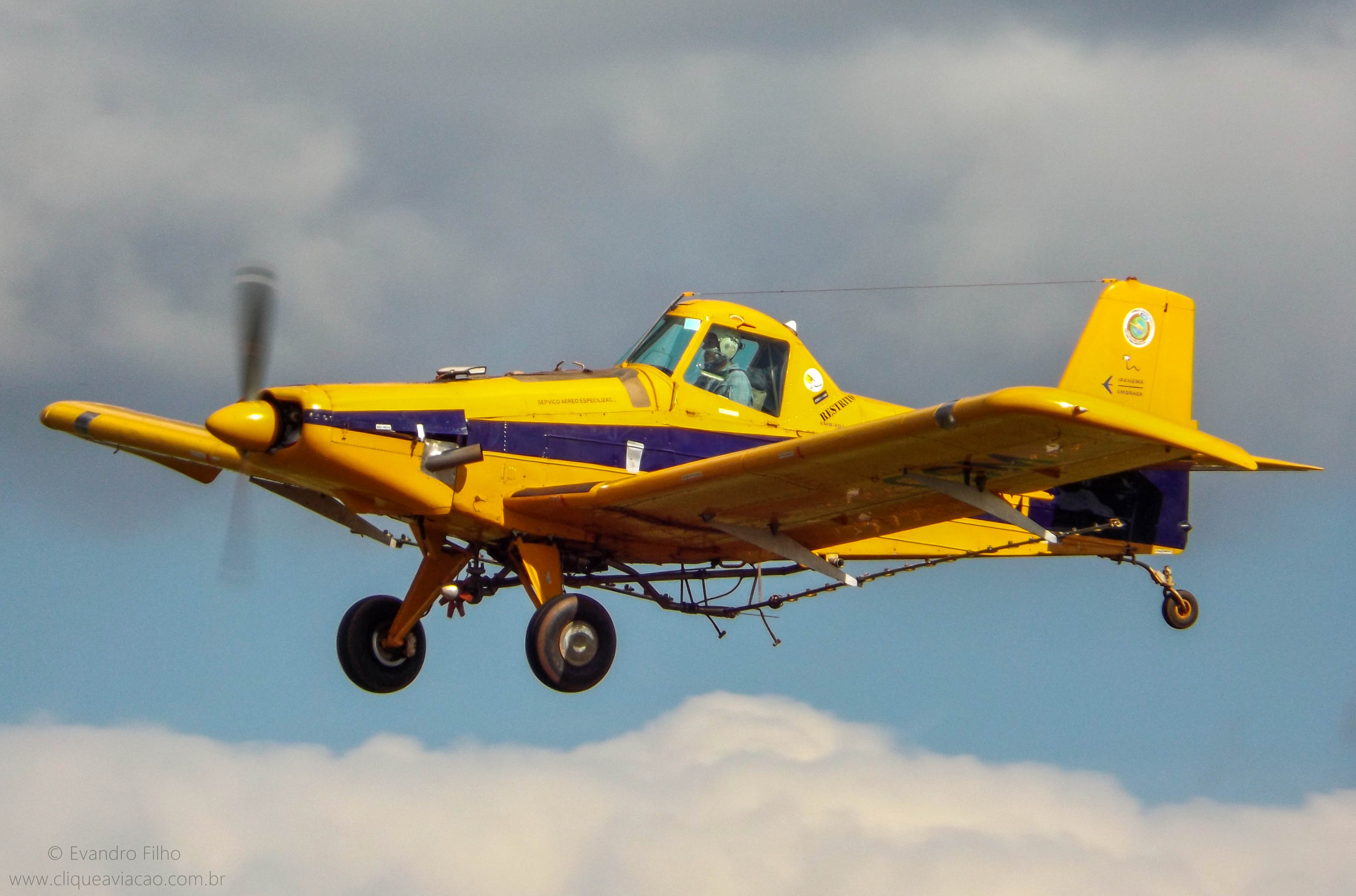

General information
- Type: Agricultural aircraft
- National origin: Brazil
- Manufacturer: Embraer
- Status: Active
- Number built: 1700 as of 2025

History
- Manufactured: 1969-present
- Introduction date: December, 1971
- First flight: 30 July 1970

The Embraer EMB 202 Ipanema is a Brazilian agricultural aircraft used for aerial application, particularly crop dusting. It is produced by Indústria Aeronáutica Neiva, a subsidiary of Embraer located in Botucatu, Brazil. The latest version of this aircraft is the first ethanol-powered fixed-wing aircraft, which could give it an economical advantage over the gasoline version. The aircraft is widely employed in Brazil, having market share of about 80%, and the 1,700th delivery was completed on 24 November 2025. Besides aircraft, alcohol-conversion kits for gasoline-powered Ipanemas are also sold.

== Development ==
In the 1960s, the development of a Brazilian agriculture aircraft was motivated by the expansion of the agricultural products market, specifically soybean and sugar cane. During this time, the Ipanema aircraft was developed by engineers of the Aeronautics Technological Institute (ITA) on the Ipanema Farm, located in Sorocaba.

The first version of the aircraft, the EMB-200, made its first flight on 30 July 1970 and was certified on 14 December 1971. The aircraft was equipped with a 260 hp (190 kW) piston engine. Series production started in 1972 by Embraer. In September 1974, the EMB-201 was introduced, including many improvements such as a 300 hp (220 kW) engine, new propeller, new wings and increased capacity.

In 1982, the production of Ipanema was transferred to Indústria Aeronáutica Neiva, recently acquired by Embraer. In 1992, a new model, called EMB-202 or Ipanemão (big Ipanema), was released. The new aircraft had improvements on aerodynamics, a 40% greater capacity, and optional, modern equipment for electrostatic aerial application.

In the following years, Neiva made significant improvements to the aircraft, such as adding winglets to the wingtips, adding an air conditioning system to the cabin, lowering the position of the wings, decreasing resistance and reducing the weight of the exhaust system.

Since ethanol is largely available in Brazil, costing only about 25-30% as much as aviation gasoline, many Brazilian farmers have attempted to fuel gasoline-powered Ipanemas with alcohol, with varying degrees of success. The result of this was the development of an alcohol-powered Ipanema, which was certified by the Brazilian General Command for Aerospace Technology (CTA) on 19 October 2004. The alcohol-fueled Ipanema engine also has 20% lower maintenance and operational costs.

In 2015, an Ipanema with improved winglets was presented on the Agrishow agricultural exposition. The new winglets, designed by the department of Aeronautical Engineering of the University of São Paulo's São Carlos School of Engineering, increased the performance of the aircraft by 20%.

== Variants ==
In parentheses are shown certification dates.

- EMB-200 (December 1971) with a 260 HP Lycoming engine, Mc Cauley propeller and 550 kg capacity.
- EMB-200A (December 1973) similar to EMB-200 with Hartzell propeller and an improved engine.
- EMB-201 (September 1974) with 300 hp (220 kW) Lycoming IO-540-K1D5 engine and 800 kg (1,800 lb) capacity, plus improved aerodynamics. 200 built.
- EMB-201A (April 1977) similar to EMB-201 with new wing profile and wingtips and revised cockpit.
- EMB-201R Single-seat glider-tug aircraft for the Brazilian Air Force. Three were built for the Air Force Academy gliding club. Brazilian Air Force designation U-19.
- EMB-202 (May 1991) with 300 HP Lycoming engine, Hartzell propeller and 950 kg capacity.
- EMB-202A (October 2004) with 320 HP Lycoming engine, using ethanol fuel and a propeller with better performance, lower maintenance and lower operational costs.
- EMB-203 (November 2015) with 320 HP Lycoming engine, certificate in 2015, has a wingspan of 13.3 m and its winglets redesigned, increasing control and improving the efficiency of spraying.

== Operators ==
Brazil

- Brazilian Air Force

== Specifications (EMB-202) ==
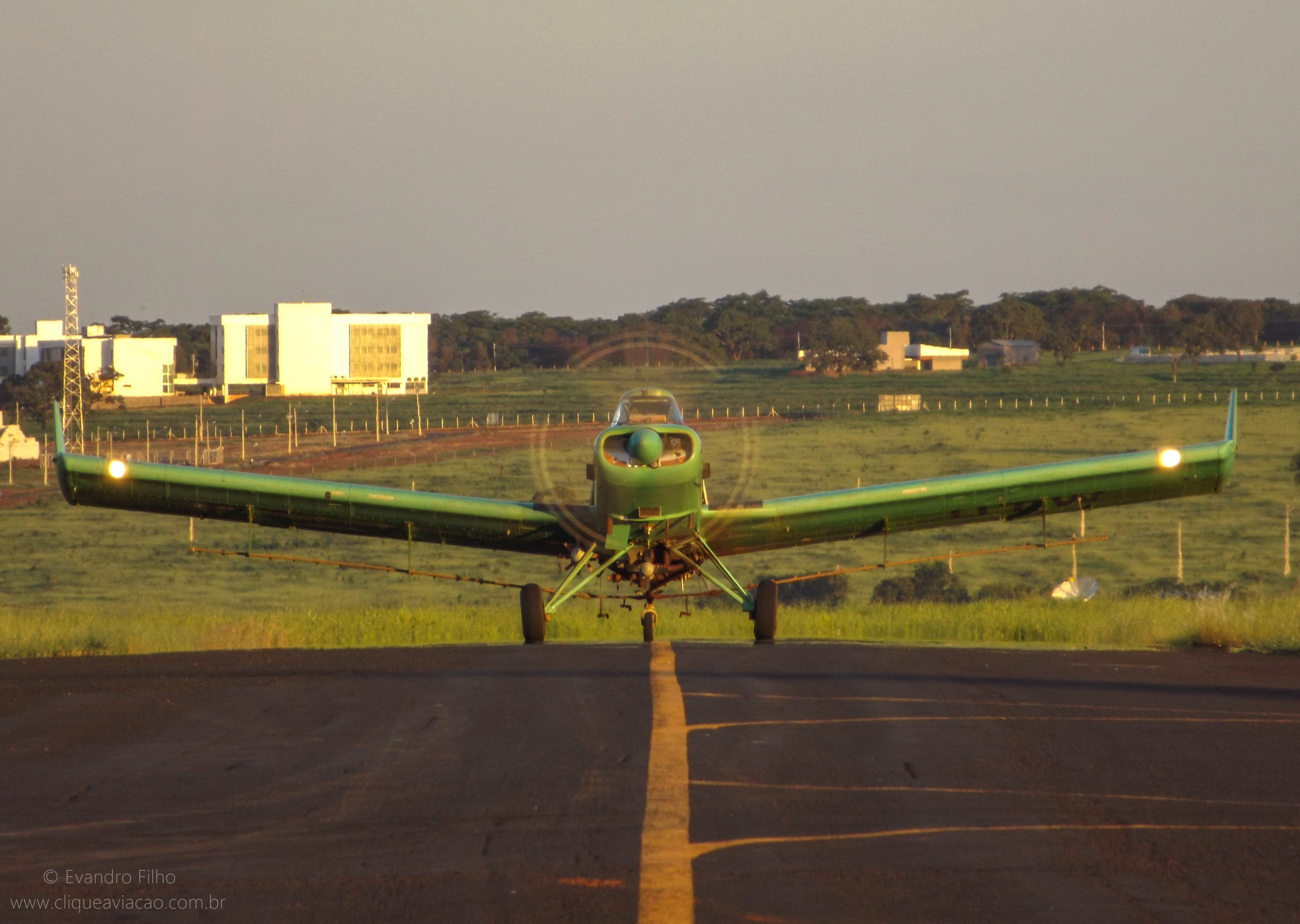
Embraer 202A Ipanema

Data from Jane's All The World's Aircraft 2003–2004

General characteristics

- Crew: 1 pilot
- Capacity: 950 L (250 US gal; 210 imp gal) liquid or 750 kg (1,650 lb) dry chemicals
- Length: 7.43 m (24 ft 5 in) (tail up)
- Wingspan: 11.69 m (38 ft 4 in)
- Height: 2.20 m (7 ft 3 in) (tail down)
- Wing area: 19.94 m^{2} (214.6 sq ft)
- Aspect ratio: 6.9:1
- Empty weight: 1,020 kg (2,249 lb)
- Max takeoff weight: 1,800 kg (3,968 lb) (restricted category)
- Fuel capacity: 264 L (70 US gal; 58 imp gal) usable fuel
- Powerplant: 1 × Textron Lycoming IO-540-K1J5D air-cooled flat-six, 224 kW (300 hp)

Performance

- Maximum speed: 230 km/h (140 mph, 120 kn)
- Cruise speed: 213 km/h (132 mph, 115 kn) (75% power)
- Stall speed: 92 km/h (57 mph, 50 kn) (power off)
- Never exceed speed: 272 km/h (169 mph, 147 kn)
- Range: 938 km (583 mi, 506 nmi)
- Service ceiling: 3,470 m (11,380 ft)
- Rate of climb: 4.7 m/s (930 ft/min)
- Take-off run to 15 m (50 ft): 332 metres (1,089 ft)
- Landing run from 15 m (50 ft): 412 metres (1,352 ft)

== See also ==
Aircraft of comparable role, configuration, and era

- Ayres Thrush
- CallAir A-9
- Cessna 188
- Fletcher FU-24
- Grumman Ag Cat
- Hongdu N-5
- Piper PA-25 Pawnee
- Piper PA-36 Pawnee Brave
- PZL-106 Kruk
- PZL-Mielec M-18 Dromader
