= Aermacchi AL-60 =

American civilian utility aircraft

LASA-60 / AL-60 / C4M Kudu
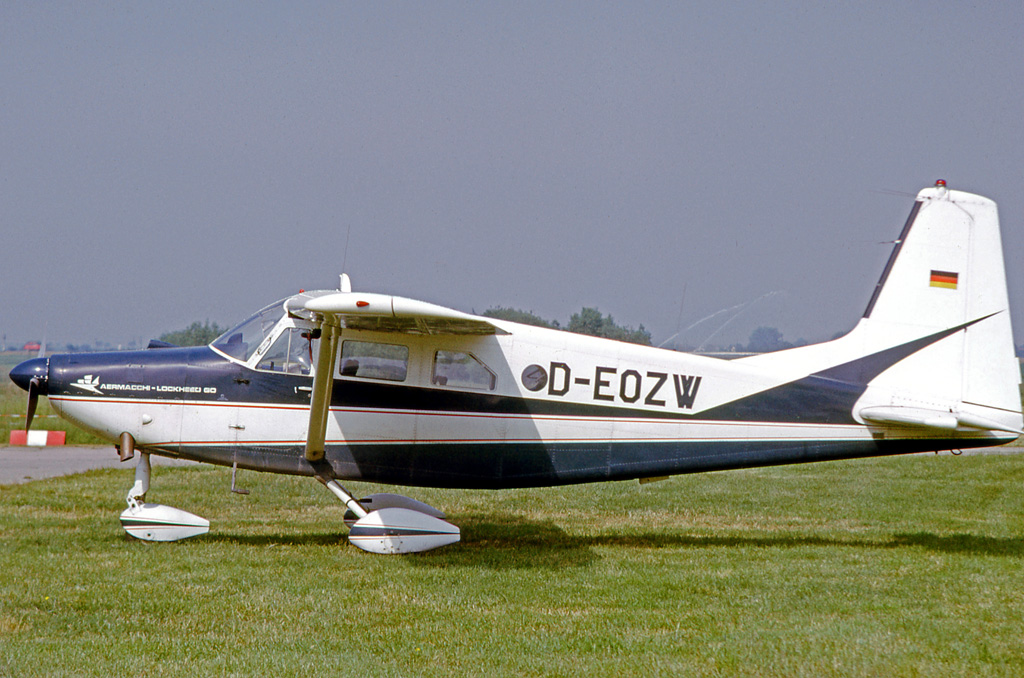
- Operational Aermacchi AL-60B-2 registered in Germany

General information
- Type: Utility aircraft
- Manufacturer: Lockheed Corporation
- Designer: Al Mooney
- Built by: Lockheed-Azcarate; Aermacchi; Atlas Aircraft Corporation
- Status: Retired
- Primary users: Mexican Air Force South African Air Force
- Number built: ~180

History
- Manufactured: 1974-1979 South Africa
- First flight: 15 September 1959
- Variant: Northwest Ranger

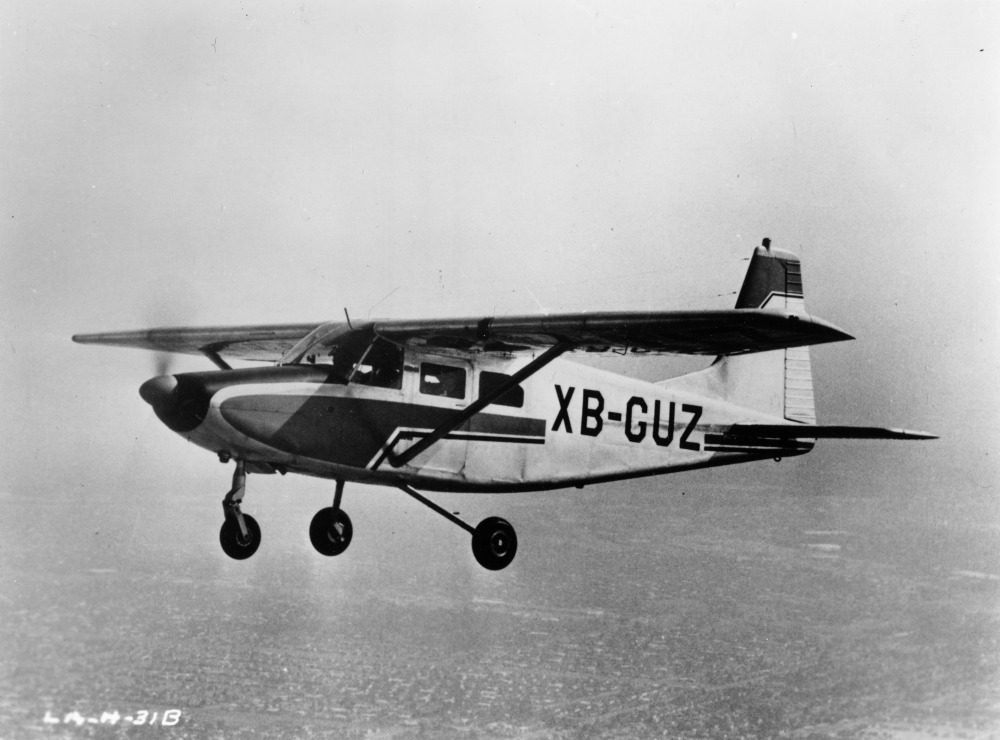
Lockheed-Azacárate LASA 60

The Aermacchi AL-60 is a light civil utility aircraft of the late 1950s and early 1960s, originally designed by Al Mooney of Lockheed in the United States. After the company decided not to build the aircraft in the US, it was manufactured in small quantities in Mexico, and a few were assembled in Argentina (Santa Isabel, Córdoba) by Aviones Lockheed-Kaiser Argentina. It was also built in quantity under licence by Aermacchi in Italy and Atlas Aircraft Corporation in South Africa.

== Design and development ==
In the late 1950s, the American aircraft designer Al Mooney, who had recently joined Lockheed after leaving the company that bore his name, was given the task of designing a utility aircraft, the CL-402, suitable for use in underdeveloped countries. As Lockheed could not build the design at an economic price in the United States, it was instead intended for the aircraft to be built under licence outside the United States, where labour costs were lower. The first prototype CL-402, powered by a 250 hp (190 kW) Continental IO-470-G engine, flew for the first time at Lockheed's Marietta, Georgia on 15 September 1959, with a second prototype, powered by a turbocharged TSIO-470-B engine rated at 260 hp (190 kW) followed a few months later.

The initial production deal was made with Mexico, where a joint venture, Lockheed-Azcarate SA (LASA) was set up to build the CL-402 as the LASA-60, with a factory being built near San Luis Potosí. Type certification by the US Federal Aviation Administration was received on 5 April 1960. While it was planned that 240 aircraft would be built by LASA by 1963, the type was less popular than hoped, with LASA stopping production in April 1962. LASA built 41 LASA-60s, with 18 aircraft purchased by the Mexican Air Force.

A second joint venture was set up with Argentina, between Lockheed and Industrias Kaiser Argentina, with the name Aviones Lockheed-Kaiser. Production began of a batch of 16 aircraft in 1961, but was stopped after 11 had been completed.

In Italy, Aermacchi purchased a licence to produce the type, first in its original configuration as the AL-60B, then in a modified version for various African customers as the AL-60C. This latter version changed from the original tricycle undercarriage to a taildragger arrangement.

The AL-60C version was built under license by Atlas Aircraft Corporation in South Africa. This aircraft was known as Atlas C4M Kudu. Over 40 aircraft were built and served the South African Air Force between 1974 and 1991.

A number of C4M Kudu aircraft are still flying privately and have proven well in the role of skydive release aircraft. They have been re-engined with turbine engines. This design is known as the Atlas Angel or Turbine Kudu.

In 1968 Macchi sold the rights to the aircraft to Northwest Industries of Edmonton, Alberta, Canada and the design was developed into the Northwest Ranger, with development continuing until 1972.

== Variants ==
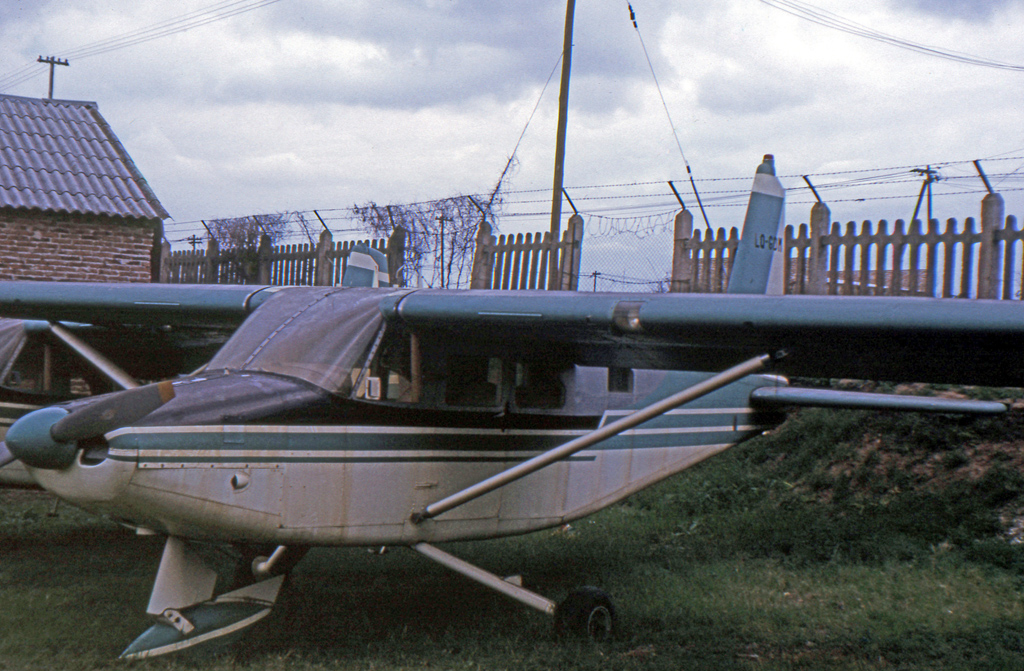
Kaiser-built L-402 at Don Torcuato near Buenos Aires in 1972

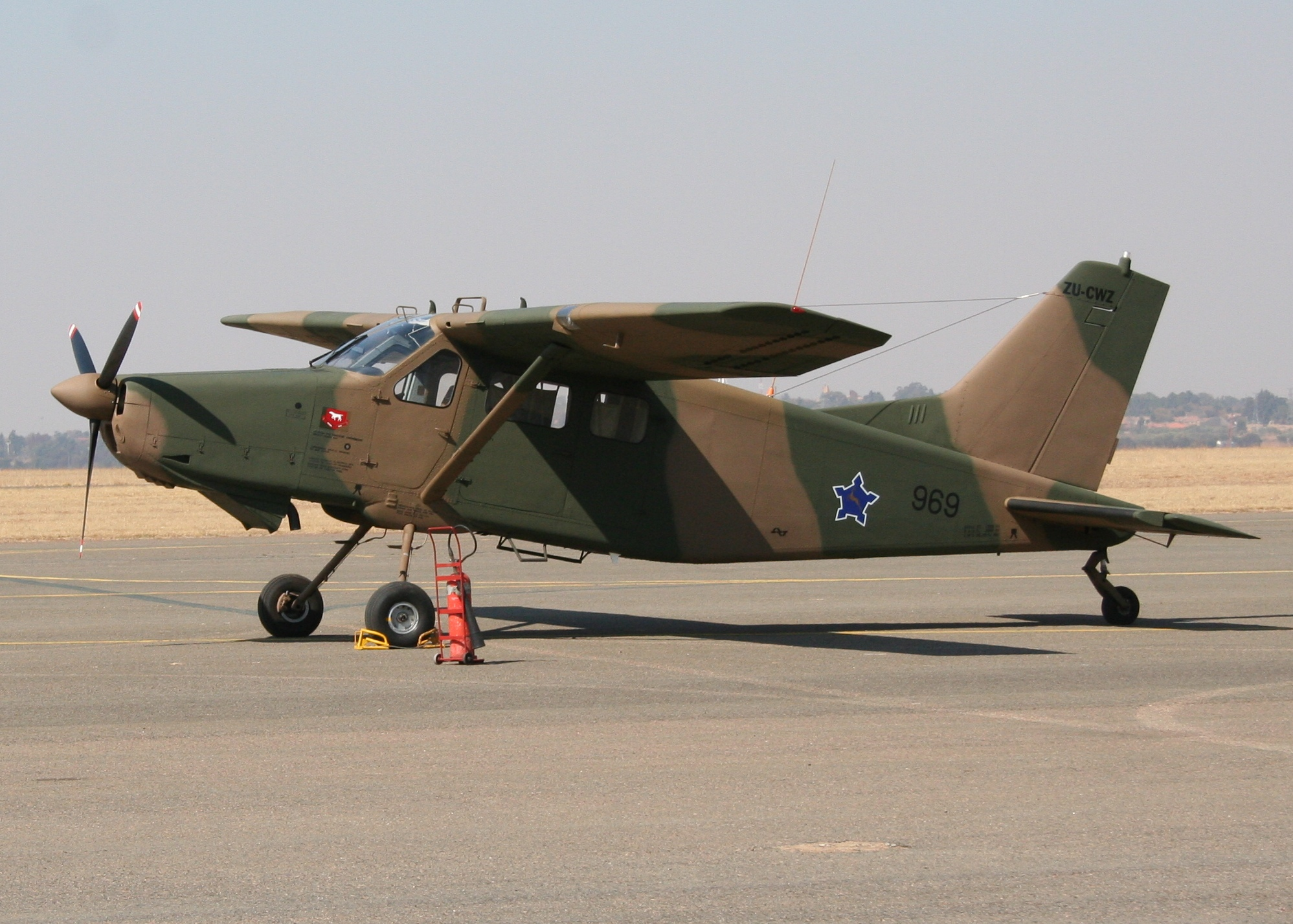
An Atlas C4M Kudu at the South African Air Force Museum

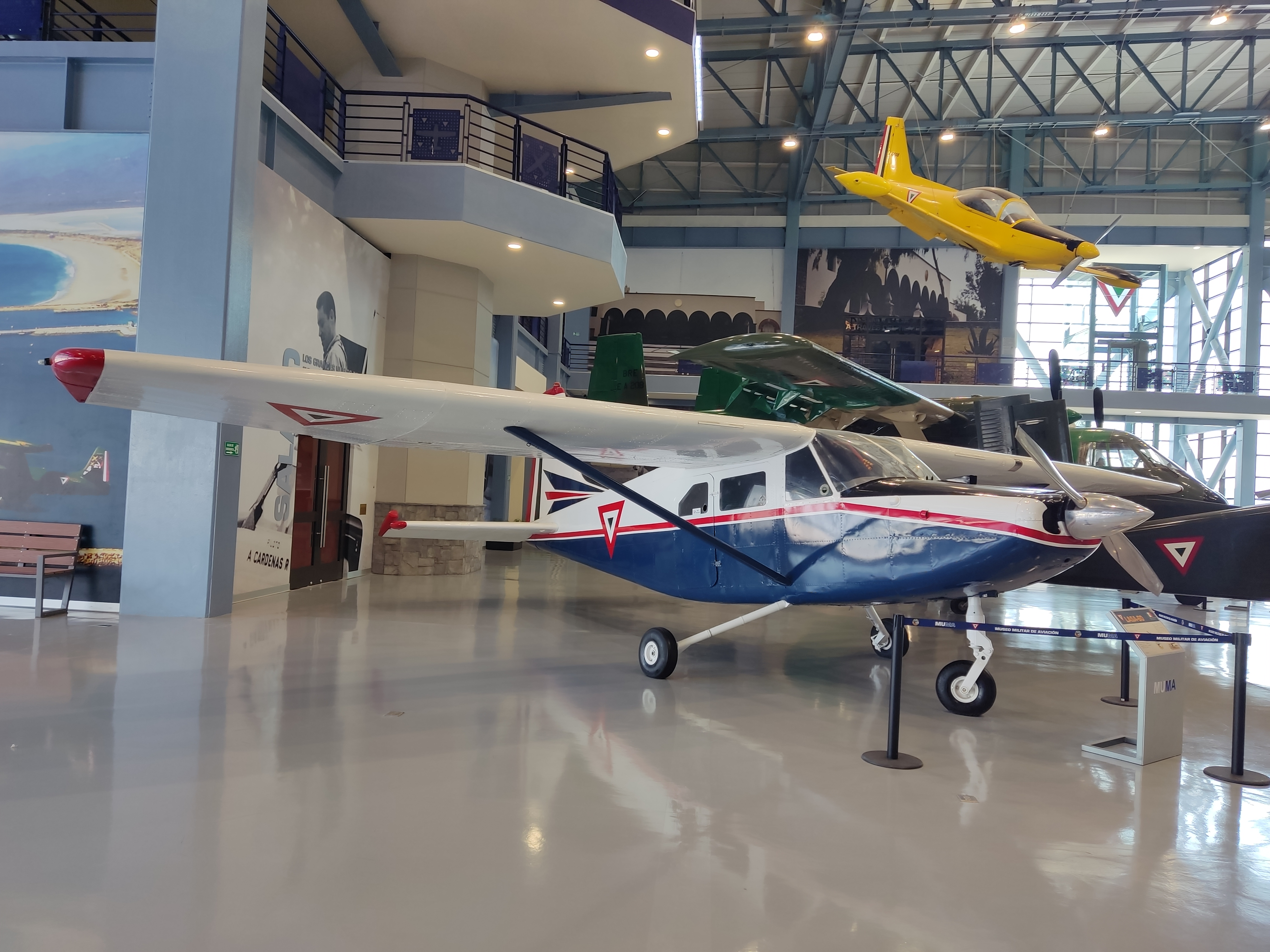
Lockheed-Azcárate LASA-60 at the Mexican Air Force Museum.

CL-402
Lockheed prototypes powered by a turbocharged 260 hp (194 kW) Continental TSIO-470-B engine.
CL-402-2
As CL-402 but powered by a 250 hp (186 kW) Continental IO-470-R engine.
LASA-60
CL-402 and CL-402-2 built by Lockheed-Azcarate in Mexico. 44 built. Production in Argentina by Lockheed-Kaiser was canceled.
AL-60B-1 Santa Maria
Original Aermacchi-built version with tricycle landing gear and powered by a 250 hp (186 kW) Continental IO-470-R engine. Four built.
AL-60B-2 Santa Mari
Production Aermacchi version tricycle landing gear and powered by a turbocharged 260 hp (194 kW) Continental TSIO-470-B. 81 built.
AL-60C-4
Version with conventional landing gear, a separate pilot's door, a larger vertical stabilizer, and powered by a geared 340 hp (254 kW) Lycoming GSO-480-B1 engine. One prototype built.
AL-60C-4M Kudu
Built by Atlas for the South African Air Force with a geared 340 hp (254 kW) Lycoming GSO-480-B1B3 engine. 43 total built; three prototypes and 40 production aircraft.
AL-60C-5 Conestoga
Production version of the AL-60C-4 with a strengthened airframe and powered by a 400 hp (298 kW) Lycoming IO-720-A1A engine. 13 built.
AL-60D-3
As AL-60B-2 but powered by a geared Continental GIO-470-R. One built.
AL-60F-5 Trojan
As AL-60C-5 but with tricycle landing gear. One built.

== Operators ==
Central African Republic

- Central African Republic Air Force

Italy

- Italian Air Force operated one Aermacchi AL-60 from 1962 until 1963

Mexico

- Mexican Air Force

Mauritania

- Military of Mauritania

Rhodesia

- Rhodesian Air Force

South Africa

- South African Air Force

Tunisia
Zimbabwe

- Air Force of Zimbabwe

== Specifications (AL-60B2) ==
Data from Jane's All The World's Aircraft 1966–67

General characteristics

- Crew: One
- Capacity: 6-8 passengers / 602 kg (1,327 lb) max. payload
- Length: 8.79 m (28 ft 10 in)
- Wingspan: 11.84 m (38 ft 10 in)
- Height: 3.25 m (10 ft 8 in)
- Wing area: 19.54 m^{2} (210.3 sq ft)
- Aspect ratio: 7.2:1
- Airfoil: root: NACA 23016; tip: NACA 4412
- Empty weight: 998 kg (2,200 lb)
- Max takeoff weight: 1,746 kg (3,849 lb)
- Fuel capacity: 322 L (85 US gal; 71 imp gal) in six wing tanks
- Powerplant: 1 × Continental TSIO-470-B-A1A 6-cylinder air-cooled horizontally-opposed piston engine, 190 kW (260 hp)
- Propellers: 3-bladed constant speed propeller

Performance

- Maximum speed: 238 km/h (148 mph, 129 kn) at sea level

270 km/h (170 mph; 150 kn) at 4,800 m (15,700 ft)

- Cruise speed: 220 km/h (140 mph, 120 kn) maximum at 75% power

206 km/h (128 mph; 111 kn) at 3,000 m (9,800 ft) at 63% power

- Stall speed: 87 km/h (54 mph, 47 kn) flaps down
- Never exceed speed: 283 km/h (176 mph, 153 kn)
- Range: 885 km (550 mi, 478 nmi) with max. fuel
- Service ceiling: 6,700 m (22,000 ft)
- Rate of climb: 4.267 m/s (840.0 ft/min)
- Take-off run: 189 m (620 ft)
- Landing run: 183 m (600 ft)
- Take-off run to 15 m (49 ft): 320 m (1,050 ft)
- Landing run from 15 m (49 ft): 318 m (1,043 ft)

== See also ==
Related development

- Northwest Ranger

Aircraft of comparable role, configuration, and era

- Cessna 185
