= PA36 =

PA36 may refer to:

- Pennsylvania's 36th congressional district, a congressional district in Pennsylvania
- Pennsylvania Route 36, a state route in Pennsylvania
- Piper PA-36 Pawnee Brave, an agricultural aircraft made by Piper Aircraft
- Pitcairn PA-36, an autogyro manufactured by the Pitcairn Aircraft Company
