= Northwest Ranger =

Canadian light airplane

Ranger
- The prototype Northwest Ranger

General information
- Type: Light aircraft
- National origin: Canada
- Manufacturer: Northwest Industries
- Status: Probably prototypes only
- Number built: At least four

History
- Manufactured: 1968-1972
- Introduction date: 1968
- Developed from: Aermacchi AL-60

The Northwest Ranger was a Canadian bush aircraft that was under development by Northwest Industries (NWI) of Edmonton, Alberta between 1968 and 1972. The aircraft was a type certified design, and intended to be supplied as a complete ready-to-fly-aircraft.

== Design and development ==
The Ranger was a development of the Aermacchi AL-60, which itself was based upon the Lockheed Model 60. NWI established its reputation as an aircraft overhauler and maintenance facility, but decided to enter the aircraft manufacturing business by buying the rights to the AL-60 in 1968.

The aircraft featured a strut-braced high-wing, a six to eight seat enclosed cabin and optional fixed tricycle landing gear, conventional landing gear, floats or skis and a single engine in tractor configuration. The Ranger differed from the AL-60 in having main landing gear leg fairings and Hoerner wing tips.

The Ranger's wing employed large flaps. Approved floats were Edo Aircraft Corporation models and both straight skis and Genaire Limited Canada Fluidyne Engineering wheel skis could also be fitted. Cabin access was through the small left front pilot door or a large cabin passenger and freight door.

The initial version proposed used the 400 hp (298 kW) Lycoming IO-720 A1A engine, but this did not provide adequate float performance and in 1970 was replaced by a 520 hp (388 kW) Lycoming IO-720 B1A powerplant and the version termed the Ranger C-6 to distinguish it from the last production Aermacchi AL-60C-5 model. The increased power gave a take-off distance to 50 ft (15 m) of 915 ft (279 m) and a landing distance from 50 ft (15 m) of 920 ft (280 m).

With the 520 hp (388 kW) engine the aircraft had an empty weight of 2,848 lb (1,292 kg) and a gross weight of 4,700 lb (2,100 kg), giving a useful load of 1,852 lb (840 kg). With full fuel of 91 U.S. gallons (340 L; 76 imp gal) the payload was 1,306 lb (592 kg).

The initial version was prototyped in 1968 but a long period of performance and user trials followed which resulted in design changes and the improved C-6 model, prior to production commencing. Development had ended by 1972, but it is not clear how many were completed, although at least four bore Canadian registration at one time. The fate of the NWI prototype CF-XED is not known and it is likely that no Rangers exist today. As of September 2013 none remain registered with Transport Canada or with the Federal Aviation Administration in the United States.

== Variants ==
Ranger
Initial proposed version with 400 hp (298 kW) Lycoming IO-720 A1A engine. Generally similar to the Italian Aermacchi AL-60C-5 model.
Ranger C-6
Improved proposed version with an upgraded 520 hp (388 kW) Lycoming IO-720 B1A engine.

== Specifications (Ranger) ==
Data from Plane and Pilot and Jane's All The World's Aircraft

General characteristics

- Crew: one
- Capacity: seven passengers
- Empty weight: 2,848 lb (1,292 kg)
- Gross weight: 4,700 lb (2,132 kg)
- Fuel capacity: 91 U.S. gallons (340 L; 76 imp gal)
- Powerplant: 1 × Lycoming Engines air-cooled, four stroke aircraft engine, 520 hp (390 kW)

Performance

- Maximum speed: 170 mph (270 km/h, 150 kn)
- Cruise speed: 166 mph (267 km/h, 144 kn)
- Stall speed: 38 mph (61 km/h, 33 kn)
- Range: 530 mi (850 km, 460 nmi)
- Service ceiling: 20,000 ft (6,100 m)
- Rate of climb: 1,475 ft/min (7.49 m/s)
