= Barr 6 =

American homebuilt airplane

General information
- Type: Amateur-built aircraft
- National origin: United States
- Manufacturer: Barr Aircraft (1989-2006); Morrison Aircraft (2006-present)
- Status: In production (2012)
- Number built: at least one

History
- Introduction date: 2003
- First flight: circa 2004

The Barr 6, also called the Barr Six, Barr 06 and more recently the Morrison 6, is an American amateur-built aircraft that was initially produced by Barr Aircraft of Williamsport, Pennsylvania and now by Morrison Aircraft of Nambour, Queensland, Australia. The aircraft is supplied as a kit for amateur construction.

== Design and development ==
The development of the Barr 6 was commenced by aeronautical engineer Jim Barr of Williamsport, Pennsylvania in 1989, with the aim of producing a kit aircraft that would be lower in cost to buy and operate than comparable certified aircraft. He invested over US$2M of his own funds in the project during its 17-year development. The design goal was a STOL aircraft comparable to the Cessna 207 in size and layout and the resulting aircraft greatly resembles a Cessna 207 made from composite materials.

Barr initially contracted GATS, an engineering consulting firm based in Lock Haven, Pennsylvania, to do the design work. The first four designs, Barr 1 though 4, used welded 4130 steel tubing for the fuselage, covered with fiberglass skin. The results were not acceptable and Barr proceeded with a fifth design, with the fuselage made from pre-preg E-glass sandwiches on a Nomex core. This proved promising and the sixth design combined this with the use of structural 0.097 in (2.464 mm) graphite rods, the end design utilizing 5,000 ft (1,524 m) of the rods. The prototype aircraft, N83W was registered in 2003 and was noted as flying by 2004.

The final kit design features a strut-braced high-wing, six-seats in an enclosed cabin, with the passengers in club seating (two seats facing forward and two facing rearwards), fixed tricycle landing gear or optionally conventional landing gear and a single engine in tractor configuration. The cabin is accessed by clamshell doors on the right aft fuselage, with a separate pilot door.

The aircraft is made from a mixture of different types of composites, including 7781 E-Glass pre-preg with 36-38% epoxy resin and structural graphite rods. Its 35.9 ft (10.9 m) span wing employs a NACA 2412 mod airfoil, has an area of 174 sq ft (16.2 m^{2}) and large flaps. The standard engine recommended is the 400 hp (298 kW) Lycoming IO-720-A1BD eight cylinder, horizontally opposed four-stroke powerplant.

The aircraft kit allows for the installation of many options, including Edo Corporation 4930 floats for water operations with associated lift rings, skis for snow operations, taildragger landing gear, oxygen and wheel pants. Morrison has also done developmental work on installing an Allison 250 turboprop powerplant.

In 1998 the kit was estimated that it would cost US$41,000. By 2004 the kit cost US$89,900, with a quick-build option adding US$69,000 to that price, which included factory builder assistance and a guarantee of aircraft completion in one year. A complete aircraft with the Lycoming IO-720-A1BD engine was estimated to cost US$215,000 in 2004.

Barr decided to sell the design and retire prior to achieving kit production, saying, "I was 62 in June 2006 and do not have the energy, which I once had, to set up manufacturing of kits for customers. The assets of Barr 6 manufacturing have been sold because I can not do it myself."

Steve Morrison of Morrison Aircraft, located in Nambour, Queensland, Australia, purchased the assets of Barr Aircraft on 15 November 2006 and had the parts, jigs and equipment shipped to Australia, arriving in January 2007. Production of new aircraft was planned for May 2008, with the flight of the first example intended for early in 2009, although there is no indication this was completed.

== Operational history ==
The US Federal Aviation Administration registry indicates just one aircraft registered, the original prototype, registered in 2003.

In evaluating the prototype in 2004, pilot Bill McCleary said, "the Barr 6 is not like a Beech Bonanza or Piper Lance, but rather a big utility airplane with a 4500 pound gross weight and large cabin. It is like flying a Cessna 210 with 400 hp, and has an excessive amount of power on takeoff, climb and cruise flight ranges. A Cessna 172 or Skylane is a much easier type to fly for quick trips and no requirement of a large cabin useful load or higher speed. The Barr 6 certainly stands by itself."

== Specifications (version) ==
Data from Bayerl, Tacke and Morrison

General characteristics

- Crew: one
- Capacity: five passengers
- Length: 29 ft 11 in (9.12 m)
- Wingspan: 35 ft 10 in (10.92 m)
- Height: 7 ft 2 in (2.18 m)
- Wing area: 174 sq ft (16.2 m^{2})
- Aspect ratio: 7.63:1
- Airfoil: NACA 2412 mod
- Empty weight: 2,501 lb (1,134 kg) with six seats and IFR instrumentation
- Gross weight: 4,500 lb (2,041 kg)
- Fuel capacity: 90 U.S. gallons (340 L; 75 imp gal) standard; 140 U.S. gallons (530 L; 120 imp gal) optional
- Powerplant: 1 × Lycoming IO-720-A eight cylinder, air-cooled, four stroke aircraft engine, 400 hp (300 kW)
- Propellers: 3-bladed Hartzell Propeller constant speed propeller, 6 ft 11 in (2.11 m) diameter

Performance

- Cruise speed: 206 mph (332 km/h, 179 kn)
- Stall speed: 62 mph (100 km/h, 54 kn) flaps down
- Never exceed speed: 248 mph (399 km/h, 216 kn)
- Rate of climb: 900 ft/min (4.6 m/s)
- Wing loading: 25.9 lb/sq ft (126 kg/m^{2})
