= Fred Weick =

American aircraft engineer

Fred Ernest Weick
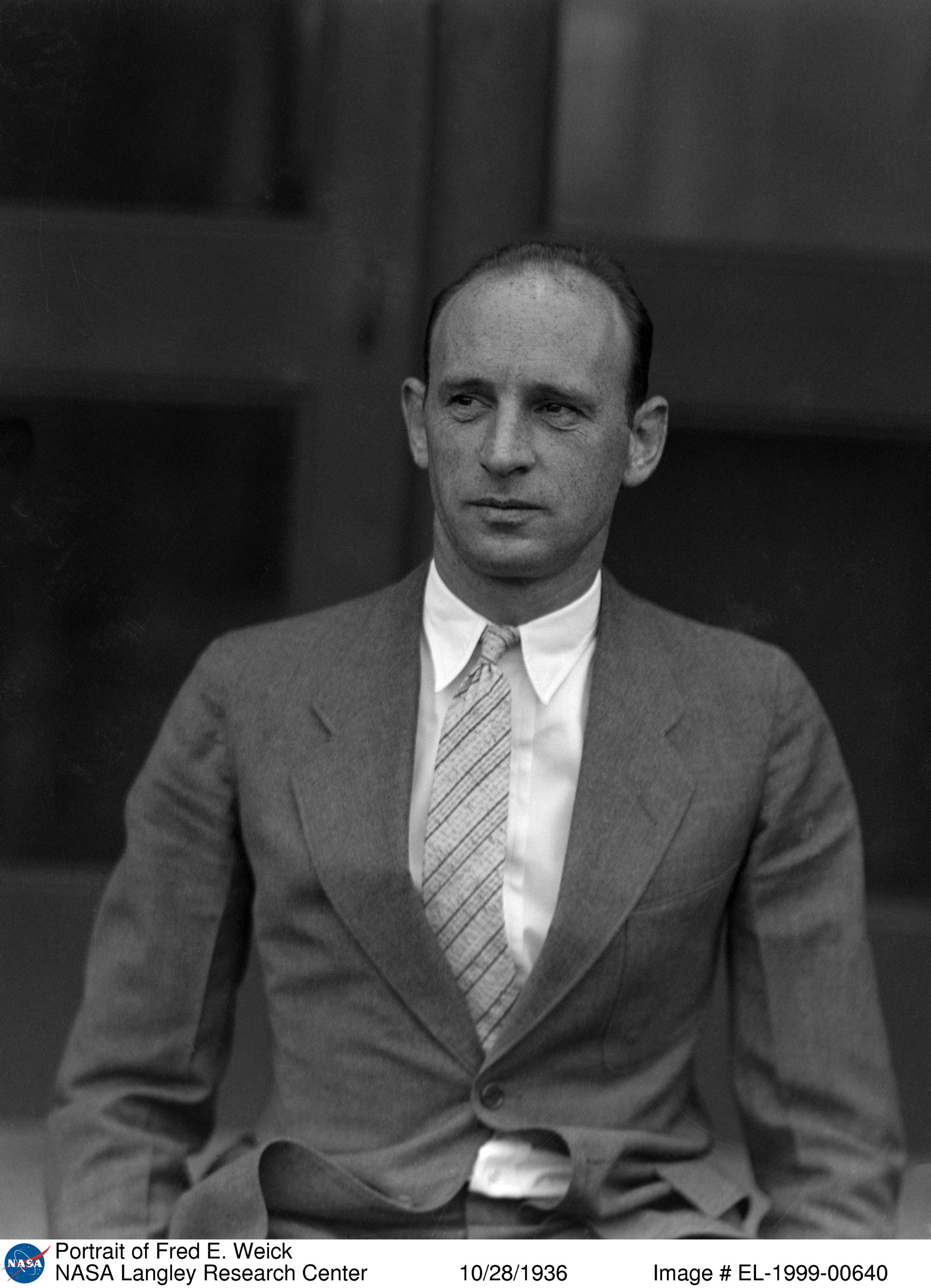
- Portrait of Fred E. Weick, 1936
- Born: July 14, 1899; Berwyn, Illinois, U.S.
- Died: July 8, 1993 (aged 93); Vero Beach, Florida, U.S.
- Education: University of Illinois
- Occupation: Aircraft Engineer
- Employer(s): NACA; Piper Aircraft; Texas A&M University
- Known for: NACA engine cowling Ercoupe
- Spouse: Dorothy Church (1900–1991)
- Awards: Collier Trophy 1929; Daniel Guggenheim Medal (1989)

Fred Ernest Weick (July 14, 1899 – July 8, 1993) was an American airmail pilot, research engineer, and aircraft designer. Working at the NACA, he won the 1929 Collier Trophy for his design of the NACA cowling for radial air-cooled engines. Weick's aircraft designs include the Ercoupe, Piper PA-25 Pawnee, and Cherokee.

== Life ==
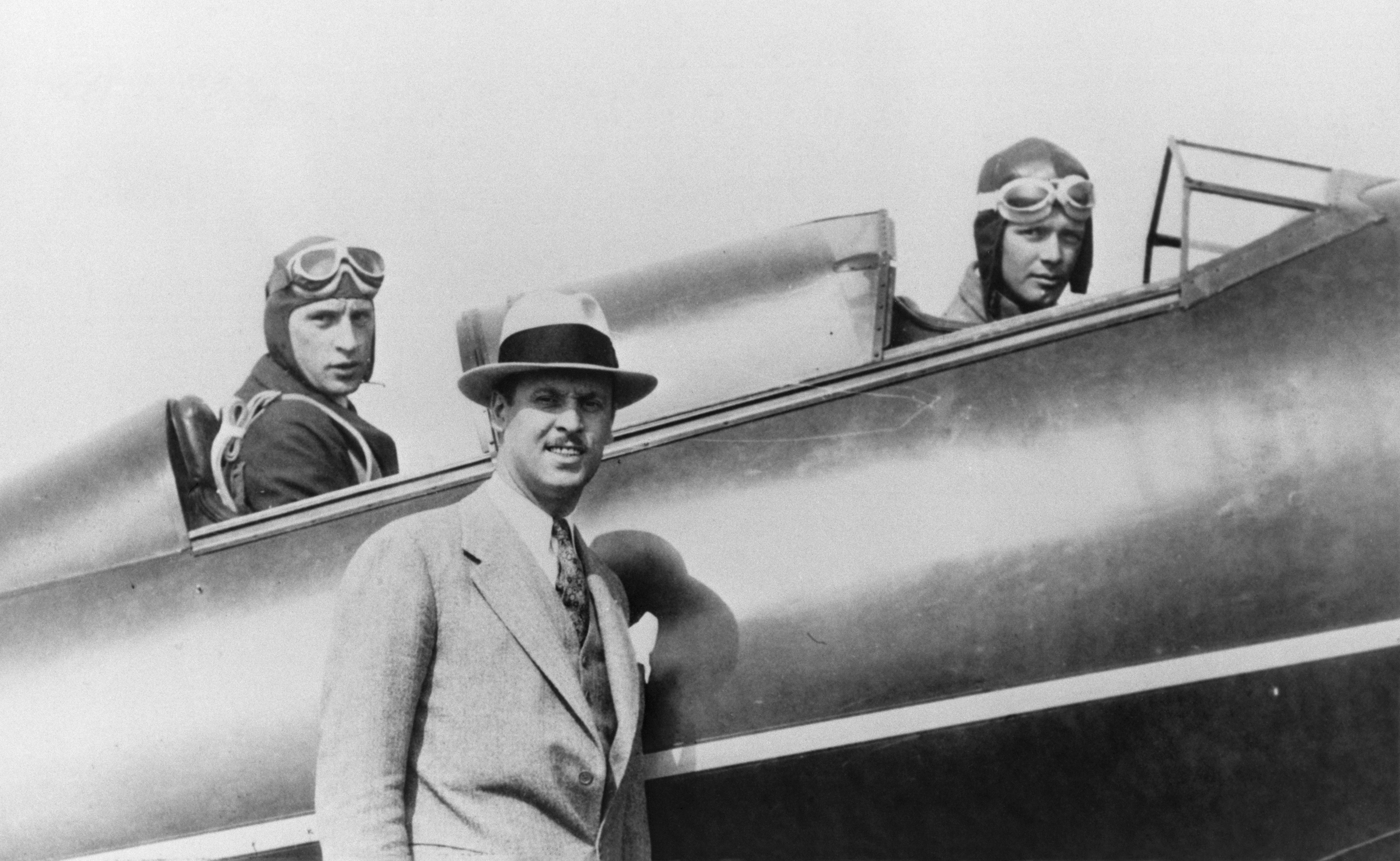
1927 – Weick in rear cockpit with Lindbergh in front

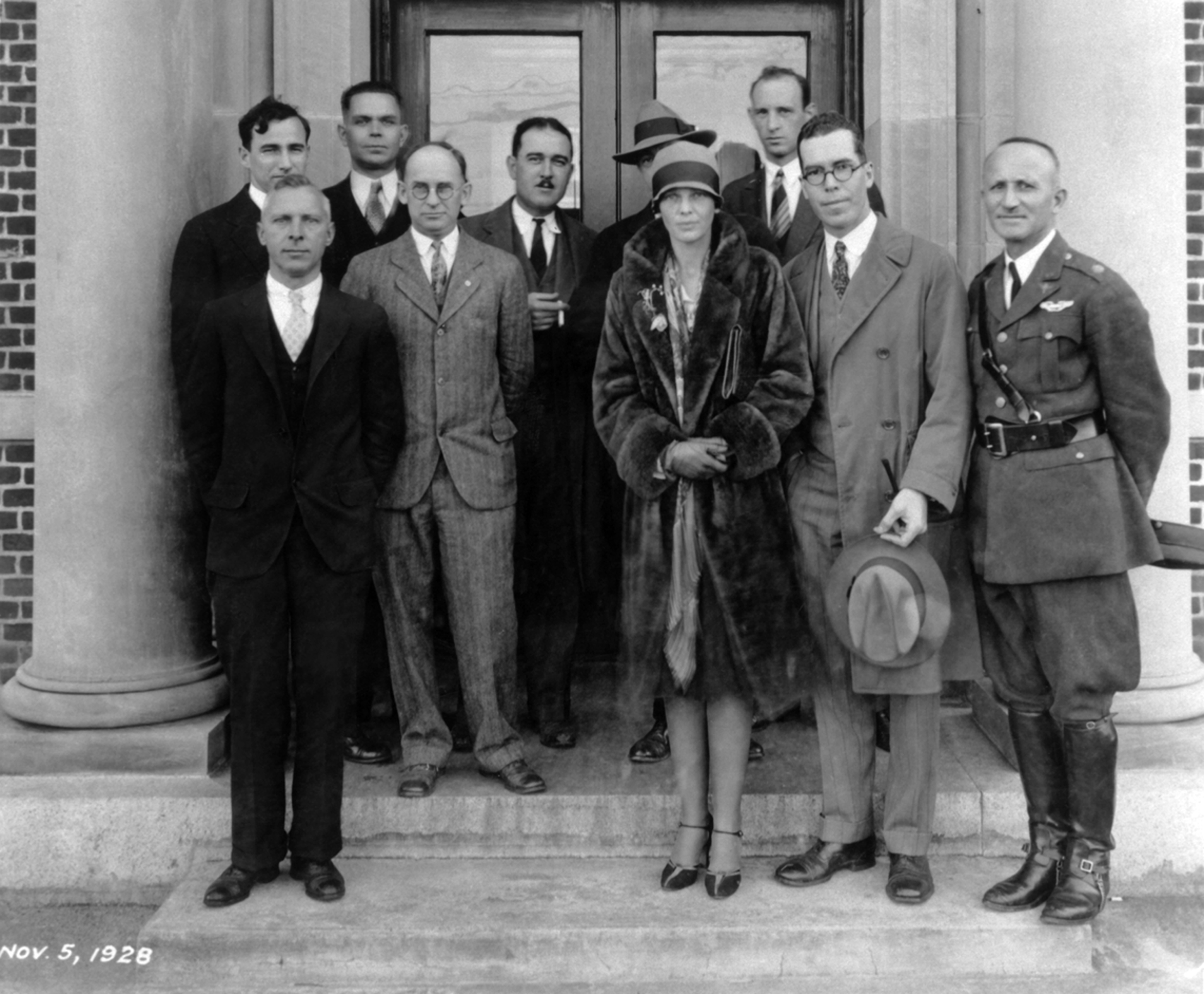
1928 – Weick in back row far right, Amelia Earhart center

A 1922 graduate of the University of Illinois, he was one of the first university graduates to apply his degree to a career in aeronautics. Weick was also one of the first engineers hired by the original U.S. Air Mail Service. His efforts in the early 1920s to establish emergency fields for night-flying mail pilots addressed a major challenge.

Weick worked for the National Advisory Committee for Aeronautics (NACA) at its Langley Aeronautical Laboratory, in Hampton, Virginia beginning in November 1925. He helped design the first wind tunnel devoted to full-scale propeller research and wrote a textbook on propeller design that became a classic.

It was also at Langley that Weick headed the development of streamlined, low-drag engine cowling technology that was to advance aircraft performance dramatically. The NACA cowling first revolutionized civil air transport by making aircraft faster and more profitable. It also found application on the bombers and fighters of World War II. For this engineering breakthrough, he won the prestigious Collier Trophy for NACA in 1929.

The experimental airplane he built in the early 1930s demonstrated Weick's passion for safety. He left NACA in 1936, and joined ERCO's fledgling aircraft team as chief designer. His goal was to make flying as easy and safe as driving the family auto. In addition to the integrated controls for ease of flying, he incorporated the tricycle landing gear that later became standard on most of the world's aircraft.

Later in the 1930s, Weick improved on that design with the Ercoupe, the two-seat, all-metal, low-wing aircraft that was so easy and safe to fly that many students mastered it in five hours or less. Half of the 6,000 Ercoupes built were still flying at the time of Weick's death. In February 1946, he received the Fawcett Aviation Award "in recognition of his development of a spinproof, stallproof, all-safety, dual control light plane that is as easy to fly as the average automobile..." that year's greatest contribution to the scientific advancement of aviation.

Weick joined Texas A&M University in 1948. There, he worked on the design and development of the Ag-1 crop duster, and designed the Ag-3, predecessor to the Piper PA-25 Pawnee series. The same basic configuration and design concepts pioneered in the Ag-1 can be seen in more modern crop dusters including the Air Tractor AT-802.

In a 1979 interview about general aviation's future past the year 2000, Weick accurately envisioned the continued interest in sport aviation and the practical use of aircraft for medium-range transportation. He mentioned that he had seen gas turbines demonstrated as early as 1922, and that their future use in light aircraft would only be viable with development of cost-efficient materials that could withstand the heat. He felt future aircraft would not be radically different, but could benefit from safety improvements in controllability.

He joined Piper Aircraft in 1957 as director and chief engineer of its development center, remaining there until his retirement at age 70. In addition to the Pawnee, Weick co-designed Piper's Cherokee line of personal and business light aircraft. Weick remained active in general aviation, regularly attending the Experimental Aircraft Association Oshkosh airshow for entertainment and lectures.

He married Dorothy Church (1900–1991) and they had three children together. Weick died on Thursday, July 8, 1993, in Vero Beach, Florida.

In 2002, Fred E. Weick was honored by the Virginia Aeronautical Historical Society, when he was inducted into the Virginia Aviation Hall of Fame for his contributions to aviation and aviation safety.

== Gallery ==
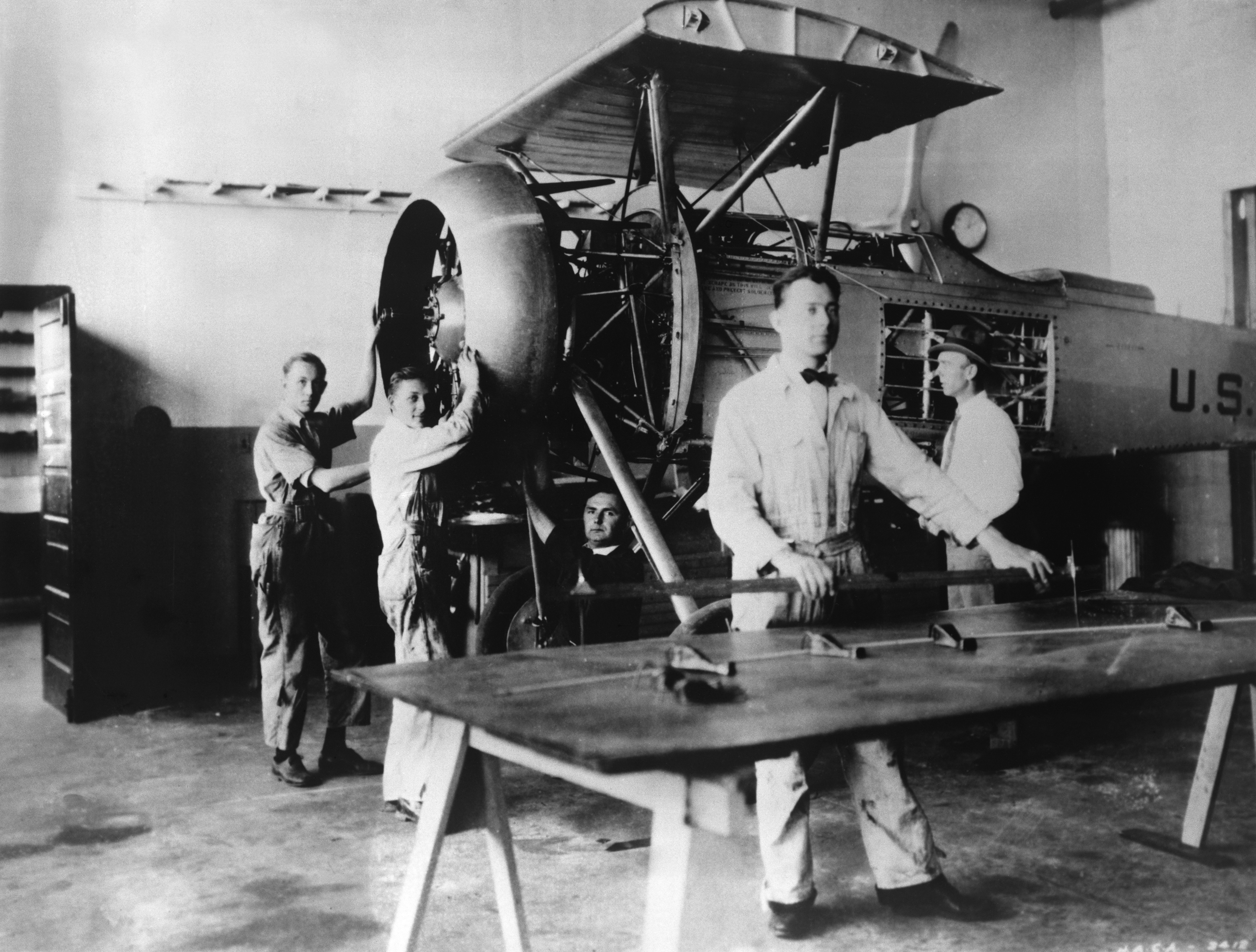
NACA Cowlings

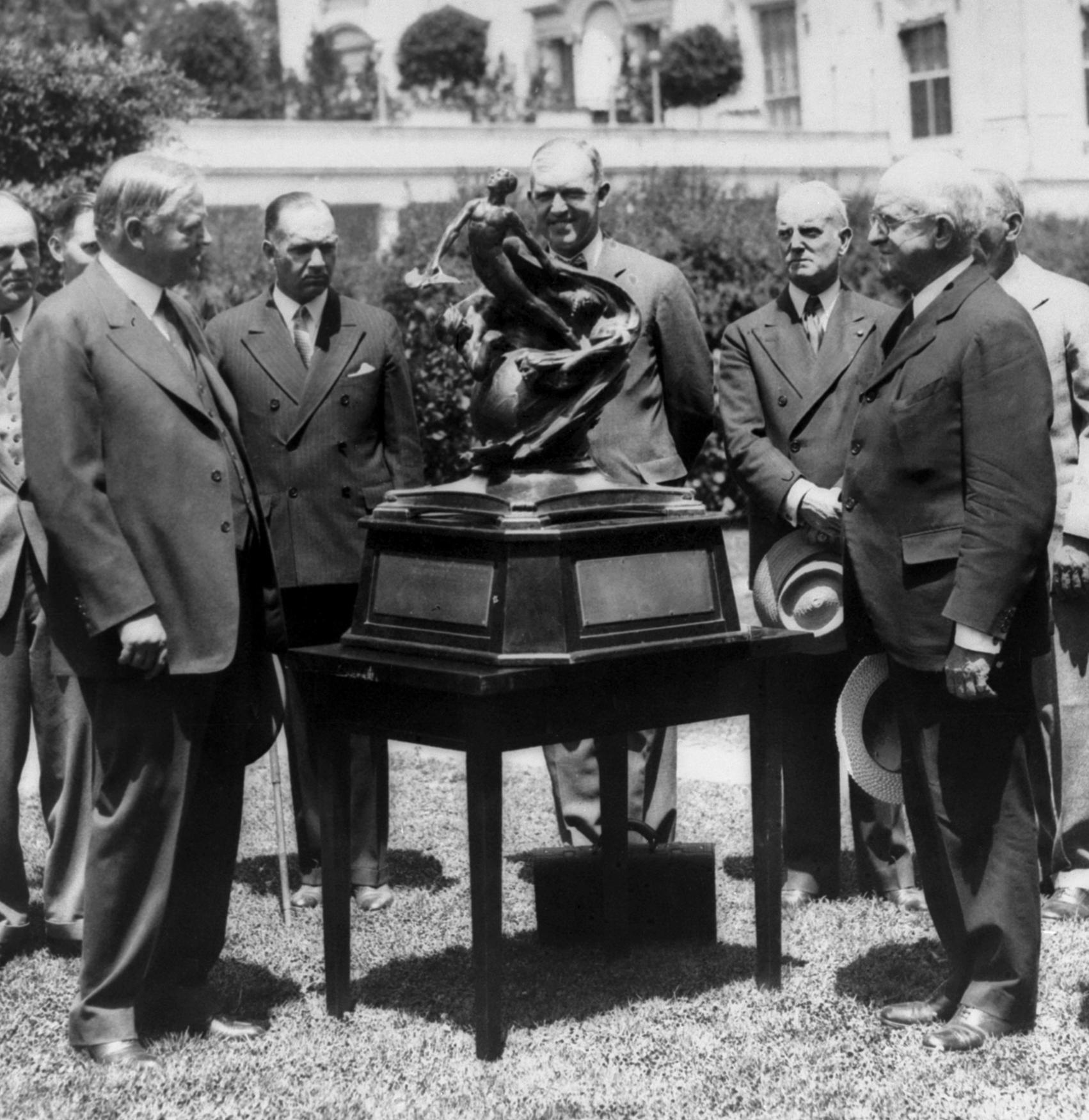
1929 Collier Trophy President Hoover presents the NACA's Chairman Joseph Ames for the NACA cowling

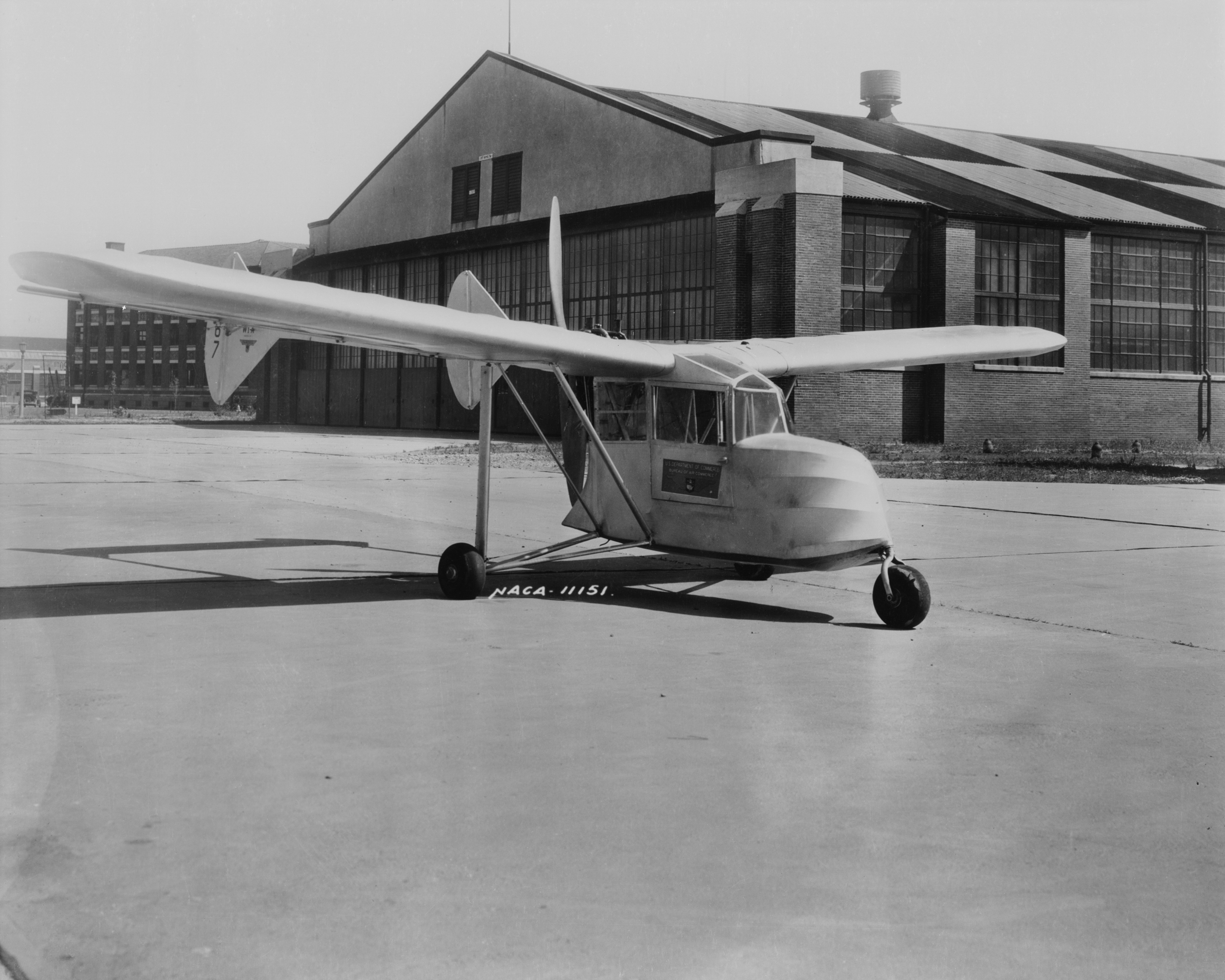
Weick W1A

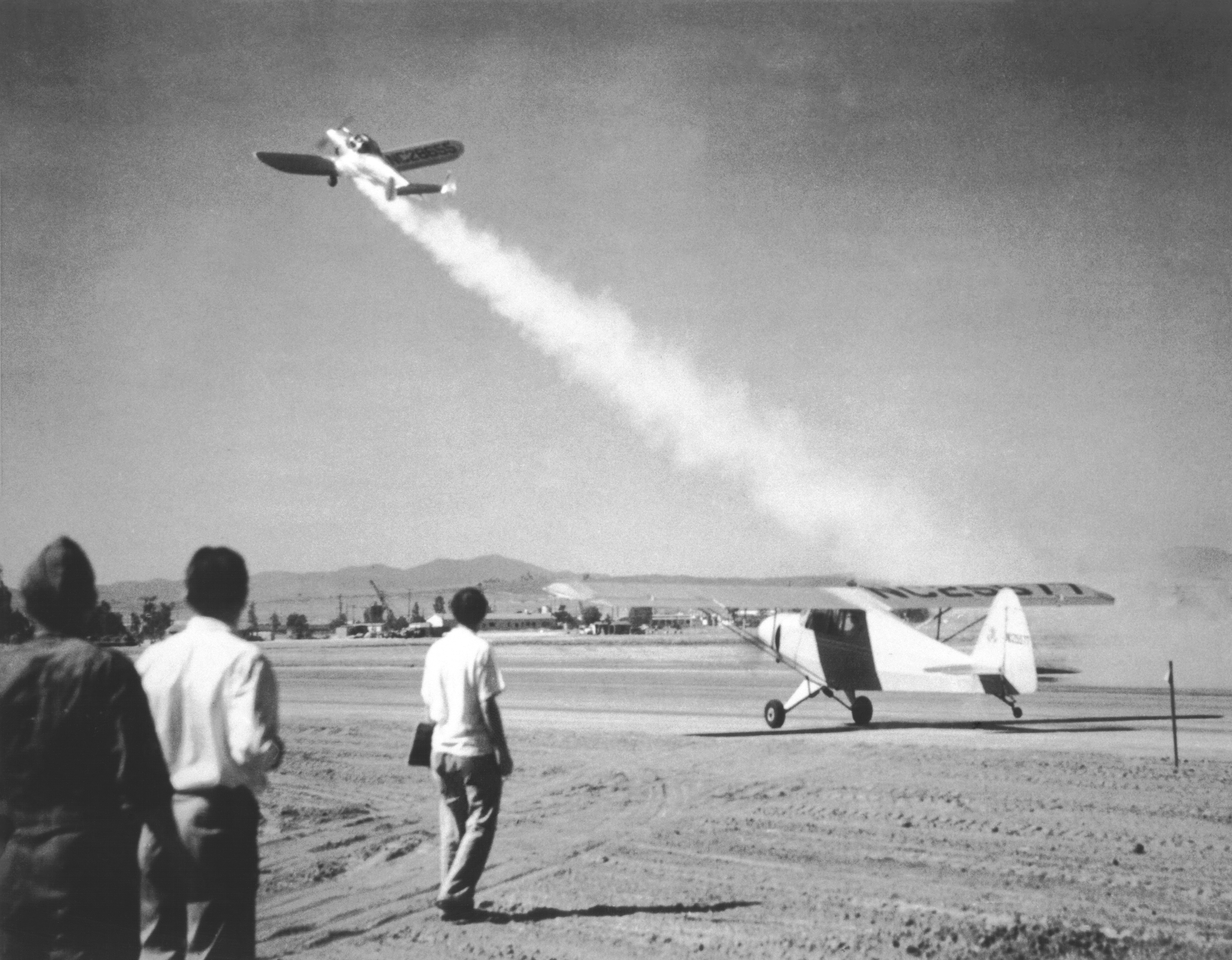
Ercoupe

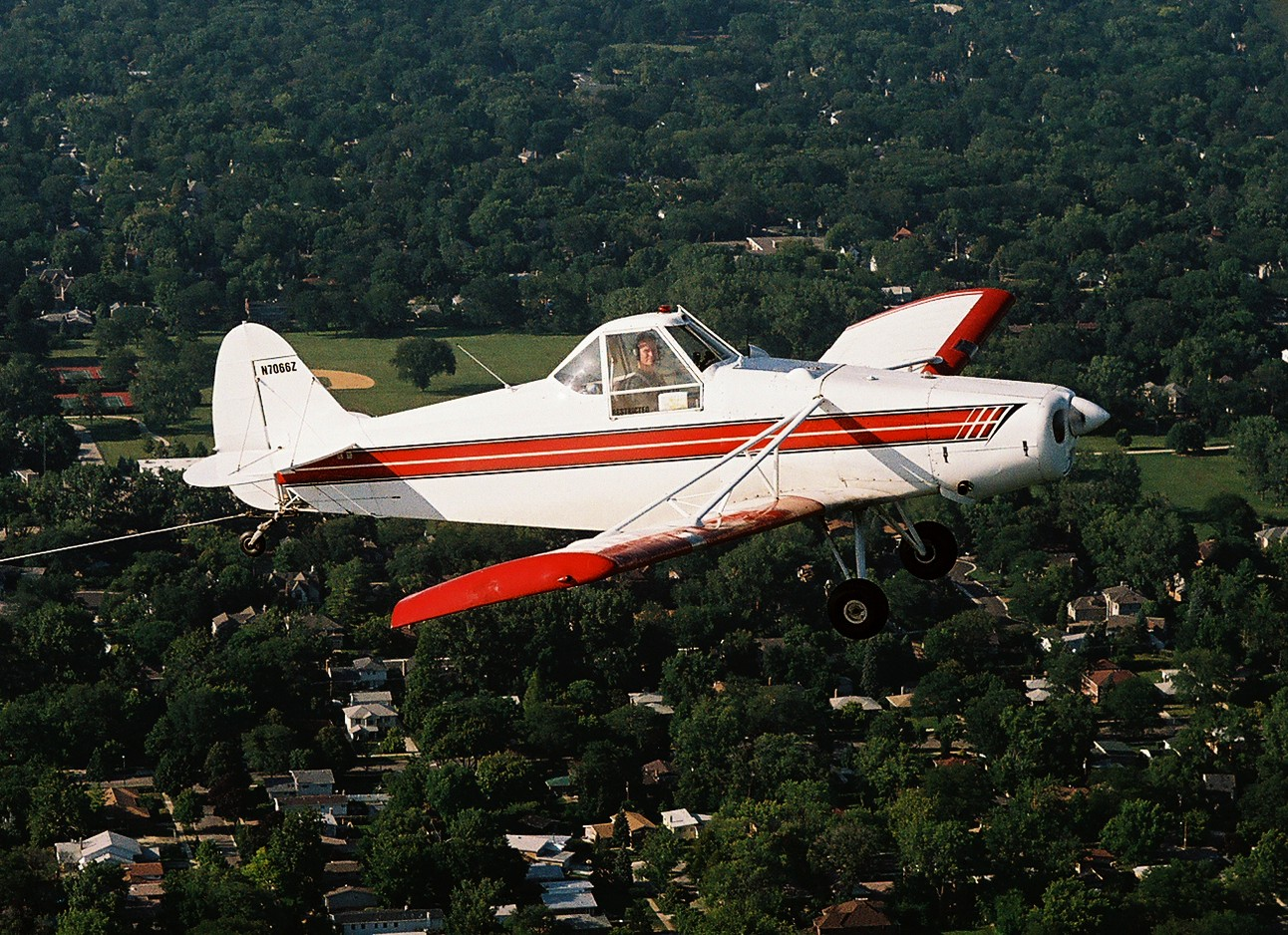
Pawnee

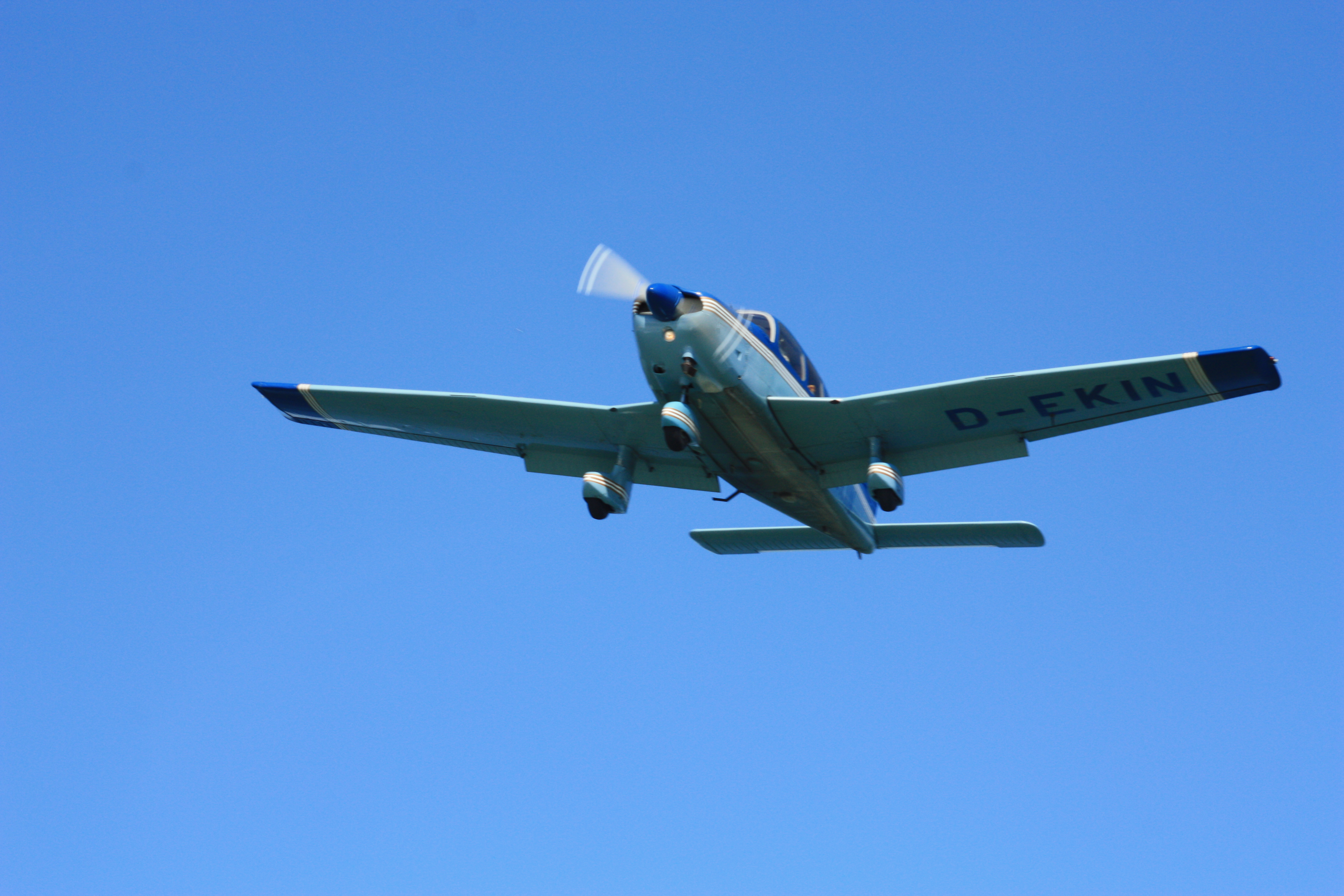
Piper Cherokee

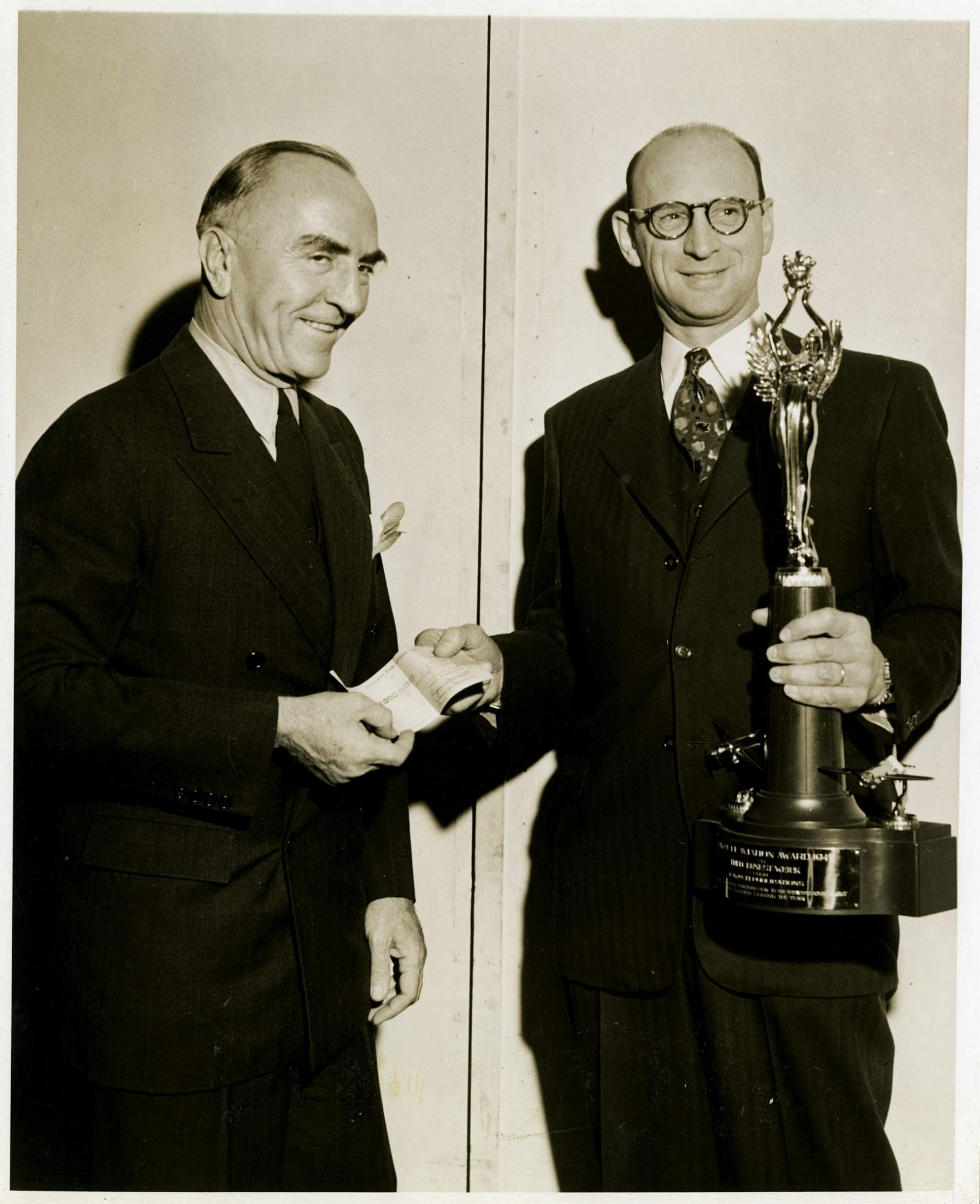
Eddie Rickenbacker (left) presents the Fawcett Aviation Award to Fred E. Weick (right), January 1946

== See also ==
- Max B. Harlow
- Otto C. Koppen

== Sources ==
- Weick, Fred E.; Hansen, James R. (1988). From the Ground Up. Washington D.C.: Smithsonian Institution Press. ISBN 0-87474-950-6.
- "Fred Weick" US Centennial of Flight Commission, retrieved January 12, 2006
- "FRED E. WEICK AUTOBIOGRAPHICAL TRANSCRIPTS", NATIONAL AIR AND SPACE ARCHIVES, Accession XXXX-0425
- "interview I had with Fred Weick" Coupe landings and landing gears, September 1991 Coupe Capers: Ed Burkhead
