= Texas A&M College Ag-1 =

Ag-1

General information
- Type: Experimental agricultural aircraft
- National origin: United States
- Manufacturer: Agricultural and Mechanical College of Texas (Texas A&M College)
- Designer: Fred Weick
- Number built: 1

History
- First flight: 1 December 1950

The Texas A&M College Ag-1 was a prototype single seat, single engine aircraft, one of the first specifically designed for agricultural spraying, dusting and fertilizer spreading. It was the first of a series of designs that led to the Piper PA-25 Pawnee.

== Design and development ==
Soon after World War II the National Flying Farmers Association in the United States set up a research programme on agricultural aviation. This was supported by the CAA and undertaken by the Personal Aircraft Research Centre at the Agricultural and Mechanical College of Texas. The Ag-1, designed by Fred Weick, was the first outcome of this programme and led some eight years later to the Piper PA-25 Pawnee, another Weick design. A CAA contract was awarded on 7 December 1949 which provided input from the CAA, the Department of Agriculture and two aircraft manufacturers. A country-wide survey conducted by the CAA, backed up with a series of personal interviews, established a user view of the necessary features of an aircraft intended for crop spraying, dusting and fertiliser application. Aided by the donation of engine, propeller, undercarriage etc. by interested makers, the Ag-1 made its first flight on 1 December 1950, less than a year after the start of the contract.

The main design criteria were set by the disposable nature of the aircraft's load and its rugged and hazardous working environment. The first required the load in its hopper to be placed at the aerodynamic center, about 25% chord; safety demanded a good view from the cockpit in all directions but particularly forwards, so the cockpit was placed high behind the hopper with the forward fuselage sloping downwards at 15°. The seat was designed to withstand 40g's The cockpit was open but with two strong, curved longitudinal frames to ease any obstructions, cables and the like, safely over the pilot's head. The leading edges of the undercarriage legs were sharpened to cut through similar hazards. Good low-speed flight characteristics, even with a heavy load, were also essential, calling for a high-lift wing. The all-metal Ag-1 was a cantilever low wing monoplane with an unusually thick (thickness/chord 21%), constant chord wing, fitted with full span slotted flaps and slot-lip ailerons. (Note: Slot lip ailerons provide lateral control on wings with trailing edges filled with slotted flaps. A narrow control surface just ahead of the upper end of the slot breaks up the flow behind it when raised; as the upper surface lift falls, the flow through the slot is reduced and the less lift is produced by the flap, dropping that wing.) It had a short centre section with no dihedral and outer panels with 5° of dihedral. The legs of the fixed, conventional undercarriage, with wheels fitted with low pressure tyres, were mounted on this inner wing section, which also contained internal tanks, capacity 150 US gal (568L) for crop spraying liquid. The wing tip tip to tip spray boom was contained within the wing profile.

The fuselage was flat sided apart from curved decking behind the cockpit. The hopper had a filling hatch immediately in front of the cockpit and a sliding gate and distributor below. It had a 27 cu ft ( 0.76 m^{3}) capacity. The Ag-1 had a wide span (17 ft 9 in; 5.41 m), rectangular tailplane and an angular fin and rudder, the latter reaching down to the bottom of the fuselage and fitted with a trim tab. Under it, at the extreme fuselage was a steerable tailwheel. It was powered by an air-cooled 225 hp (168 kW) Continental E225 flat-six engine mounted well forward and low in the nose. This initially drove a fixed pitch, two blade propeller though there were plans to replace it with a variable pitch one.

The Ag-1 was followed by two more agricultural prototypes, the Transland Ag-2 and Transland Ag-3; the latter was the immediate predecessor of the Piper Pawnee. Though the Pawnee was smaller, lighter, different in detail and initially less powerful than the Ag-1, its basic layout remained unchanged.

== Specifications ==
Data from Jane's All the World's Aircraft 1952-3 Performance data is estimated at full load.

General characteristics

- Crew: 1
- Length: 29 ft 8 in (9.05 m)
- Wingspan: 39 ft 0 in (11.89 m)
- Height: 8 ft 6 in (2.6 m)
- Airfoil: Modified NACA 64021
- Empty weight: 1,903 lb (863 kg)
- Gross weight: 3,402 lb (1,543 kg)
- Fuel capacity: 48 US gallons (40 imp gal; 180 L)
- Powerplant: 1 × Continental E225 6-cylinder horizontally opposed air-cooled piston, 225 hp (168 kW)
- Propellers: 2-bladed McCauley, 7 ft 6 in (2.28 m) diameter fixed pitch aluminium alloy

Performance

- Maximum speed: 115 mph (185 km/h, 100 kn)
- Cruise speed: 100 mph (160 km/h, 87 kn)
- Range: 400 mi (640 km, 350 nmi)
- Endurance: 3.5 h
- Service ceiling: 12,000 ft (3,700 m)
- Rate of climb: 600 ft/min (3.0 m/s)
- Operating speed: 60-90 mph (96-144 km/h)
- Landing speed: 45 mph (72 km/h)
- Take-off to 50 ft (15.25 m): 1,300 ft (396 m)
