= Lycoming IO-720 =

Horizontally opposed, eight-cylinder aircraft engine

IO-720
- Type: Piston aero-engine
- National origin: United States
- Manufacturer: Lycoming Engines
- First run: 1961
- Major applications: PAC Fletcher; Piper Comanche 400; Helio Courier
- Manufactured: 1961–present
- Developed from: Lycoming O-360

The Lycoming IO-720 engine is a large displacement, horizontally opposed, eight-cylinder aircraft engine featuring four cylinders per side, manufactured by Lycoming Engines.

There is no carbureted version of the engine, which would have been designated O-720 and therefore the base model is the IO-720. The IO-720 is the only flat-eight configuration aircraft engine currently in production.

== Design and development ==
The engine has a fuel injection system which schedules fuel flow proportionally to the airflow, with fuel vaporization occurring at the intake ports. The engine has a displacement of 722 cubic inches (11.8 litres) and produces 400 hp (298 kW). The cylinders have air-cooled heads cast from aluminum alloy with a fully machined combustion chamber.

The first IO-720 was type certified on 25 October 1961 to the CAR 13 standard as amended to 15 June 1956 including 13-1, 13-2, 13-3, 13-4.

In 2009 a new IO-720-A1B cost US$113,621, with a rebuilt engine retailing for US$75,435 and a factory overhaul priced at US$66,289.

== Variants ==
IO-720-A1A
Eight-cylinder, horizontally opposed, air-cooled direct drive, fuel injection, internal oil jet piston cooling, 722 cubic inches (11.8 litres), 400 hp (298 kW), certified 25 October 1961
IO-720-A1B
fuel-injected, 722 cubic inches (11.8 litres), 400 hp (298 kW), same as -A1A except equipped with Bendix S8LN-1208 and S8LN-1209 magnetos, certified 22 February 1971
IO-720-A1BD
fuel-injected, 722 cubic inches (11.8 litres), 400 hp (298 kW), same as -A1B except has a dual magneto, certified 30 December 1976
IO-720-B1A
fuel-injected, 722 cubic inches (11.8 litres), 400 hp (298 kW), same as -A1A except for top exhaust cylinders and offset exhaust valve shroud tubes, certified 4 November 1965
IO-720-B1B
fuel-injected, 722 cubic inches (11.8 litres), 400 hp (298 kW), same as -B1A except equipped with Bendix S8LN-1208 and S8LN-1209 magnetos and Bendix RSA-10ED1 fuel injection, certified 22 February 1971
IO-720-B1BD
fuel-injected, 722 cubic inches (11.8 litres), 400 hp (298 kW), same as -B1B except has a dual magneto, certified 30 December 1976
IO-720-C1B
fuel-injected, 722 cubic inches (11.8 litres), 400 hp (298 kW), same as -A1B except that it has up-exhaust cylinder heads, certified 22 December 1971
IO-720-C1BD
fuel-injected, 722 cubic inches (11.8 litres), 400 hp (298 kW), same as -C1B except has a dual magneto, certified 28 January 1977
IO-720-D1B
fuel-injected, 722 cubic inches (11.8 litres), 400 hp (298 kW), same as -A1B except has a rear type air inlet housing instead of a front inlet, certified 29 October 1973
IO-720-D1BD
fuel-injected, 722 cubic inches (11.8 litres), 400 hp (298 kW), same as -D1B except has a dual magneto, certified 28 January 1977
IO-720-D1C
fuel-injected, 722 cubic inches (11.8 litres), 400 hp (298 kW), same as -D1B except equipped with an angled fuel injector adapter, certified 15 April 1982
IO-720-D1CD
fuel-injected, 722 cubic inches (11.8 litres), 400 hp (298 kW), same as -D1C except has a dual magneto, certified 10 June 1977

== Applications ==
IO-720-A1A

- Northwest Ranger - factory installation
- Piper Comanche 400 - factory installation

IO-720-A1B

- Beechcraft 80 - Excalibur and Queen Air conversions
- Helio Courier - Helio Courier H-800 factory installation
- Pacific Aerospace FU-24-954
- Piper PA-36 Pawnee Brave - Johnson Aircraft conversion

IO-720-A1BD

- Barr 6

IO-720-B1A

- Northwest Ranger C-6 - factory installation

IO-720-B1B

- Aero Commander - MR. R.P.M. conversion

IO-720-B1BD

- Aero Commander - MR. R.P.M. conversion

IO-720-D1B

- Embraer EMB 202 Ipanema - factory installation

IO-720-D1C

- Piper PA-36 Pawnee Brave - Johnson Aircraft conversion

IO-720-D1CD

- Piper PA-36 Pawnee Brave - Johnson Aircraft conversion

== Specifications (IO-720A) ==
Data from Lycoming Specialty Datasheet and TYPE CERTIFICATE DATA SHEET NO. 1E15, Revision 6

=== General characteristics ===
- Type: 8-cylinder fuel-injected horizontally opposed aircraft engine
- Bore: 5.125 in (130.18 mm)
- Stroke: 4.375 (111.12 mm)
- Displacement: 722 in³ (11.8 litres)
- Length: 46.41 In (117.88 cm)
- Width: 34.25 in (87.00 cm)
- Height: 22.53 in (57.23 cm)
- Dry weight: 597 lb (271 kg) dry

=== Components ===
- Fuel system: Bendix RSA-10AD1 fuel-injection
- Fuel type: 100LL avgas
- Cooling system: air-cooled

=== Performance ===
- Power output: 400 hp (297 kW) at 2650 rpm
- Specific power: 0.55 hp/in³ (25.2 kW/L)
- Compression ratio: 8.70:1
- Power-to-weight ratio: 0.67 hp/lb (1.10 kW/kg)

== See also ==
- Jabiru 5100
