= Piper PA-25 Pawnee =

American agricultural aircraft

PA-25 Pawnee
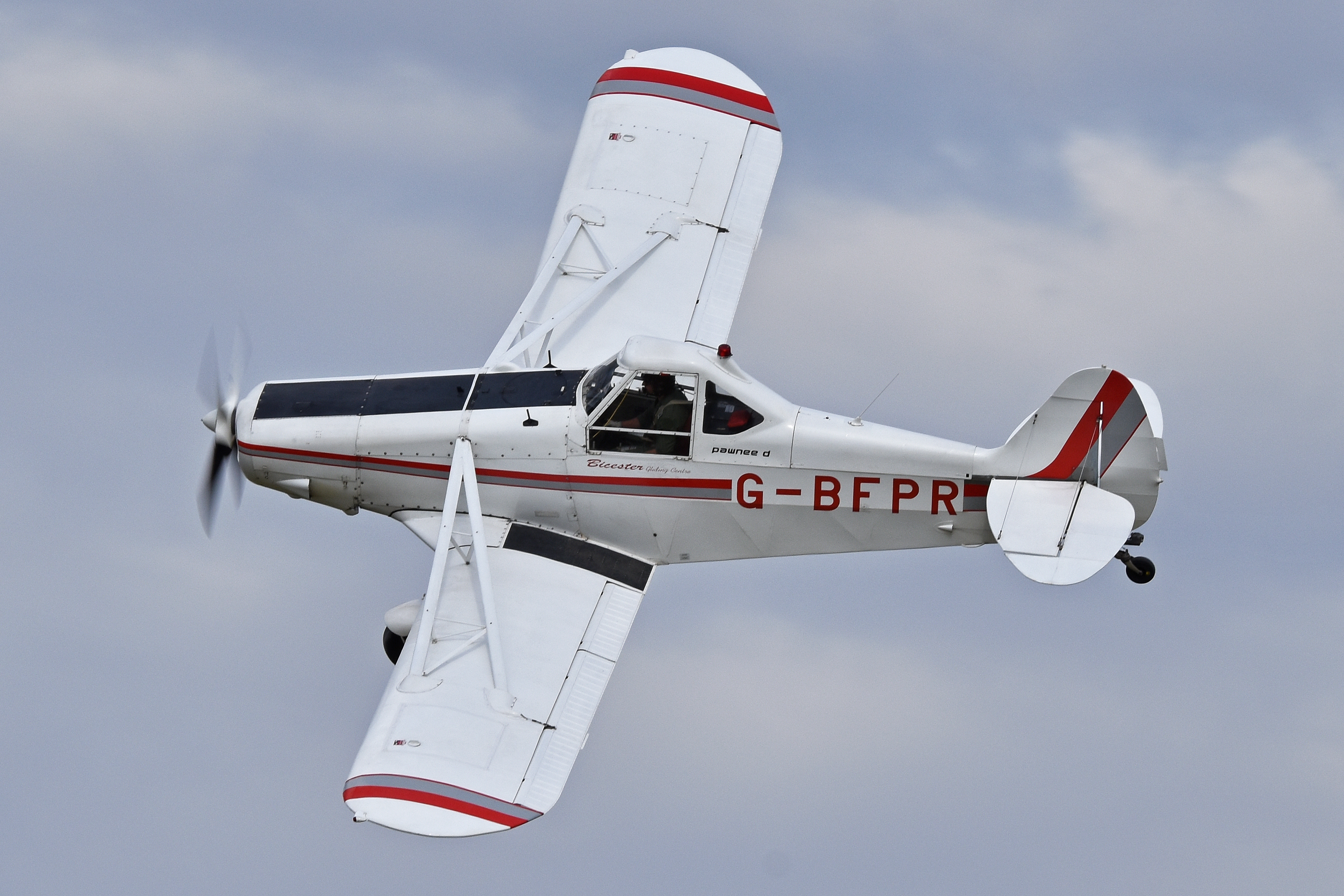
- PA-25 Pawnee

General information
- Type: Agricultural aircraft, Towplane
- National origin: United States
- Manufacturer: Piper Aircraft
- Designer: Fred Weick
- Number built: 5,167

History
- Manufactured: 1959-1981
- Introduction date: August 1959
- First flight: 1957

The PA-25 Pawnee is an agricultural aircraft produced by Piper Aircraft between 1959 and 1981. It remains a widely used aircraft in agricultural spraying and is also used as a tow plane, or tug, for launching gliders or for towing banners. In 1988, the design rights and support responsibility were sold to Latino Americana de Aviación of Argentina.

== Design and development ==
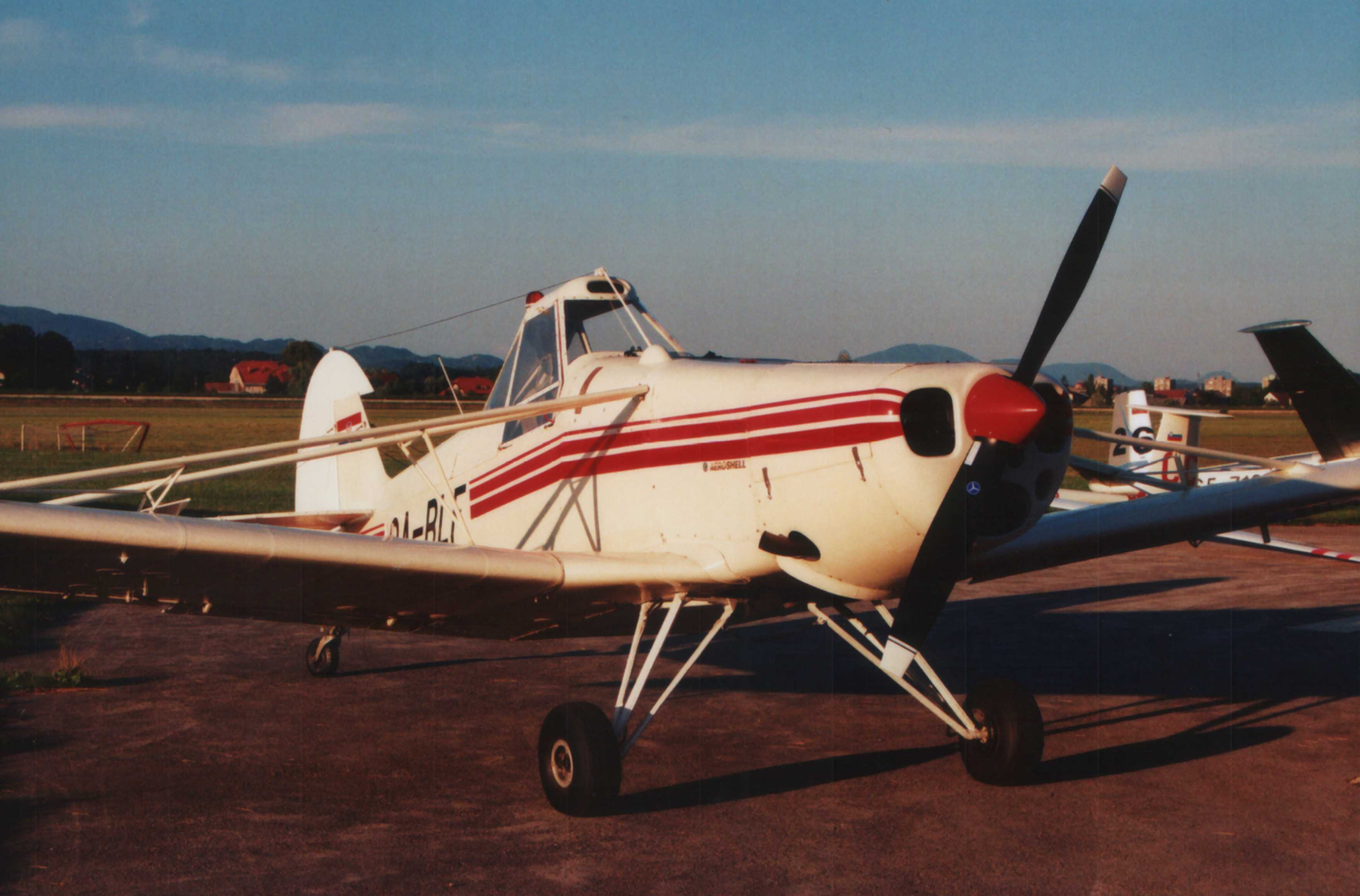
PA-25-235 Pawnee C at the Celje Airport

Most agricultural aircraft before 1949 were converted military aircraft and it was in that year that Fred Weick, based at Texas A&M University, designed a dedicated agricultural aircraft: the AG-1. The AG-1 first flew on 1 December 1950.

During 1953, Fred Weick was approached by Piper to become a consultant on the agricultural version of the PA-18, the PA-18A, in particular to design and test a distributor for dust and seeds. A few weeks later, Piper sponsored Texas A&M University to design a dedicated agricultural aircraft based on the AG-1 but to use as many PA-18A and PA-22 components as possible. The resulting design, the AG-3, was smaller than the AG-1 and had a steel tube fuselage which was fabric covered. The AG-3 was a single-seat, low-wing monoplane with the wings braced to the fuselage with struts. It had a conventional landing gear with a tailwheel and was powered by a 135 hp engine. The single seat was placed high in the fuselage to give the best visibility and an 800 lb-capacity hopper was fitted in front of the cockpit.

The AG-3 made its maiden flight in November 1954. The aircraft's flying tests were successful and, in 1957, Weick was invited to join Piper at Vero Beach, and the AG-3 was renamed the PA-25 Pawnee. The engine was upgraded to a 150 hp Lycoming O-320-A1A engine. Two pre-production aircraft were built at Vero Beach in 1957 and production started at Lock Haven, Pennsylvania, in May 1959.

In 1962, another prototype was built at Vero Beach with a 235 hp Lycoming O-540-B2B5 engine and production aircraft were produced at Lock Haven from 1962. In 1964, the Pawnee B was introduced with a larger hopper and improved dispersal gear. The Pawnee C of 1967 was fitted with oleo shock-absorbers and other improvements; also in 1967, a 260 hp variant was introduced.

Early models of the Pawnee had a single fuel tank located between the agricultural hopper and the engine. The National Transportation Safety Board recommended to Piper Aircraft that the early model PA-25's with a fiberglass fuel tank be retrofitted with a rubber fuel cell to minimize the chance of catastrophic failure and fire resulting from a crash.

In 1974, the Pawnee D was introduced, with the fuel tanks moved from the fuselage to the wings; the 260 hp variant was also available with either a fixed pitch or constant-speed propeller. Although still the same design as the "D", the 1980 and 1981 production aircraft were marketed as the Pawnee. The final production aircraft was completed at Lock Haven on 22 March 1981, the last of 5,167 Pawnees.

A useful design aspect was the ability to carry a mechanic on a jump seat fitted in the hopper to assist with operations at remote stations.

On April 15, 1988, Piper Aircraft, Inc. officially sold the PA-25 series aircraft to Latino Americana de Aviación S.A in Argentina. The sale included all drawings, engineering data, parts inventory, tools, catalogs, and manuals. All support of any nature became the responsibility of the new owners.

In 2019, Australia's Civil Aviation Safety Authority formally approved the issuing to eTugs of Certificates of Airworthiness in the Limited category for the purpose of glider towing. An etug is a PA-25 where the Lycoming engine has been replaced with a General Motors LS automotive engine. The advantages for glider towing, compared to a Lycoming powered PA-25, include a greater rate of climb, reduced fuel consumption, the elimination of shock cooling (since the LS is water-cooled rather than air-cooled) and a less costly maintenance regime.

== Variants ==
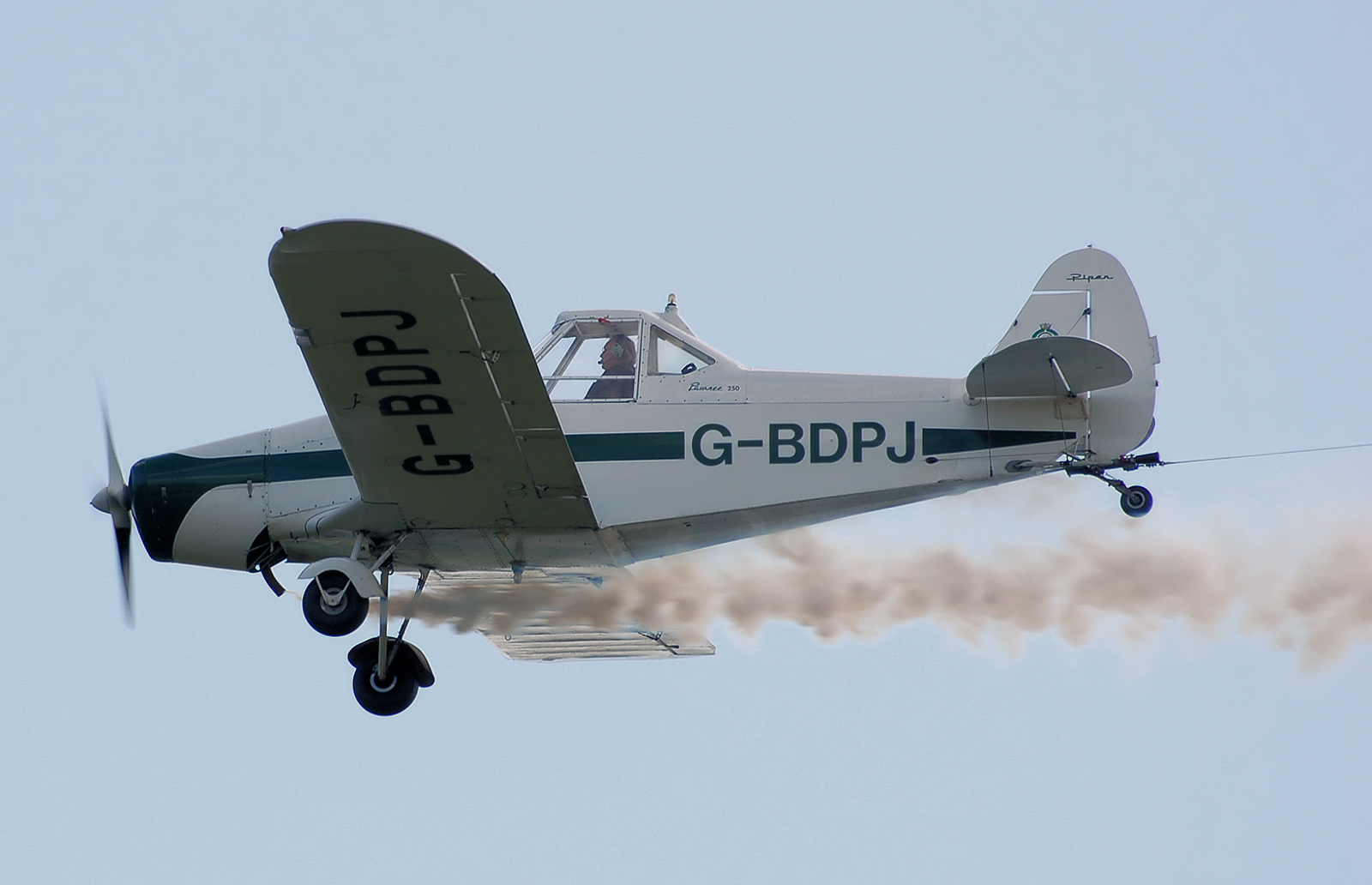
PA-25-235 Pawnee B towing a glider

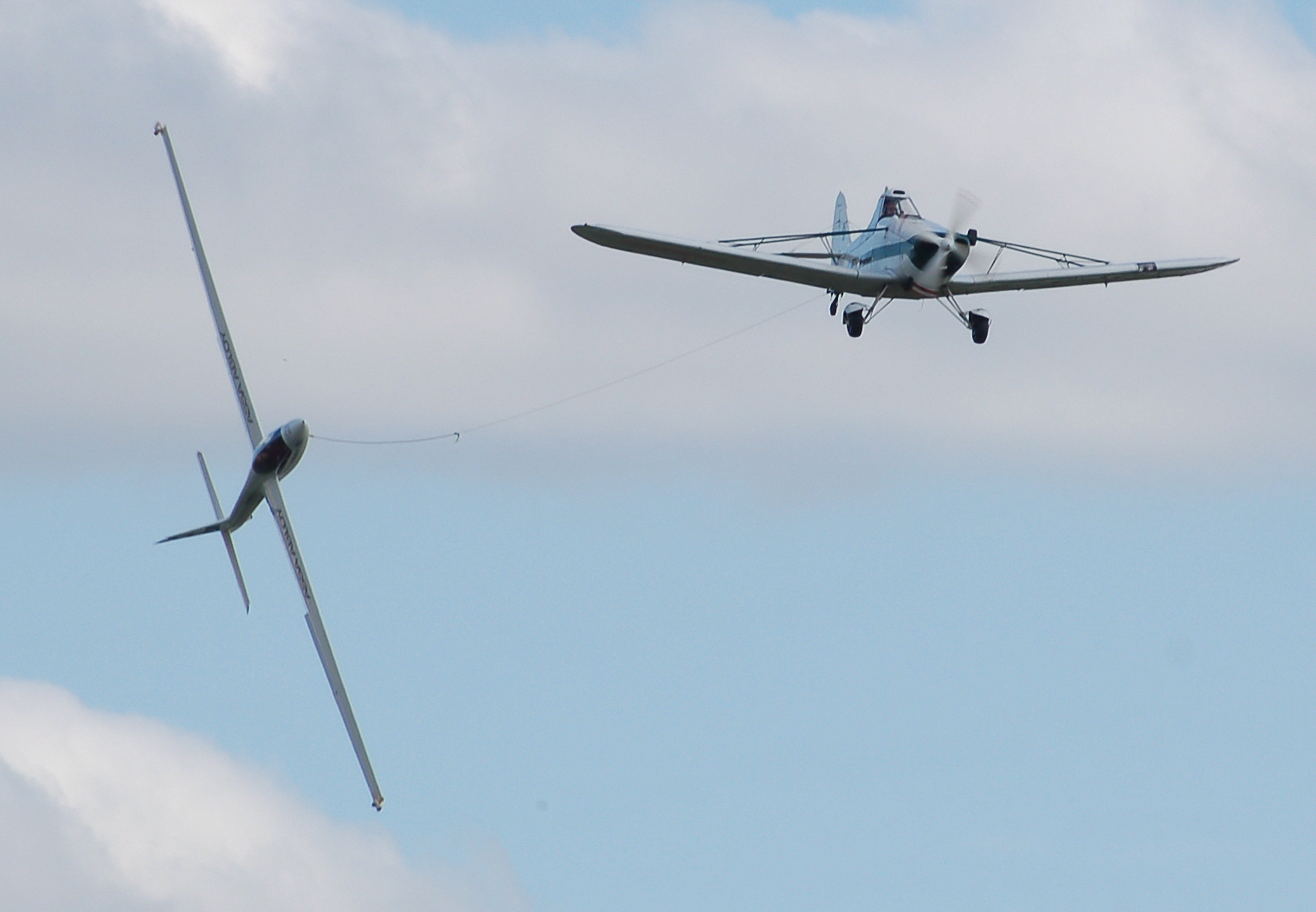
The Swift Aerobatic Display Team at Kemble Battle of Britain Weekend 2009. A Swift glider is performing continuous full rolls while being towed by a Pawnee

AG-3
Prototype built at Texas A&M University.
PA-25-150 Pawnee
Initial production version fitted with a 150 hp (110 kW) Lycoming O-320 engine. Payload of 800 lb (360 kg) powders or 145 US gal (121 imp gal; 550 L) liquids.
PA-25-235 Pawnee B
Fitted with a 235 hp (175 kW) Lycoming O-540-B2B5 six-cylinder engine. The Pawnee B featured a larger hopper and an increased payload of 1,200 lb (540 kg).
PA-25-235 and PA-25-260 Pawnee C
The Pawnee C was an upgraded version of the 'B' model and was available with a 235hp or a 260hp high compression version of the O-540 engine and either a fixed pitch or constant speed propeller. The fuselage of the Pawnee C featured a quickly detachable 'turtledeck' panel to ease the rinsing out of spilt corrosive agents from the fuselage structure and to facilitate servicing and inspection of components housed in the rear section of the fuselage.
PA-25-235 and PA-25-260 Pawnee D
The Pawnee D was also powered by a Lycoming O-540 of 260hp but featured fuel tanks fitted in the outer wings and metal covered ailerons and flaps. From 1980 it was known as the PA-25-235 Pawnee.
eTug
A modified PA-25 powered by a General Motors LS automotive engine driving a three-bladed propeller. Other differences include a belted propeller speed reduction unit.
Laviasa PA-25 Puelche 235
Improved version of Pawnee built by Latino Americana de Aviación in Argentina. Powered by 235 hp (175 kW) Textron Lycoming O-540-B2C5.
Laviasa PA-25 Puelche 260
Powered by 260 hp (190 kW) O-540-G2A5 engine.
Laviasa Puelche Trainer
Two seat trainer version of Puelche 235 with side-by-side seating.

== Accidents and incidents ==
- 9 August 1974 a crop-spraying Pawnee was involved in a fatal mid-air collision in Norfolk, UK with a Royal Air Force McDonnell Douglas F-4M Phantom FGR.2.

== Specifications (PA-25-235 Pawnee B) ==
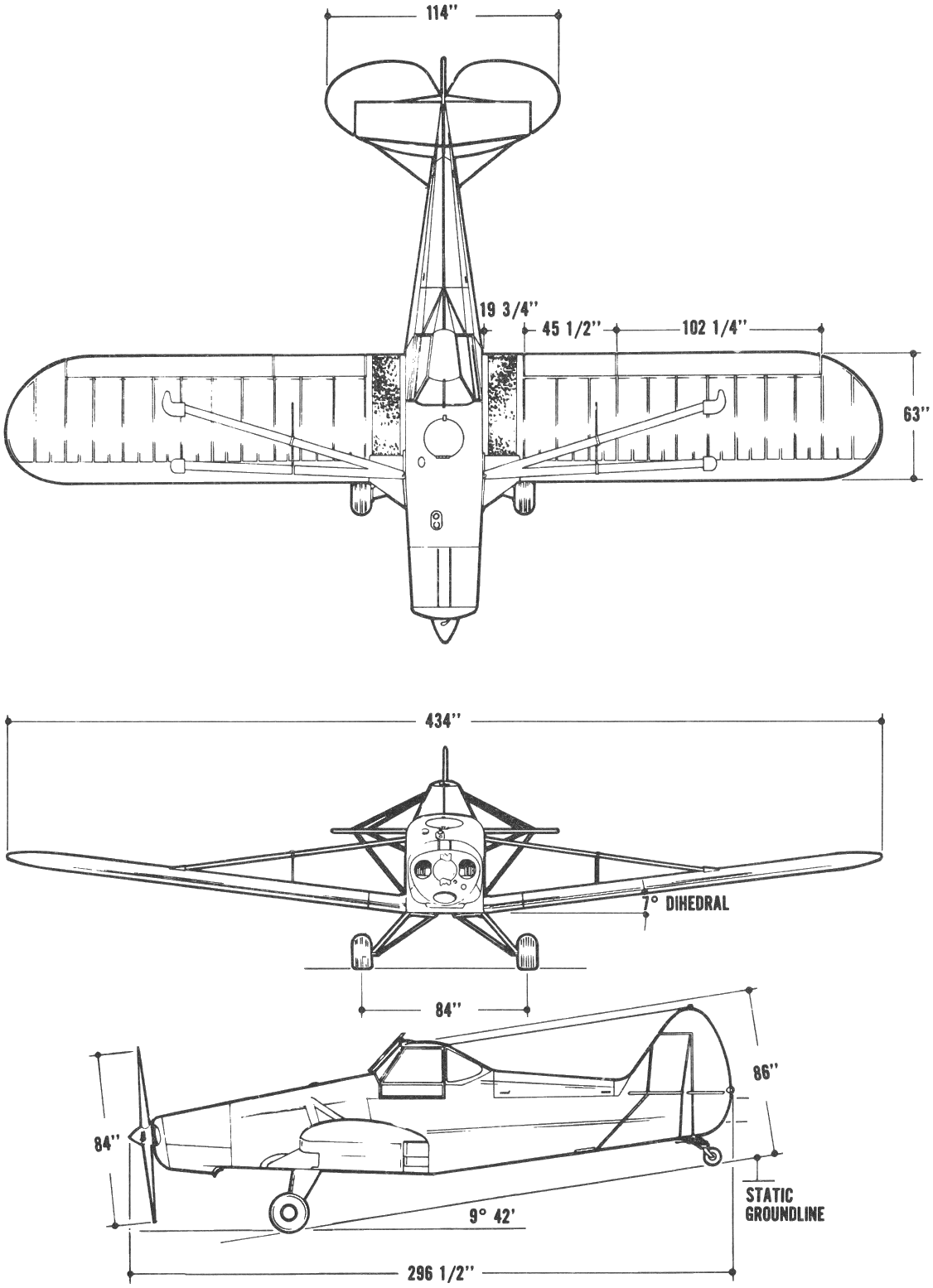
3-view line drawing of the Piper PA-25 Pawnee C

Data from Jane's All the World's Aircraft 1965–66

General characteristics

- Crew: 1
- Capacity: 150 US gal (120 imp gal; 570 L) or 1,200 lb (540 kg) powder
- Length: 24 ft 7 in (7.49 m)
- Wingspan: 36 ft 2 in (11.02 m)
- Height: 7 ft 2 in (2.18 m)
- Wing area: 183 sq ft (17.0 m^{2})
- Aspect ratio: 7.15:1
- Airfoil: USA 35B (modified)
- Empty weight: 1,488 lb (675 kg)
- Max takeoff weight: 2,900 lb (1,315 kg)
- Fuel capacity: 40 US gal (33 imp gal; 150 L)
- Powerplant: 1 × Lycoming O-540-B2B5 air-cooled six-cylinder horizontally-opposed engine, 235 hp (175 kW)
- Propellers: 2-bladed McCauley 1A200/FA84 metal fixed-pitch propeller, 7 ft 0 in (2.13 m) diameter

Performance

- Maximum speed: 110 mph (180 km/h, 96 kn) at sea level
- Cruise speed: 100 mph (160 km/h, 87 kn) (75% power)
- Stall speed: 61 mph (98 km/h, 53 kn) (flaps down)
- Range: 300 mi (480 km, 260 nmi) (75% power, full fuel)
- Service ceiling: 13,000 ft (4,000 m)
- Rate of climb: 630 ft/min (3.2 m/s)
- Take-off run to 50 ft (15 m): 1,370 ft (420 m)
- Landing distance from 50 ft (15 m): 1,350 ft (410 m)

== See also ==
Related development:

- Texas A&M College AG-1
- Gippsland Aeronautics PA-25-235/A9 'Fatman'
- Piper PA-36 Pawnee Brave

Comparable aircraft:

- Aero Boero 260AG
- Air Tractor AT-300
- Air Tractor AT-802
- Ayres Thrush
- CallAir A-9
- Cessna 188 AgWagon
- Embraer EMB-202 "Ipanema"
- Grumman Ag Cat
- PZL-106 Kruk
- PZL-Mielec M-18 Dromader
- Zlin Z-37 Čmelák

== Bibliography ==
- Bridgman, Leonard (1958). Jane's All the World's Aircraft 1958–59. London: Sampson Low, Marston & Company, Ltd.
- Goodrum, Alastair (January–February 2004). "Down Range: Losses over the Wash in the 1960s and 1970s". Air Enthusiast (109): 12–17. ISSN 0143-5450.
- Green, William. Aircraft Handbook. London. Macdonald & Co. (Publishers) Ltd., 1964.
- Jackson, Paul, ed. (2008). Jane's All the World's Aircraft 208–2009. Coulsdon, UK: Jane's Information Group. ISBN 978-0-7106-28374.
- Peperell, Roger and Smith, Colin. Piper Aircraft and their forerunners Tonbridge, Kent, England Air-Britain 1987. ISBN 0 85130 149 5
- Taylor, John W. R. Jane's All the World's Aircraft 1962–63. London: Sampson Low, Marston & Company, Ltd., 1962.
- Taylor, John W. R. (1965). Jane's All the World's Aircraft 1965–66. London: Sampson Low, Marston & Company, Ltd.
