= Piper PA-36 Pawnee Brave =

1970s American agricultural plane

PA-36 Pawnee Brave
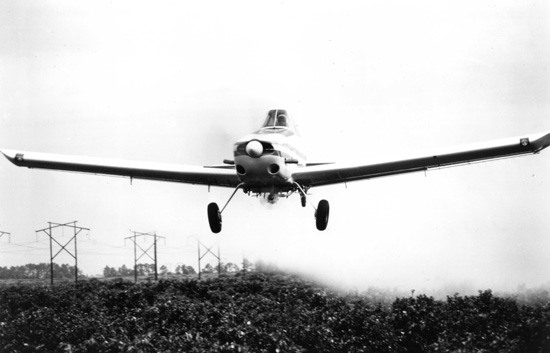

General information
- Type: Agricultural plane
- Manufacturer: Piper Aircraft
- Number built: 938 (Piper-built)

History
- Manufactured: 1973–1981
- Introduction date: 1973
- First flight: 5 December 1969
- Developed from: Piper PA-25 Pawnee

The Piper PA-36 Pawnee Brave is a 1970s American single-engined, low-wing, propeller-driven agricultural plane built by Piper Aircraft.

== Design and development ==
The PA-36 was first announced in 1972 as a new version of the PA-25 Pawnee with a more powerful 285 hp Continental Tiara 6-285 flat-six engine. The aircraft had a new wing with removable leading edges; improved ventilation and heating system; "Safoam" anti-sloshing compound in the fuel tanks; and a larger standard hopper of 30 ft³ (0.85m³). An optional 38 ft³ (1.08 m³) hopper was also available. The type entered service in 1973.

In 1977, a new version became available with a 300 hp (224 kW) Lycoming IO-540-K1G5 engine. The new model was called the PA-36 Pawnee Brave 300 while the original aircraft was redesignated the PA-36 Pawnee Brave 285. In 1978, the Brave 300 became the standard model and another more powerful model was introduced, the PA-36 Brave 375 with a 375 hp (280 kW) Lycoming IO-720-D1CD flat-eight engine.

In 1981, Piper sold the rights in the design to WTA Incorporated, which marketed two versions from 1982 with 375 hp and 400 hp (298 kW) engines as the New Brave 375 and New Brave 400 respectively. It had built a total of 150 New Braves by 1987.

In October 1997, the rights were assigned to The New Piper Aircraft, Inc.

== Variants ==
PA-36 Pawnee II
Prototype powered by a 260hp Lycoming engine
PA-36-285 Pawnee Brave
Production version, powered by a 285 hp Continental Tiara 6-285 piston engine.
PA-36-300 Pawnee Brave 300
Pawnee Brave with a 300 hp Lycoming IO-540-K1G5 engine, from 1978 named the Brave 300.
PA-36-375 Brave 375
Variant with a 375 hp Avco Lycoming IO-720-D1CD engine.
PA-36 New Brave 375
WTA-built variant powered by a 375 hp piston engine.
PA-36 New Brave 400
WTA-built variant powered by a 400 hp piston engine.

== Specifications (New Brave 375) ==
Data from Jane's All The World's Aircraft 1988–89

General characteristics

- Crew: 1
- Capacity: 38 cu ft (1.08 m^{3})
  - 275 US gal (229 imp gal; 1,040 L) liquids or
  - 2,200 lb (1,000 kg) dry chemicals
- Length: 27 ft 6 in (8.38 m)
- Wingspan: 38 ft 9 1/2 in (11.824 m)
- Height: 7 ft 6 in (2.29 m)
- Wing area: 225.65 sq ft (20.964 m^{2})
- Aspect ratio: 6.7:1
- Airfoil: NACA 63_{3}-618
- Empty weight: 2,465 lb (1,118 kg)
- Max takeoff weight: 4,800 lb (2,177 kg)
- Fuel capacity: 86 US gal (72 imp gal; 330 L) usable fuel
- Powerplant: 1 × Avco Lycoming IO-720-D1C flat-eight air-cooled piston engine, 375 hp (280 kW)
- Propellers: 3-bladed Hartzell constant-speed propeller, 7 ft 2 in (2.18 m) diameter

Performance

- Maximum speed: 142 mph (229 km/h, 123 kn) (crop sprayer)
- Cruise speed: 136 mph (219 km/h, 118 kn)
- Range: 452 mi (727 km, 393 nmi)
- Rate of climb: 920 ft/min (4.7 m/s)
- Takeoff run to 50 ft (15 m): 1,500 ft (460 m)
- Landing run from 50 ft (15 m): 1,440 ft (440 m)

== See also ==
Related development

- Piper PA-25 Pawnee
