= Embraer EMB 314 Super Tucano =

Light ground attack and training aircraft

EMB 314 / A-29 Super Tucano
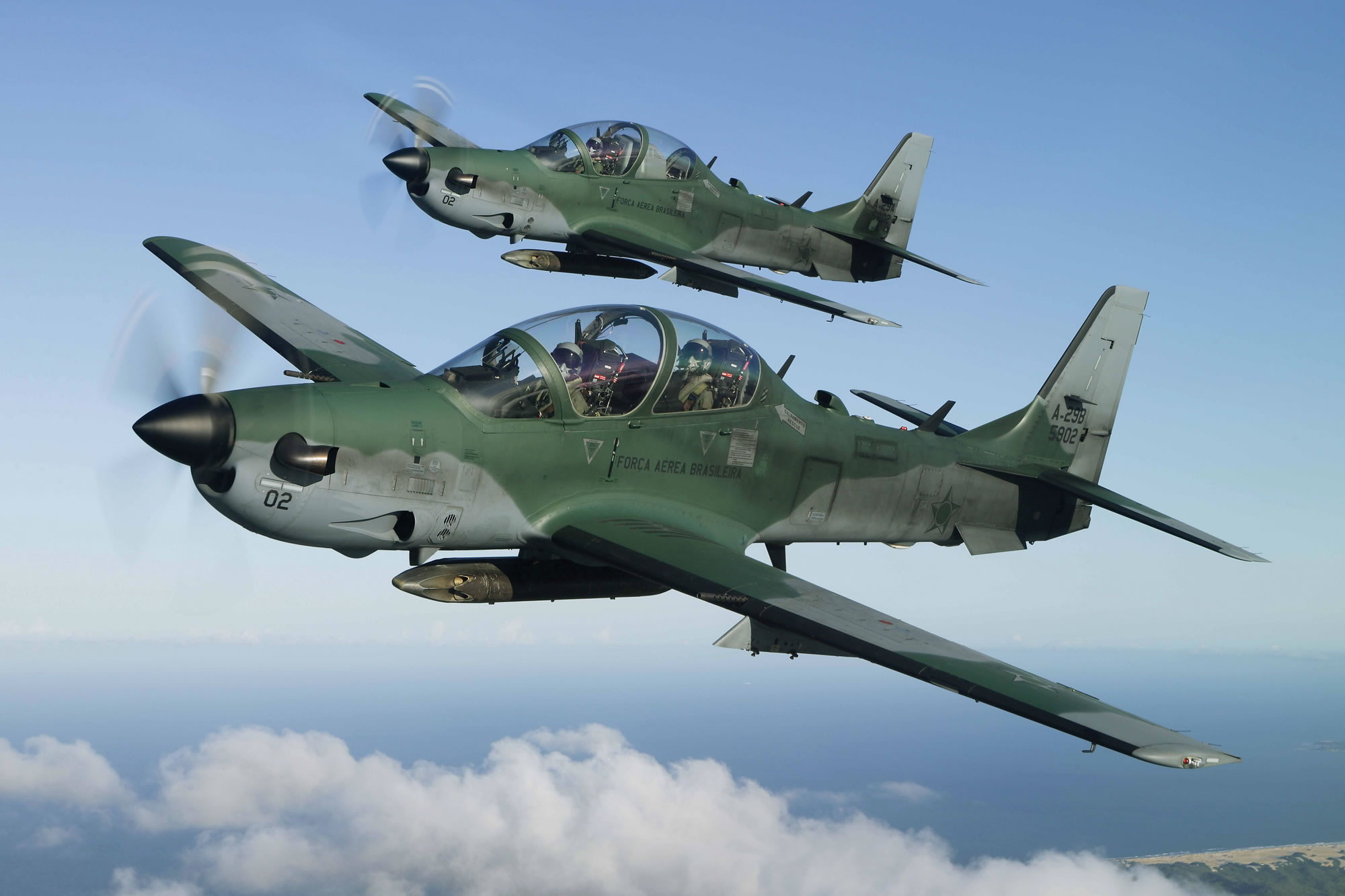
- A-29 Super Tucanos of the Brazilian Air Force

General information
- Type: Light attack and counter-insurgency aircraft
- National origin: Brazil
- Manufacturer: Embraer Defense and Security
- Status: In service
- Primary users: Brazilian Air Force Colombian Aerospace Force; Chilean Air Force; Ecuadorian Air Force; Dominican Air Force
- Number built: 260+ (April 2023)

History
- Manufactured: 2003–present
- Introduction date: 2003
- First flight: 2 June 1999
- Developed from: Embraer EMB 312 Tucano

The Embraer EMB 314 Super Tucano (lit. 'Super Toucan'), also named ALX or A-29, is a Brazilian turboprop light attack and counter-insurgency aircraft designed and built by Embraer as a development of the Embraer EMB 312 Tucano. The A-29 Super Tucano carries a wide variety of weapons, including precision-guided munitions, and was designed to be a low-cost system operated in low-threat environments.

In addition to production in Brazil, Embraer assembles A-29 Super Tucanos in Jacksonville, Florida, in partnership with Sierra Nevada Corporation, for American and Foreign Military Sales customers. In Portugal, Embraer and the Portuguese State have signed a letter of intent for the potential establishment of an A-29N final assembly line; the first Portuguese A-29Ns were delivered at OGMA's facilities.

== Design and development ==
During the mid-1980s, Embraer was working on the Short Tucano alongside a new version designated the EMB-312G1, carrying the same Garrett engine. The EMB-312G1 prototype flew for the first time in July 1986. However, the project was dropped because the Brazilian Air Force was not interested in it. Nonetheless, the lessons from recent combat use of the aircraft in Peru and Venezuela led Embraer to keep up the studies. Besides a trainer, it researched a helicopter attack version designated "helicopter killer" or EMB-312H.

The study was connected to Embraer's unsuccessful bid, with Northrop, for the US military Joint Primary Aircraft Training System program. A proof-of-concept prototype flew for the first time in September 1991. The aircraft features a 1.37 m (4.5 ft) fuselage extension with the addition of sections before and after of the cockpit to restore its center of gravity and stability, a strengthened airframe, cockpit pressurization, and a stretched nose to house the more powerful PT6A-67R (1,424 shp or 1,062 kW) engine. Two new prototypes with the PT6A-68A (1,250 shp or 930 kW) engine were built in 1993. The second prototype flew for the first time in May 1993, and the third prototype flew in October 1993.

The request for a light attack aircraft was part of the Brazilian government's Amazon Surveillance System project. This aircraft would fly with the R-99A and R-99B aircraft then in service, intercept illegal flights, and patrol Brazil's borders. The ALX project was then created by the Brazilian Air Force, which needed a military trainer to replace the Embraer EMB 326GB Xavante. The new aircraft was to be suited to the Amazon region, with high temperature, moisture, and precipitation, and a low military threat. The ALX was specified as a turboprop engine plane with a long range and autonomy, able to operate night and day, in any meteorological conditions, and able to land on short airfields lacking infrastructure.

In August 1995, the Brazilian Ministry of Aeronautics awarded Embraer a $50 million contract for ALX development. Two EMB-312Hs were updated to serve as ALX prototypes. These made their initial flights in their new configuration in 1996 and 1997, respectively. The initial flight of a production-configured ALX, further modified from one of the prototypes, occurred on 2 June 1999. The second prototype was brought up to a two-seater configuration and performed its first flight on 22 October 1999. The changes were so considerable that the type was given a new designation, the EMB-314 Super Tucano. The total cost of the aircraft development was quoted to be between US$200 million and US$300 million.

The aircraft differs from the baseline EMB-312 Tucano trainer aircraft in several respects. It is powered by a more powerful 1,600 shp (1,200 kW) Pratt & Whitney Canada PT6A-68C engine (compared to the EMB-312's 750 shp (560 kW) powerplant); has a strengthened airframe to sustain higher g loads and increase fatigue life to 8,000–12,000 hours in operational environments; a reinforced landing gear to handle greater takeoff weights and heavier stores load, up to 1,550 kilograms (3,420 lb); Kevlar armour protection; and two internal, wing-mounted .50 cal. machine guns, with 200 rounds of ammunition each.

It has the capacity to carry ordnance on five weapon hardpoints, including Giat NC621 20 mm cannon pods, Mk 81/82 bombs, MAA-1 Piranha air-to-air missiles (AAMs), BLG-252 cluster bombs, and SBAT-70/19 or LAU-68A/G rocket pods on its underwing stations; and has a night-vision goggle-compatible "glass cockpit" with hands-on-throttle-and-stick (HOTAS) controls; provision for a datalink; a video camera and recorder; an embedded mission-planning capability; forward-looking infrared; chaff/flare dispensers; missile approach warning receiver systems and radar warning receivers; and zero-zero ejection seats. The structure is corrosion-protected. The side-hinged canopy has a windshield able to withstand bird strike impacts up to 270 kn (500 km/h; 310 mph).

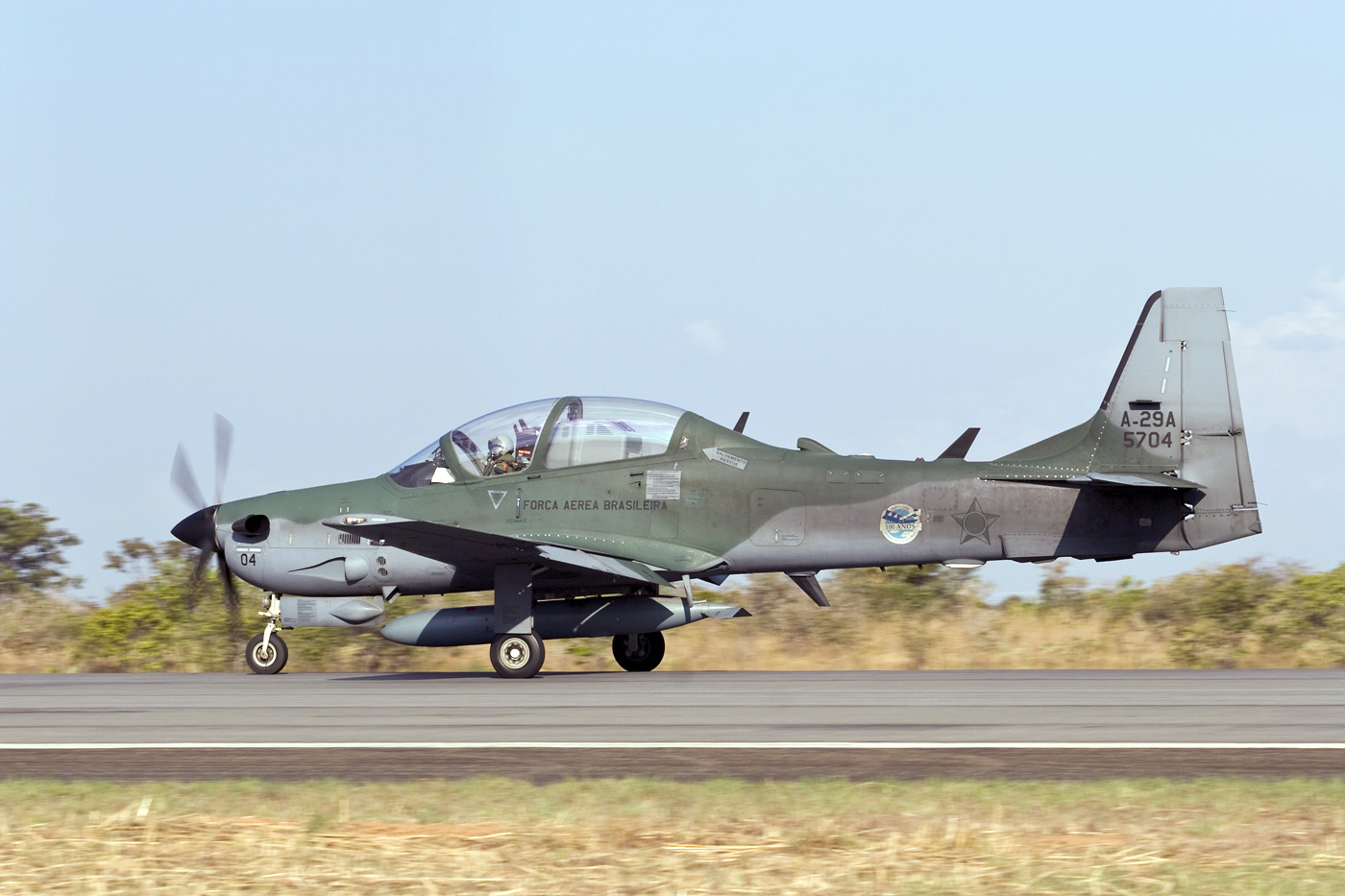
The A-29A incorporates an additional tank for 400 litres (88 imp gal; 110 US gal) of fuel.

In 1996, Embraer selected the Israeli firm Elbit Systems to supply the mission avionics for the ALX. For this contract, Elbit was chosen over GEC-Marconi and Sextant Avionique. The Israeli company supplies such equipment as the mission computer, head-up displays, and navigation and stores management systems.

In October 2010, the Super Tucano A-29B passed 48,000 hours of full-scale wing-fuselage structural fatigue tests, conducted since July 2005 by the Aeronautical Systems Division, part of the Aeronautics and Space Institute at the Structural Testing Laboratory. The tests involve a complex system of hydraulics and tabs that apply pressure to the aircraft structure, simulating air pressure from flying at varying altitudes. The simulation continued for another year to complete the engine-fatigue life test and crack-propagation studies for a damage-tolerance analysis program of conducted by Embraer and the Aeronautics and Space Institute.

Embraer developed an advanced training and support system suite called Training Operational Support System (TOSS) an integrated computational tool composed of four systems: computer-based training enabling the student to rehearse the next sortie on a computer simulation; an aviation mission planning station, which uses the three-dimensional (3D) visuals to practice planned missions and to check intervisibility between aircraft and from aircraft and other entities; a mission debriefing station employing real aircraft data to play back missions for review and analysis; and a flight simulator. MPS and MDS was enhanced with MAK's 3D visualization solution to support airforces pre-existing data, including GIS, Web-based servers and a plug-in for custom terrain formats.

In 2012, Boeing Defense, Space & Security was selected to integrate the Joint Direct Attack Munition and Small Diameter Bomb to the Super Tucano. In 2013, Embraer Defense and Security disclosed that its subsidiary, OrbiSat, was developing a new radar for the Super Tucano. A Colombian general said that a future modernization could include an advanced side-looking synthetic-aperture radar capable of locating ground targets smaller than a car.

In April 2023, the manufacturer announced the A-29N, a variant intended for NATO nations. The A-29N will include NATO-required equipment, data link communications and be fitted for single-pilot operation. Available simulators used for training will incorporate virtual reality, augmented reality and mixed reality technology.

In November 2024, the Brazilian Air Force announced a contract with Embraer for the modernization of 68 aircraft to the new A-29M standard, which includes some capabilities of fourth and fifth generation aircraft such as the inclusion of a data link, new digital head-up display, expansion of the range of guided weapons, integration of a helmet-mounted display, the installation of chaff and flares, laser rangefinder and finally a wide-area display similar to those of the new Brazilian Saab JAS-39 Gripen fighters. In April 2025, Embraer announced modifications to enhance anti-drone capabilities of the aircraft.

== Operational history ==
=== Afghanistan ===
In 2011, the Super Tucano was declared the winner of the US Light Air Support contract competition over the Hawker Beechcraft AT-6B Texan II. The contract was cancelled in 2012 citing Hawker Beechcraft's appeal when its proposal was disqualified during the procurement process, but rewon in 2013. Twenty of these light attack aircraft were purchased for the Afghan Air Force (AAF). The first four aircraft arrived in Afghanistan in January 2016, with a further four due before the end of 2016. Combat-ready Afghan A-29 pilots graduated from training at Moody Air Force Base, Georgia, and returned to Afghanistan to represent the first of 30 pilots trained by the 81st Fighter Squadron at Moody AFB. A fleet of 20 A-29s would be in place by 2018, according to a senior U.S. defense official. The Pentagon purchased the Super Tucanos in a $427 million contract with Sierra Nevada Corp. and Embraer, with the aircraft produced at Embraer's facility on the grounds of Jacksonville International Airport in Jacksonville, Florida.

The first four aircraft arrived at Hamid Karzai International Airport on 15 January 2016. Prior to the A-29's delivery, the Afghan Air Force lacked close air support aircraft other than attack helicopters. In 2017, the AAF conducted roughly 2,000 airstrike sorties, about 40 a week. The AAF had a record high in October with more than 80 missions in a single week. By March 2018, the AAF had 12 A-29s in service. On 22 March 2018, the AAF deployed a GBU-58 Paveway II 250 lb (113.4 kg) bomb from an A-29 in combat, marking the first time the service had dropped a laser-guided weapon against the Taliban.

==== Fall of Kabul ====
In August 2021, during the 2021 Taliban offensive and the Fall of Kabul, some Afghan pilots fled the country, taking an unknown number of aircraft, including A-29s, with them. An Afghan Air Force A-29 crashed in Uzbekistan's Surxondaryo Region; two pilots ejected and landed with parachutes. Initially it was reported shot down by Uzbekistan air defenses, then the Prosecutor General's office in Uzbekistan issued a statement saying that an Afghan military plane had collided mid-air with an Uzbekistan Air Force MiG-29, finally it retracted the statement about the mid-air collision. At least one Super Tucano was captured by the Taliban in the Mazar-i-Sharif International Airport.

=== Brazil ===
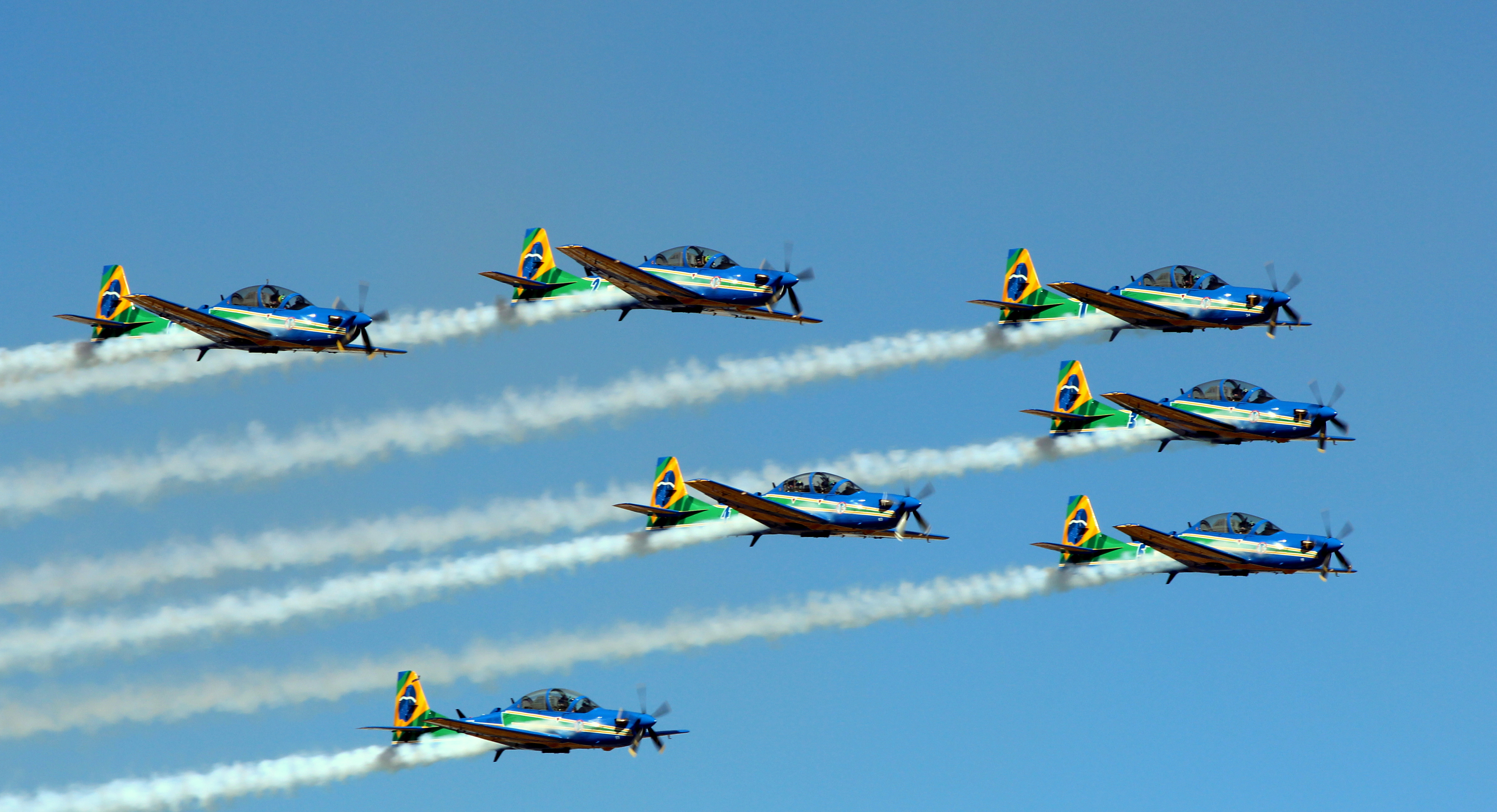
Smoke Squadron EMB-314

In August 2001, the Brazilian Air Force awarded Embraer a contract for 76 Super Tucano / ALX aircraft with options for a further 23. A total of 99 aircraft were acquired from a contract estimated to be worth U$214.1 million; 66 of these aircraft are two-seater versions, designated A-29B. The remaining 33 aircraft are the single-seat A-29 ALX version. The first aircraft was delivered in December 2003. By September 2007, 50 aircraft had entered service. The 99th, and last, aircraft was delivered in June 2012.

==== Sivam programme ====
One of the aircraft's main missions is border patrol under the Sivam programme, particularly to act against drug trafficking activities. On 3 June 2009, two Brazilian Air Force A-29s, guided by an Embraer E-99, intercepted a Cessna U206G inbound from Bolivia in the region of Alta Floresta d'Oeste; after exhausting all procedures, one of the A-29s fired a warning shot from its 12.7 mm machine guns, after which the Cessna followed the A-29s to Cacoal airport. This incident was the first use of powers granted under the Shoot-Down Act, which was enacted in October 2004 to legislate for the downing of illegal flights. A total of 176 kg of pure cocaine base paste, enough to produce almost a ton of cocaine, was discovered on board the Cessna; the two occupants attempted a ground escape but were arrested by federal police in Pimenta Bueno.

==== Operation Ágata ====
On 5 August 2011, Brazil started Operation Ágata, part of a major "Frontiers Strategic Plan" launched in June, with almost 30 continuous days of rigorous military activity in the region of Brazil's border with Colombia; it mobilized 35 aircraft and more than 3,000 military personnel of the Brazilian Army, Brazilian Navy, and Brazilian Air Force surveillance against drug trafficking, illegal mining and logging, and trafficking of wild animals. A-29s of 1 / 3º Aviation Group (GAV), Squadron Scorpion, launched a strike upon an illicit airstrip, deploying eight 230 kg (500 lb) computer-guided Mk 82 bombs to render the airstrip unusable.

Multiple RQ-450 UAVs and several E-99s were assigned for night operations to locate remote jungle airstrips used by drug smuggling gangs along the border. The RQ-450s located targets for the A-29s, allowing them to bomb the airstrips with a high level of accuracy using night vision systems and computer systems calculating the impact points of munitions.

==== Operation Ágata 2 ====
On 15 September 2011, Brazil launched the Operation Ágata 2 on the borders with Uruguay, Argentina, and Paraguay. Part of this border is the infamous Triple Frontier. A-29s from Maringá, Dourados, and Campo Grande, and Brazilian upgraded Northrop F-5 Tiger II/F-5EMs from Canoas, intercepted a total of 33 aircraft during Operation Ágata 2 in this area. Brazilian forces seized 62 tons of narcotics, made 3,000 arrests, and destroyed three illicit airstrips, while over 650 tons of weapons and explosives have been seized.

==== Operation Ágata 3 ====
On 22 November 2011, Brazil launched the Operation Ágata 3 on the borders with Bolivia, Peru, and Paraguay. It involved 6,500 personnel, backed by 10 ships and 200 land patrol vehicles, in addition to 70 aircraft, including fighter, transport, and reconnaissance aircraft; it was the largest Brazilian coordinated action involving the Army, Navy, and Air Force against illegal trafficking and organized crime, along a border strip of almost 7,000 km. A-1 (AMX), Northrop F-5 Tiger II/ F-5EM and A-29s from Tabatinga, Campo Grande, Cuiabá, Vilhena, and Porto Velho were employed in defending air space, supported by airborne early warning and control E-99, equipped with a 450-km-range radar capable of detecting low-flying aircraft, and R-99, remote sensing and surveillance. On 7 December 2011, Brazilian Ministry of Defence informed that drug seizures were up by 1,319% over the last six months, compared to prior six months.

=== Chile ===
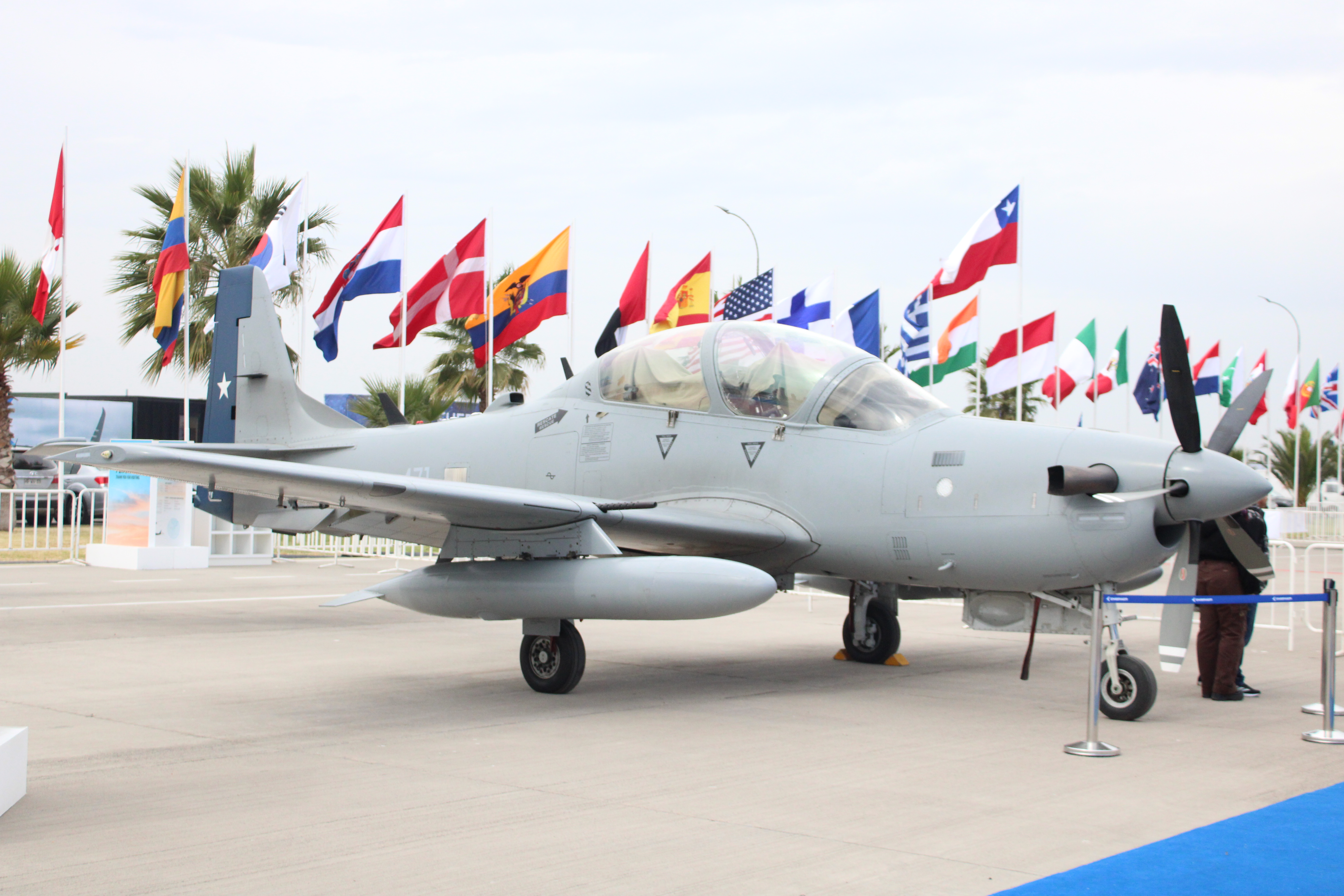
A Chilean Air Force A-29B

In August 2008, the Chilean Air Force signed a contract valued at $120 million for 12 A-29Bs. The contract includes a broad integrated logistic support package and an advanced training and operation support system (TOSS), covering not only the aircraft, but also an integrated suite for ground support stations. The FACH's TOSS consists of three systems: a mission planning station in which instructor and student program all phases of flight, setting the various parameters of each phase along with navigation, communications, goals, and simulations; a mission debriefing station empowering students with the ability to review all and each flight aspects and phases, enabling to look at the errors and correct them for their next mission; and a flight simulator.

The first four A-29Bs arrived in December 2009 while further deliveries took place in the following year. They are based at Los Cóndores Air Base (45 km from Iquique) and are used for tactical instruction at the 1st Air Brigade for the Aviation Group #1, the fully digital cockpit allows students to do a smooth transition between the T-35 Pillán (basic trainer) and the F-16. In 2018, six additional A-29B, along with ground support equipment, arrived; four more units were received two years later.

=== Colombia ===
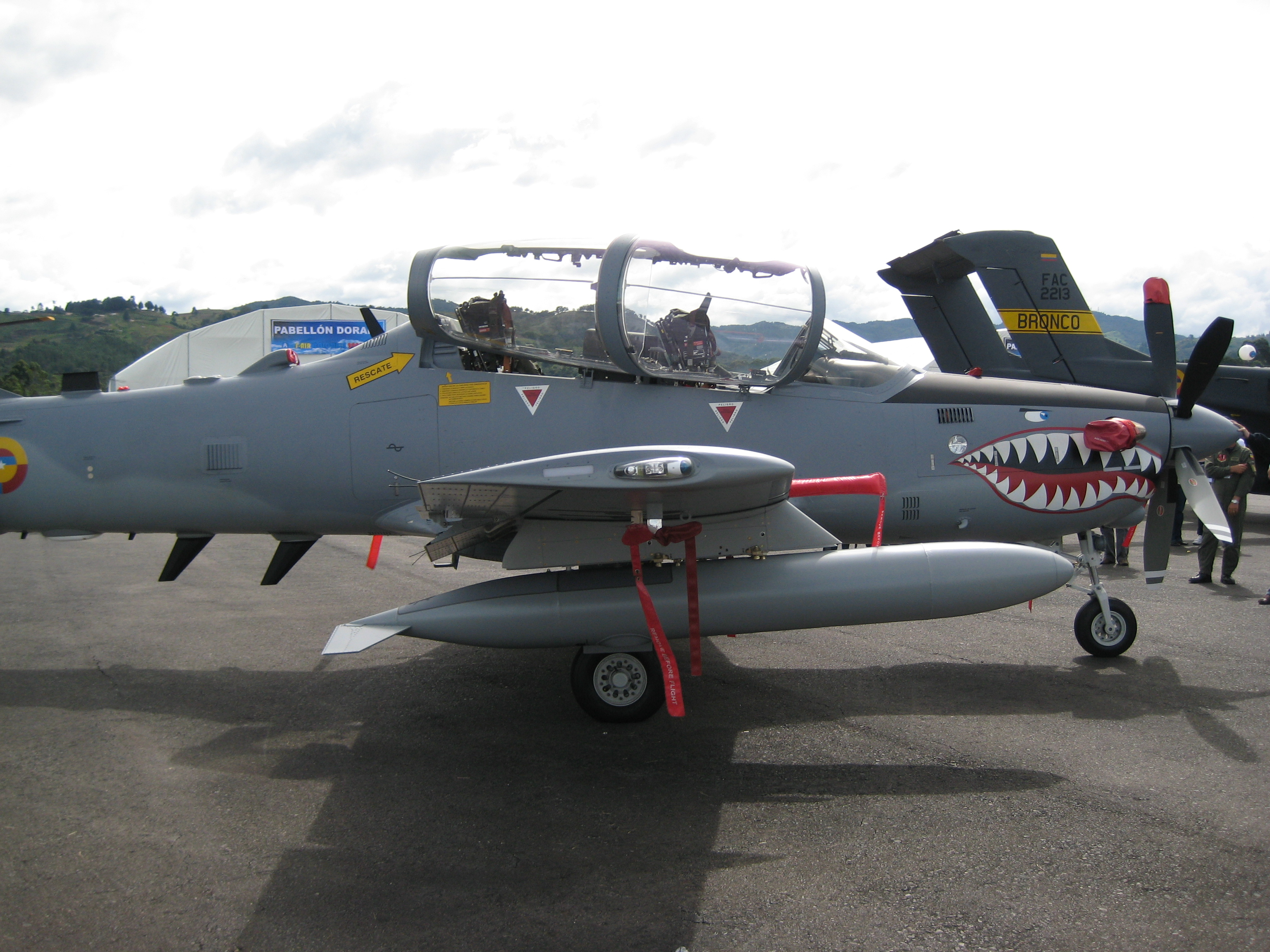
A-29 Super Tucano of the Colombian Aerospace Force

A total of 25 Super Tucanos (variant AT-29B) were purchased by the Colombian Air Force in a US$234 million deal, purchased directly from Embraer. On 14 December 2006, the first three aircraft arrived to the military airfield of CATAM in Bogotá; two more were delivered later that month, ten more in the first half of 2007, and the rest in June 2008.

On 18 January 2007, a squadron of Colombian Air Force Super Tucanos launched the first-ever combat mission of its type, attacking FARC positions in the jungle with Mark 82 bombs. This attack made use of the Super Tucano's constantly computed impact point capability; the aircraft's performance in action was a reported success.

On 11 July 2012, the first Super Tucano was lost near Jambaló in the Cauca Department during an anti-FARC operation; rebels claimed they shot it down with a .50 caliber (12.7 mm) machine gun, but the Colombian Air Force challenged the rebel group's claim after inspecting the wreckage.

In 2008, during "Operation Phoenix", a Colombian Air Force Super Tucano used Griffin laser-guided bombs to destroy a guerrilla cell inside Ecuador and kill the second-in-command chief of FARC, Raúl Reyes. This event led to a diplomatic break between the two countries. On 21 September 2010, Operation Sodoma in the Meta department began, 120 miles south of the capital Bogotá. FARC commander Mono Jojoy was killed in a massive military operation on 22 September, after 25 EMB-314s launched seven tonnes of explosives on the camp, while some 600 special forces troops descended by rope from helicopters, opposed by 700 guerrillas; 20 guerrillas died in the attack.

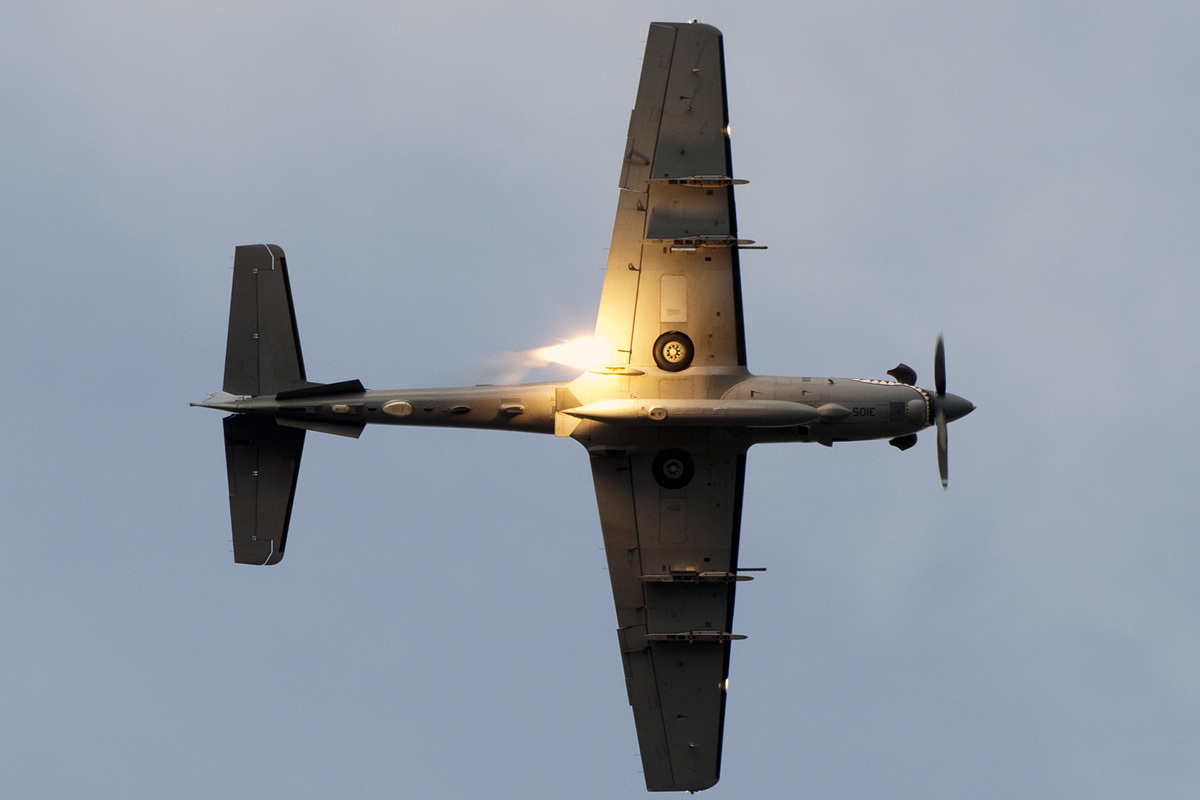
Colombian Super Tucano deploys flares.

On 2 October 2010, during Operation Darién, Super Tucanos used infrared cameras to spot and bombard the FARC 57th front in the Chocó Department, just a kilometer away from the Panama border. Five rebels, including several commanders, were killed. On 15 October 2011, Operation Odiseo started with a total of 969 members of the Colombian armed forces. A total of 18 aircraft participated in Operation Odiseo. On 4 November 2011, five Super Tucanos dropped 1000 lb (450 kg) and 250 lb (135 kg) bombs, plus high-precision smart bombs. This operation ended with the death of the leader of the Revolutionary Armed Forces of Colombia (Fuerzas Armadas Revolucionarias de Colombia, FARC), Alfonso Cano. It was biggest blow in the history of the guerrilla organization.

At dawn of 22 February 2012, EMB-314s identified the camp of FARC's 57th Front, 15 km (9.3 mi) north of Bojayá near the border with Panama. In Operation Frontera, Super Tucanos dropped two high-precision bombs, destroying the camp and killing six FARC rebels, including Pedro Alfonso Alvarado (alias "Mapanao"), who was responsible for the Bojayá massacre in 2002, in which 119 civilians were killed.

==== Espada de Honor War Plan ====
The Espada de Honor War Plan was an aggressive Colombian counterinsurgency strategy that aimed to dismantle FARC's structure, both militarily and financially. It targeted FARC leadership focusing on eliminating the 15 most powerful economic and military fronts.

During Operacion Faraón, at the dawn of 21 March 2012, five Super Tucanos bombarded the FARC's 10th Front guerrilla camp in Arauca, near the Venezuelan border, killing 33 rebels. Five days later, in Operation Armagedón, nine Super Tucanos from Apiay Air Base attacked the FARC's 27th front camp in Vista Hermosa, Meta, using coordinates received from a guerrilla informant recruited by the police intelligence, launching 40 guided 500-lb bombs within three minutes, destroying the camp and killing 36 rebels. In late May, Super Tucanos bombarded a National Liberation Army camp located in rural Santa Rosa at Bolívar Department. On 31 May 2012, a bombardment over the Western Front of the ELN at an inhospitable area of the Chocó Department killed seven rebels. On 6 June 2012, during a minute and half bombardment over FARC's 37th front located in northern Antioquia Department, five Super Tucanos dropped 250-kg bombs, killing eight rebels.

In September, Super Tucanos provided reconnaissance and close air support during an "Omega" operation, during which seven terrorists were gunned down and four were captured, including "Fredy Cooper", the 7th front's leader of the Public Order Company. On 5 September 2012, "Danilo Garcia", leader of the FARC's 33rd Front, was killed in a bombing raid; Danilo was considered "the right hand of supreme FARC leader alias Timochenko". Intelligence indicated that the bodies of 15 guerrillas may have been buried in the bombing. Eight A-29s carried out an air strike on 27 September during Operación Saturno at the FARC's 37th front camp in the northwest of Antioquia Department, resulting in the death of Efrain Gonzales Ruiz, "Pateñame", leader of the 35th and 37th fronts, and 13 others. In April 2013, two Super Tucanos bombarded the FARC's 59th front fort in Serranía del Perijá municipality Barrancas, La Guajira.

=== Dominican Republic ===
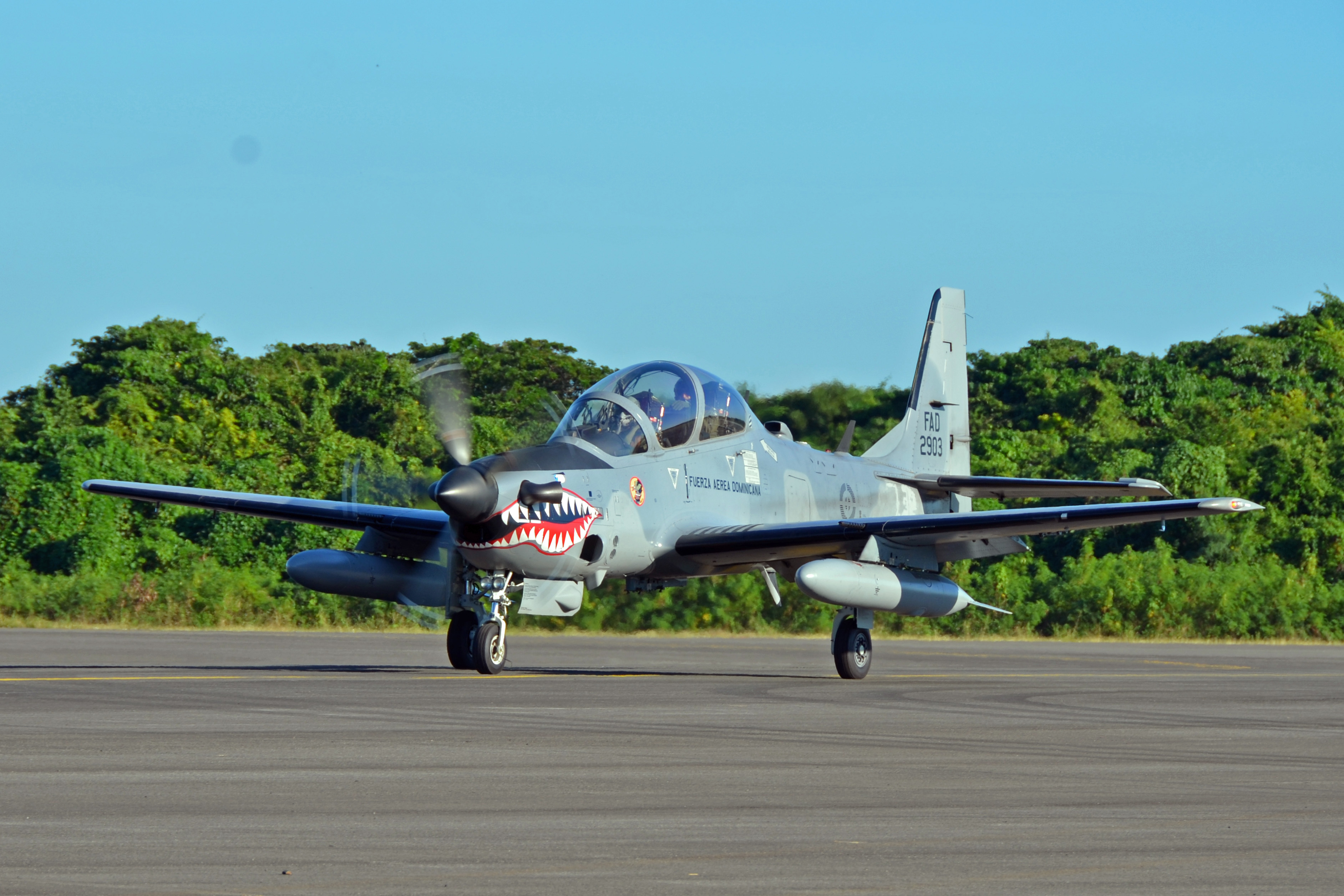
A Dominican Republic A-29 taxis after a mission as part of an exercise to combat illegal drug trafficking.

In August 2001, Embraer announced the signing of a contract with the Dominican Republic for 10 Super Tucanos, to use for pilot training, internal security, border patrol and counter-narcotics trafficking missions. The order was reduced to eight aircraft in January 2009, with the sale confirmed by Embraer that month. The first two aircraft were delivered in December 2009. Three more aircraft were received in July 2010, bringing the number received to five of the eight ordered. The Dominican Republic formally received all eight aircraft in October 2010.

In February 2011, Dominican Republic Air Force Chief of Operations Col. Hilton Cabral stated: "Since the introduction of the Super Tucano aircraft and ground-based radars, illicit air tracks into the Dominican Republic had dropped by over 80 percent." In August 2011, the Dominican Air Force said that since taking delivery of the Super Tucanos in 2009, it has driven away drug flights to the point that they no longer enter the country's airspace. In May 2012, the Dominican president Leonel Fernández gave a cooperative order for the armed forces to support a fleet of Super Tucanos for the antidrug fight on Haiti.

=== Ecuador ===
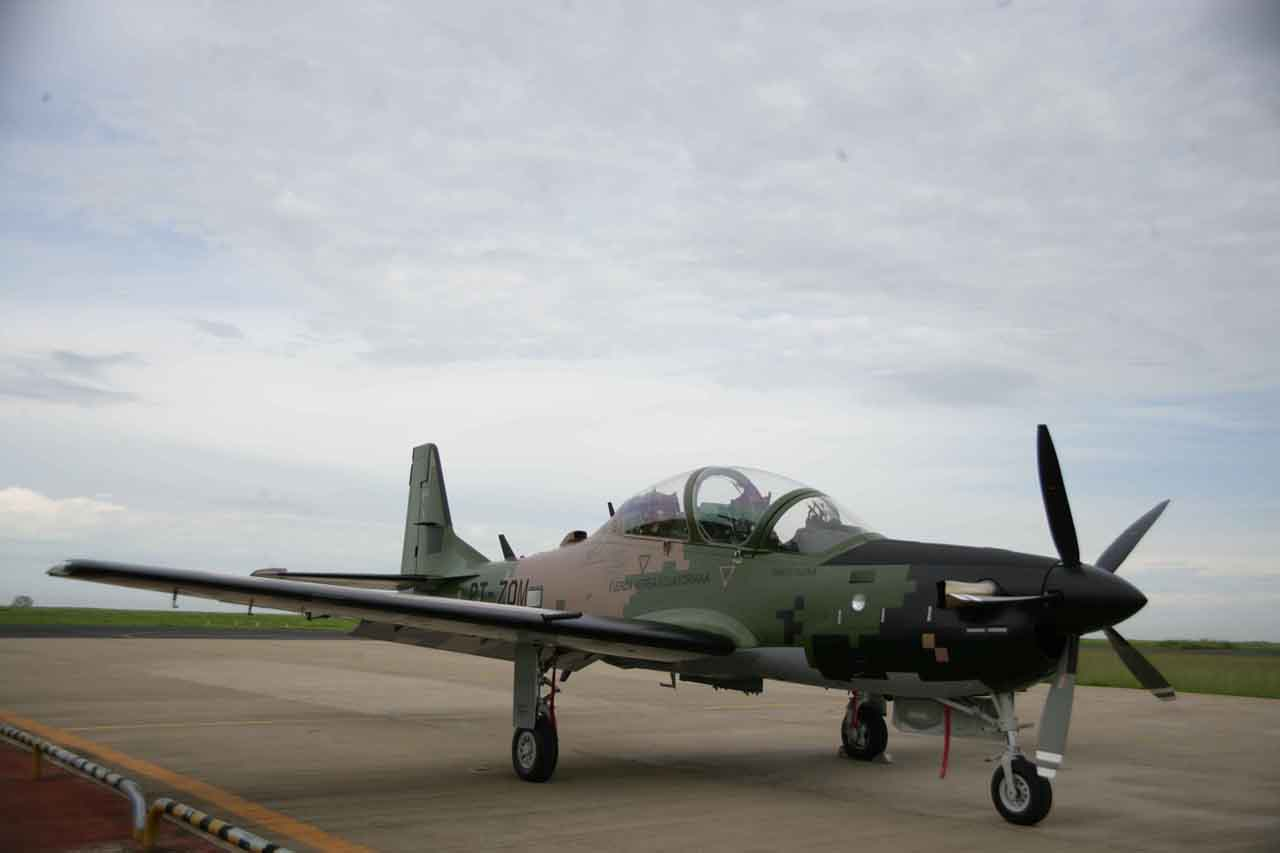
Super Tucano Ecuadorian Air Force

The Ecuadorian Air Force operates 18 Super Tucanos; they are established at Manta Air Base in two squadrons: 2313 "Halcones" (used for border surveillance and flight training) and 2311 "Dragones" (used for counterinsurgency). Ecuadorian Super Tucanos use the PT-6A-68A (1,300 shp) engine. On 23 March 2009, Embraer announced that negotiations over a nine-month-old agreement with the Ecuadorian Air Force had been completed. The deal covers the supply of 24 Super Tucanos to replace Ecuador's aging fleet of Vietnam-era Cessna A-37 Dragonfly strike aircraft, and help reassert control over the country's airspace.

In May 2010, after receiving its sixth Super Tucano under a $270 million contract, Ecuador announced a reduction in its order from 24 to 18 Super Tucanos to release funds to buy secondhand South African Air Force Denel Cheetah C fighters. By cutting its order for the EMB-314, the Defence Ministry says the accrued savings would better allow it to bolster the air force's flagging air defence component.

=== Honduras ===
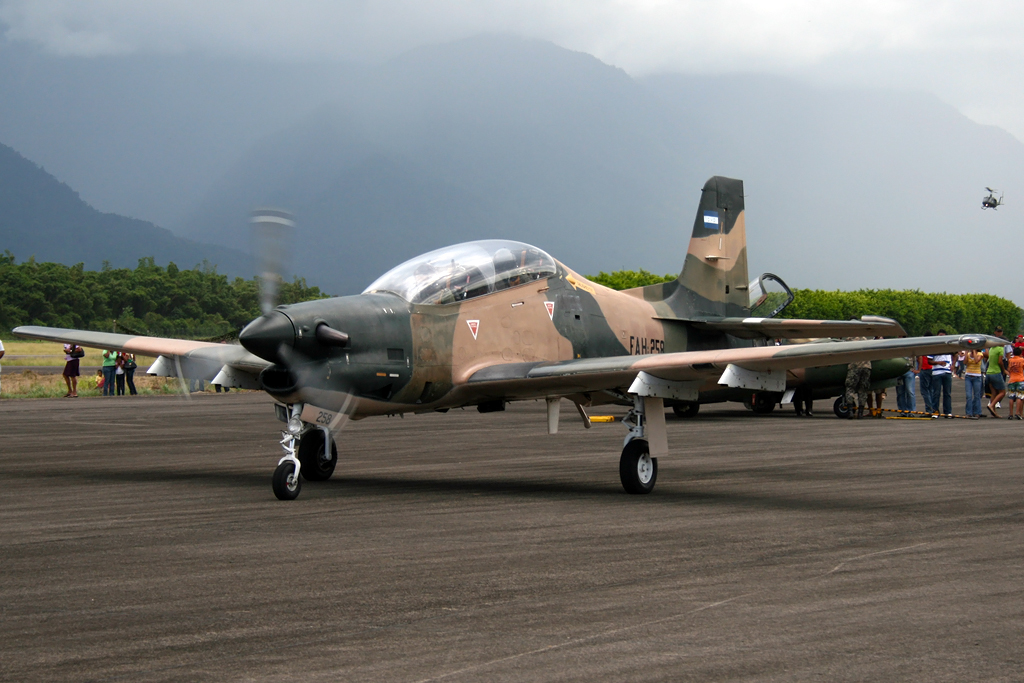
A Honduran Air Force T-27 Tucano

On 3 September 2011, the head of the Honduran Air Force (Fuerza Aérea Hondureña, or FAH), said that Honduras was to procure four Super Tucanos. On 7 February 2012, the Honduran government informed the Brazilian Trade Ministry of its interest in acquiring a large number of Super Tucanos. However, due to the economic situation, the government was forced to repair their aging aircraft inventory, instead of purchasing eight EMB-314s.

On 17 October 2014, the Ministry of Foreign Affairs and International Cooperation announced the go-ahead for acquiring two new A-29s by the FAH following approval from the country's National Council for Security and Defence. As part of the deal, six of the FAH's surviving EMB-312A Tucanos, acquired in 1984, will be refurbished and upgraded by Embraer. Originally operated only by the Academia Militar de Aviación at Palmerola for training, they have recently been armed for counter-narcotics missions. Just three were airworthy as the Brazilian deal was signed for the aircraft to be upgraded and the other three be made airworthy again. Together with the two newly acquired Super Tucanos, this will boost efforts to maintain security within the country.

=== Indonesia ===
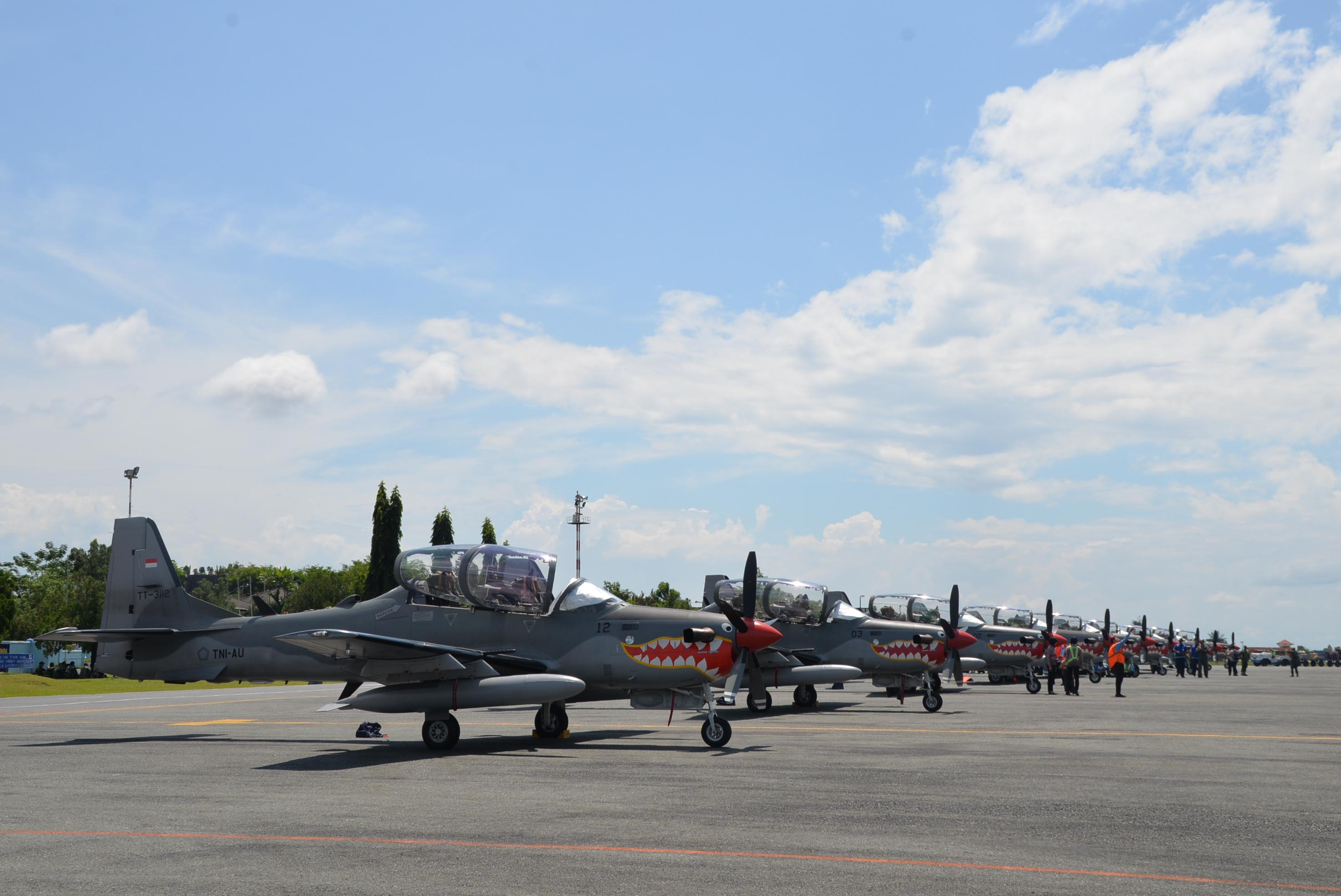
A row of Indonesian Super Tucanos at Syamsudin Noor Airport, 2016

In January 2010, Indonesian Air Force commander Air Marshal Imam Sufaat had designated the Super Tucano as the preferred replacement for OV-10. Indonesia signed a memorandum of understanding with Embraer at the Indo Defense 2010 exhibition in Jakarta. Indonesia initially ordered eight Super Tucanos, including ground-support stations and a logistics package, with an option for another eight on the same terms; the first were scheduled to arrive in 2012. Defense Minister Purnomo Yusgiantoro added that state aircraft maker Indonesian Aerospace would perform maintenance work, and may also manufacture some components. In March 2012, Indonesian Ministry of Defense informed the possibility of a future joint production, further modernization and sales in the Asia-Pacific region.

On 10 July 2012, Indonesia ordered a second set of eight Super Tucanos, along with a full flight simulator, bringing their order total to 16. In August 2012, Indonesia received the first four planes from the initial batch at a ceremony held in its facility in Gavião Peixoto, São Paulo, Brazil. Deliveries of the second batch of Super Tucanos were delayed by over seven months. In September 2014, the second batch left Brazil on their ferry flight to Malang Abdul Rachman Saleh Air Base in East Java. The final four aircraft left Brazil on 15 February 2016, passing through Malta-Luqa International Airport on 21 February and ultimately arriving at Indonesia's Malang Abdul Rachman Saleh Air Force Base on 29 February 2016.

One aircraft was lost in a crash on 10 February 2016, and a further two in crashes on 16 November 2023.

The separatist organization Free Papua Movement claimed that two Indonesian Air Force Super Tucanos had bombed one of their headquarters and an adjacent village in Kiwirok district, Bintang Mountains Regency on 6 October 2025. A video recorded by the rebels showed the aircraft firing its machine guns and unguided rockets. An unnamed official from the Armed Forces headquarters confirmed that there is an operation against the rebels.

In early July 2026, Super Tucano was deployed to provide air cover over Ipdeheik Airstrip in Balinggama village, Yahukimo Regency during an operation to retrieve the body of Nicholas F. Goselin, a US citizen and pilot of Associated Mission Aviation, which was killed by West Papuan rebels.

=== Lebanon ===
The Pentagon first proposed to provide to Lebanon a contract for 10 EMB-314s in 2010. Six Tucanos with 2,000 advanced precision-kill weapon systems went to Lebanon via the US LAS program, but financed by Saudi Arabia at US$462 million. The first two were delivered in October 2017, with four more in June 2018.

=== Mauritania ===
Negotiations for the acquisition of Super Tucanos started in December 2011. On 28 March 2012, at Chile's FIDAE defense and air show, Embraer announced sales of an undisclosed number of aircraft to Mauritania. On 19 October 2012, Embraer delivered the first EMB-314, fitted with a FLIR Safire III infrared turret for border surveillance operations.

=== Nigeria ===
In November 2013, Nigeria showed interest in acquiring twelve new Super Tucanos. Three aircraft were bought from the Brazilian Air Force inventory in 2017. In April 2017, the United States indicated that it would be moving forward with a deal to sell up to 12 of the aircraft for up to US$600 million, ending delays that had been caused by human-rights concerns. In August 2017, the US Department of State approved of the sale of 12 aircraft and associated supplies and weapons.

In November 2018, Nigeria purchased 12 Super Tucanos from Sierra Nevada for $329 million, all of which can be fitted with forward-looking infrared systems. They were delivered to Nigeria in October 2021.

=== Panama ===
In March 2025, it was announced that four Super Tucanos would be purchased for Panama's National Aeronaval Service, which will become the first combat aircraft to ever be operated by the country. It was reported in September 2025 that the contract for four had been signed, making Panama the eighth Latin American Nation to acquire the platform.

=== Philippines ===
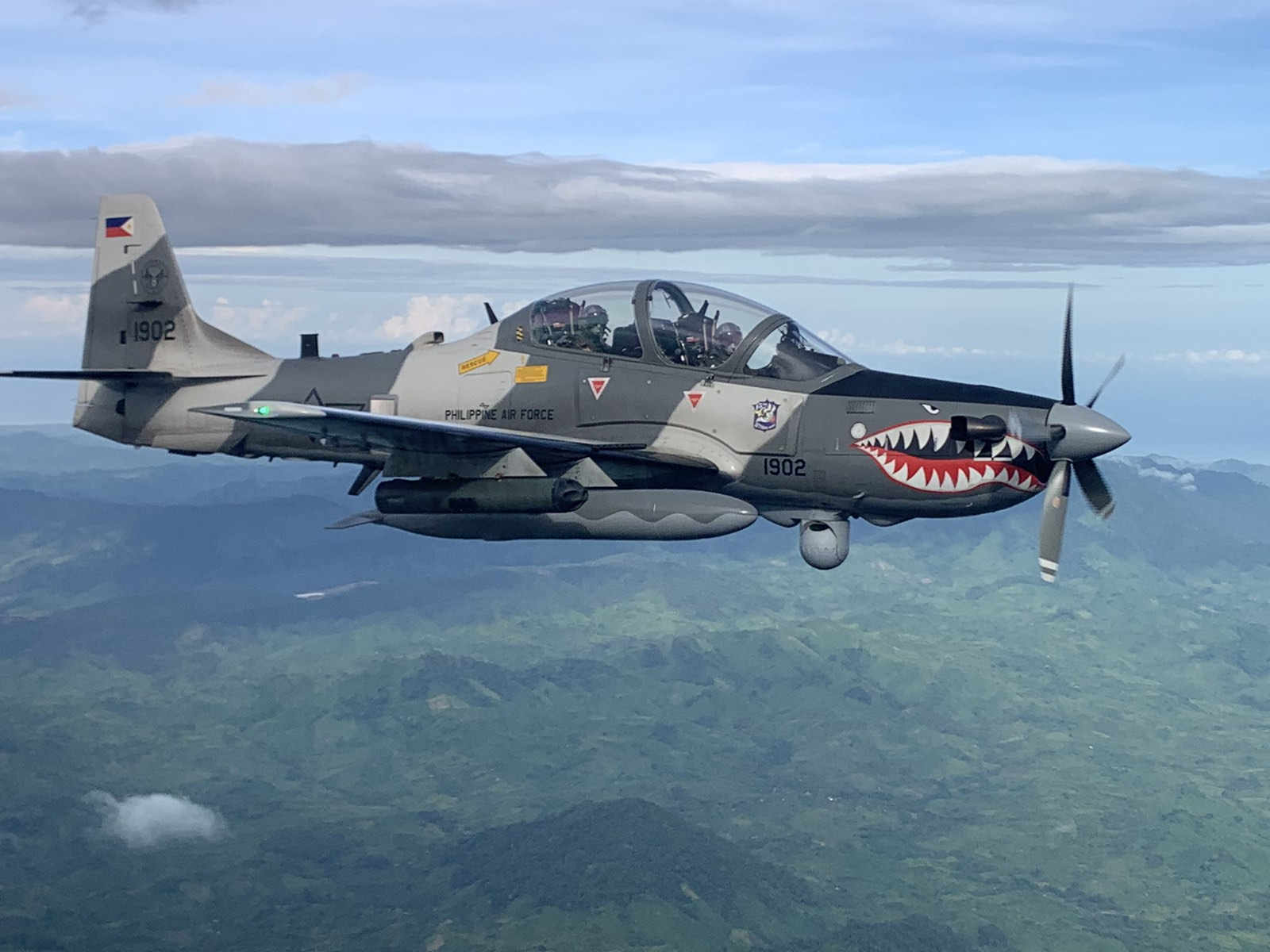
Philippine Air Force A-29B

In 2014, the Philippine Air Force (PAF) initiated a project to acquire six new Close Air Support (CAS) aircraft under its Horizon 1 modernization program. The goal was to replace aging assets and establish a standardized CAS platform for the PAF's 15th Strike Wing, with a target completion date around 2020. These aircraft were intended to support ground and naval forces, conduct airstrikes, and provide surveillance and patrol capabilities. In late 2017, the Department of National Defense signed the contract to purchase 6 units for the Close Air Support Aircraft acquisition project, as included in the AFP Modernization Program's Horizon 1 phase. On 13 October 2020, six A-29Bs were turned over to the PAF. They were inducted with the 16th Attack Squadron, 15th Strike Wing. Defense Secretary Delfin Lorenzana was reportedly considering buying six more A-29Bs.

On 9 December 2021, PAF A-29Bs conducted airstrikes on terrorist encampments as part of Oplan Stinkweed in Palimbang, Sultan Kudarat.

On 31 December 2024, the Philippine Air Force’s 15th Strike Wing held a retirement ceremony for its last two remaining North American Rockwell OV-10 Bronco light attack aircraft and two Bell AH-1 Cobra attack helicopters. Brig. Gen. Juliano Llarenas said during the decommissioning ceremony over the weekend that a contract was signed for 6 additional units of Super Tucano aircraft on 27 December. Embraer confirmed the order for 6 additional aircraft in February 2026.

=== Portugal ===
In 2021, Portugal showed interest in acquiring at least 10 aircraft. In 2022, the Portuguese Air Force reportedly proposed to purchase 12 second-hand A-29s from Brazilian Air Force reserves. In August 2022 the Chief of Staff of the Air Force stated the service's interest in acquiring propeller aircraft for combat missions. By July 2024, it was reported that negotiations were underway for new-build A-29Ns.

In December 2024, it was announced that the Força Aérea Portuguesa would acquire twelve A-29N Super Tucanos.

=== United States ===
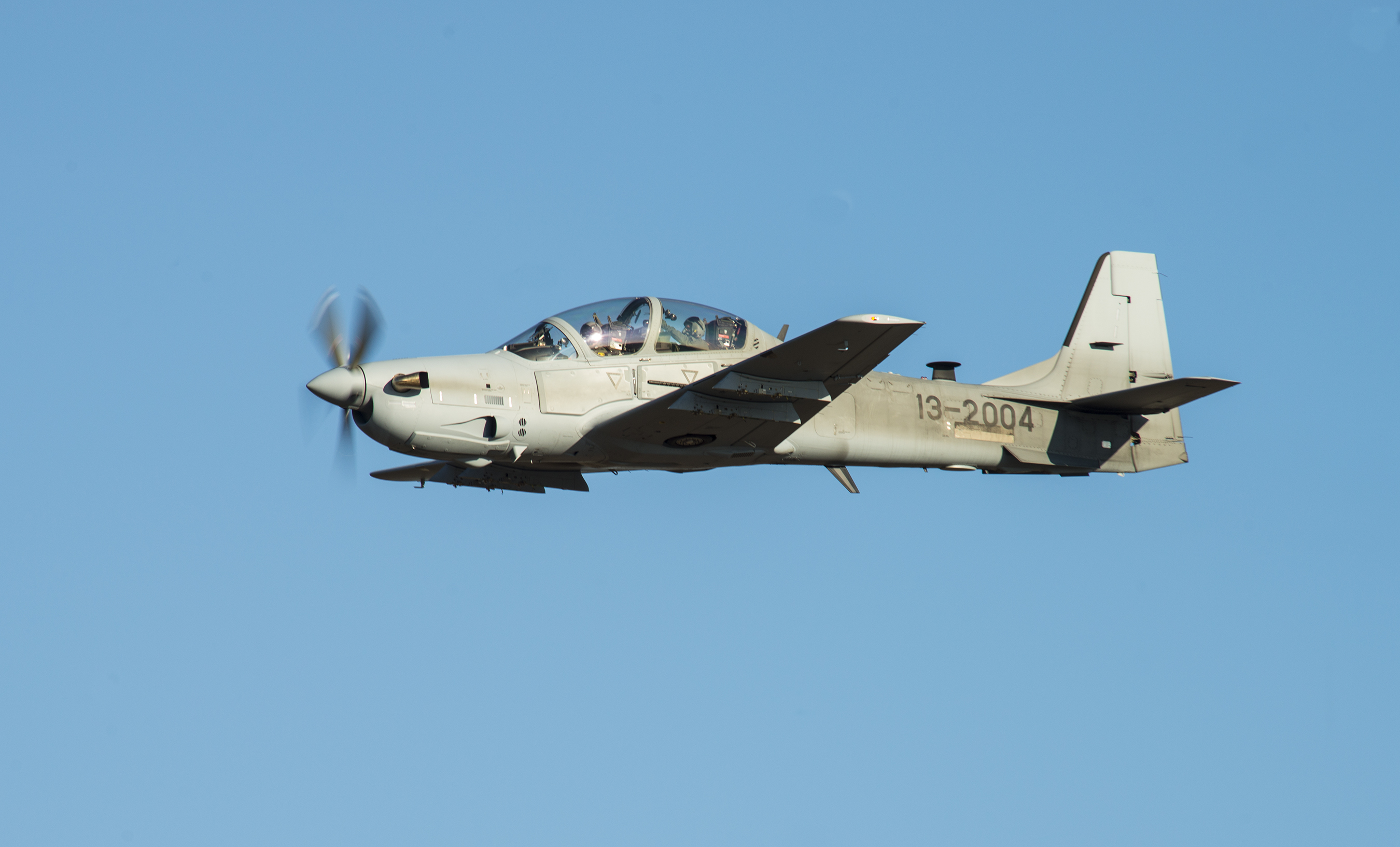
A U.S. Super Tucano flying over Moody Air Force Base in 2015 as part of a training program for Afghan pilots

==== Civilian ====
One Super Tucano was purchased by a subsidiary of Blackwater Worldwide, an American private military contractor. It lacked the normal wing-mounted machine guns. The aircraft was later transferred to Tactical Air Defense Services through a leasing arrangement with Tactical Air Support, Inc., and was based at Tactical Air Support's aviation base in Reno, Nevada, by 2011.

==== Military ====
===== Special operations =====
In 2008, the U.S. Navy began testing the Super Tucano at the behest of the U.S. Special Operations Command for its potential use to support special warfare operations, giving it the official U.S. designation A-29B.

==== Islamic Republic of Afghanistan ====
In 2009, the Super Tucano was offered in a U.S. Air Force competition for 100 counterinsurgency aircraft. On 12 April 2010, Brazil signed an agreement to open negotiations for the acquisition of 200 Super Tucanos by the U.S. On 16 November 2011, the AT-6 was excluded from the LAS program, effectively selecting the Super Tucano. According to GAO: "the Air Force concluded that HBDC had not adequately corrected deficiencies in its proposal… that multiple deficiencies and significant weaknesses found in HBDC's proposal make it technically unacceptable and result in unacceptable mission capability risk". Hawker Beechcraft's protest against its exclusion was dismissed. While the contract award was disputed, a stop-work order was issued in January 2012. For this procurement, the avionics were supplied by Elbit Systems of America. Sierra Nevada, the US-based prime contractor, built the Super Tucano in Jacksonville, Florida. The 81st Fighter Squadron, based at Moody Air Force Base, was reactivated on 15 January 2015 and received the A-29s and provided training to pilots and maintainers from the Afghan Air Force. They were turned over to the Afghans in batches from December 2018.

===== Light attack experiment =====
In August 2017, the US Air Force conducted the "Light Attack Experiment" to evaluate potential light attack aircraft. Following this, it decided to continue experimenting with two non-developmental aircraft, the Textron Aviation AT-6B Wolverine derivative of the T-6 Texan II and the Sierra Nevada/Embraer A-29 Super Tucano. The Air Force initially announced that the next phase would be conducted at Davis-Monthan Air Force Base, Arizona, between May and July 2018, to examine logistics requirements, weapons and sensor issues, and future interoperability with partner forces. Flying for the second phase began in May 2018 at Holloman Air Force Base, New Mexico. On 22 June 2018, an A-29 operating from Holloman crashed over the Red Rio Bombing Range, part of White Sands Missile Range, killing U.S. Navy Lt. Christopher Carey Short and injuring the second crew member. In October 2019, the Air Force issued final requests for proposal for a limited number of AT-6 and A-29 aircraft for continued experimentation, training, and work with partner nations. Three A-29C aircraft later acquired by Air Force Special Operations Command were transferred to the United States Air Force Test Pilot School at Edwards Air Force Base in 2024, where A-29C operations formally began in 2025.

=== Paraguay ===
In July 2024, Embraer and the Paraguayan Air Force announced the acquisition of six Super Tucanos, with deliveries planned to begin in 2025.

=== Uruguay ===
In July 2024, Embraer and the Uruguayan Air Force announced the acquisition of eleven Super Tucanos, with deliveries planned to begin in 2025.

=== Potential operators ===
==== Bolivia ====
Embraer reportedly offered the Super Tucano to the Bolivian Air Force.

==== Equatorial Guinea ====
Equatorial Guinea was said to be interested in purchasing the Super Tucano.

==== Guatemala ====
In August 2011, the Guatemalan Air Force requested credit approval of $166 million to buy six EMB-314s, control centers, radar, and equipment, in the context of a programme named "C4I". In October 2012, the Guatemalan Congress approved a loan for the C4I programme, including the purchase of six A-29s, to be granted by Brazilian and Spanish banks (BNDES and BBVA). The deal was finalized in April 2013. The first two aircraft were expected to arrive in April 2014, followed by two units in 2015 and two more in 2016. However, the president of Guatemala cancelled the order in November 2013. In January 2015, the Guatemalan defence minister disclosed that his country was looking at purchasing two aircraft from Embraer.

==== Libya ====
The Libyan government is interested in buying up to 24 Super Tucanos.

==== Mozambique ====
Brazil planned to donate three EMB-312s for Mozambique Air Force, which may also acquire three Super Tucanos. In 2016, the donation deal was canceled by the Brazilian government.

==== Peru ====
In March 2011, a Brazilian federal representative spoke on the Unasur treaty, stating that it could promote the surveillance integration in the Amazon Basin and facilitate the sale of 12 Super Tucanos and upgrade kits for 20 Peruvian EMB-312s. In November 2011, Peru's defence minister announced the Super Tucano purchase was suspended in favor of the Korean KT-1. On 14 February 2012, Brazil's Ministry of Defence said Peru is considering buying ten Super Tucanos. However, in November 2012, a government-to-government contract was signed for 20 KT-1s. In 2012, the governments of Peru and Brazil restarted negotiations for the acquisition of 12 A-29s to replace A-37 Dragonflys that are due to withdraw in 2017.

==== Suriname ====
Suriname is interested in purchasing between two and four Super Tucanos for light attack roles.

==== Thailand ====
Embraer has also quoted Thailand as a potential customer for the type.

==== UAE ====
In September 2010, it was announced that Brazil and the United Arab Emirates were working a deal that includes sales of Super Tucanos. It was reported in early 2015 that the UAE is negotiating with Embraer the purchase of 24 Super Tucanos, the deal would include six aircraft from Brazilian Air Force inventory for immediate delivery. Since then an Emirati company, Callidus, bought a Brazilian company, Novaer, founded by an engineer involved in the Tucano project, and started a project for an alternative aircraft strongly resembling it, the Calidus B-250.

==== Ukraine ====
In August 2019, a Ukrainian military delegation visited Embraer's military division in São Paulo and flew the Super Tucano. In October 2019, the President of Ukraine, Volodymyr Zelenskyy, in a meeting with Brazilian President Jair Bolsonaro, said that his country would buy the Super Tucano. In December 2022, the Brazilian media reported a Ukrainian interest in the Super Tucano, to equip its air force for the Russo-Ukrainian War; however, the sale was blocked by the Bolsonaro administration. A diplomatic effort by the United States to persuade the president-elect of Brazil, Luiz Inácio Lula da Silva, to unblock the deal, has been reported.

In September 2026, Infodefensa reported that Ukraine was in neogitations to buy 24 A-29N (NATO standard) aircraft via Embraer OGMA in Portugal. These aircraft will perform drone defense missions.

=== Failed bids ===
==== Bolivia ====
After the U.S. ban on Czech aircraft Aero L-159 Alca export on 7 August 2009, the Bolivian Defense Minister said they were considering six aircraft from Brazil or China with comparable role as the L-159. On 9 October 2009, it was announced that China would manufacture six K-8 for Bolivia, to be used for antidrug operations, at a price of $9.7 million per aircraft.

==== El Salvador ====
In November 2010, the President of the Legislative Defense Committee of El Salvador stated they would purchase an estimated 10 EMB-314s. It was postponed in February 2011 by lack of funds. In 2013, the El Salvador Air Force acquired 10 Cessna A-37 retired from Chilean Air Force.

==== Iraq ====
In January 2015 a report in Jane's Defence Weekly said the Iraqi Air Force would receive 24 Super Tucanos, six directly from Brazilian Air Force stocks, and some from an order placed by the United Arab Emirates.

==== Senegal ====
In September 2012, Senegal was reportedly in a procurement process with Embraer. In April 2013, the Brazilian minister of Defence disclosed that Senegal was the 4th African nation to order the Super Tucano, in the following day, Embraer confirmed the order, which included a training system for pilots and mechanics (TOSS) in Senegal, bringing autonomy to that country's Air Force in preparing qualified personnel. However, the deal was not finalized and Senegal opted for four Korean KT-1s.

==== Sweden ====
Sweden proposed replacing its Saab 105 trainer aircraft with Super Tucanos, if Brazil chose to buy the Gripen NG. In May 2021, the Swedish Armed Forces announced that it chose Grob G 120TP as the new trainer and it will enter service in 2023.

==== United Kingdom ====
Elbit Systems and Embraer offered the EMB-314 for the United Kingdom's basic trainer contest. However, the Beechcraft T-6C Texan II formed part of the preferred bid for the requirement in October 2014.

==== Venezuela ====
In February 2006, a 36-unit sale for Venezuela fell through because it was thought the U.S. would block the transfer of U.S.-built components. Venezuelan President Hugo Chávez claimed the U.S. had pressured Brazil not to sign the contract.

== Operators ==
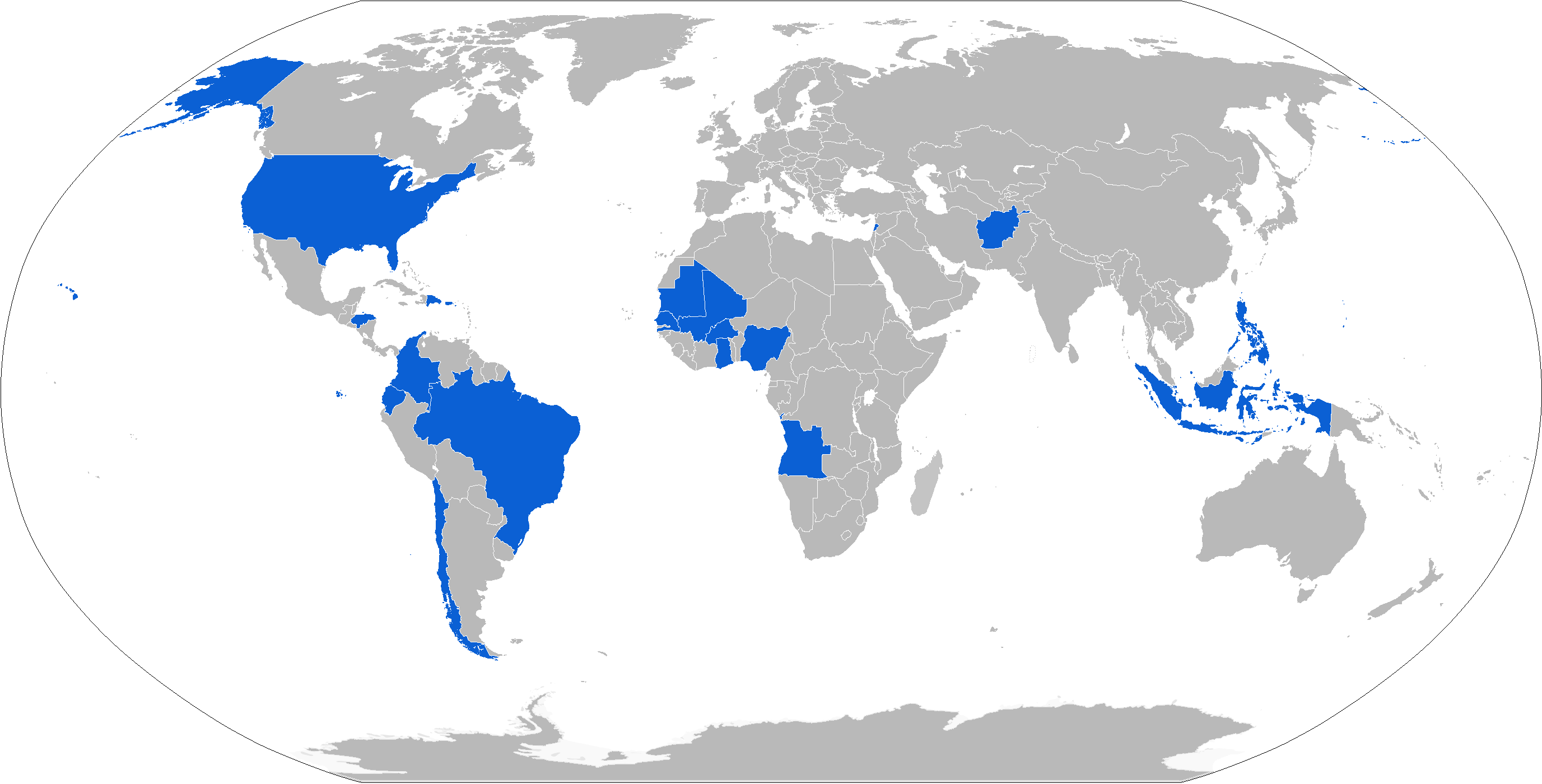
A map of Embraer A-29 Super Tucano operators

Afghanistan

- Afghan Air Force – 26 A-29s ordered, deliveries took place from 2016 to late 2020. They were built by Sierra Nevada Corporation and Embraer in Jacksonville, Florida, and supplied to Afghanistan via the U.S. Air Force's Light Air Support (LAS) program. The first was delivered to the U.S. service in September 2014. The first four A-29s arrived at Hamid Karzai International Airport in Kabul on 15 January 2016. After the fall of Kabul to the Taliban, it is unclear if A-29s will continue to be operated by Afghans.

Angola

- National Air Force of Angola – six aircraft ordered. Deliveries were scheduled to begin in early 2012. The first three were delivered in January 2013.
  - 8th Training Squadron, 24th Training Regiment at Menongue Airport

Brazil

- Brazilian Air Force – 99 aircraft (33 A-29A & 66 A-29B). At least four aircraft have been lost.
  - 1st Squadron of the 3rd Aviation Group (1º/3º GAv) "Esquadrão Escorpião" (Scorpion Squadron)
  - 2nd Squadron of the 3rd Aviation Group (2º/3º GAv) "Esquadrão Grifo" (Griffon Squadron)
  - 3rd Squadron of the 3rd Aviation Group (3º/3º GAv) "Esquadrão Flecha" (Arrow Squadron)
  - 2nd Squadron of the 5th Aviation Group (2º/5º GAv) "Esquadrão Joker" (Joker Squadron)
  - The Aerial Demonstration Squadron "Esquadrilha da Fumaça" Smoke Squadron (EDA)

Burkina Faso

- Burkina Faso Air Force – 3 aircraft delivered in September 2011 of version A-29B.
  - Combat Squadron (Escadrille de Chasse) located at Ouagadougou Air Base

Chile

- Chilean Air Force 22 aircraft. 12 received in 2009, 6 in 2018 and 4 in 2020.
  - Grupo de Aviacion N°1 located at Base aérea "Los Cóndores" in Iquique

Colombia

- Colombian Aerospace Force – 25 aircraft, introduced between 2006 and 2008. At least one aircraft crashed, claimed shot down by FARC.
  - 211 Combat Squadron "Grifos" of the Twenty-first Combat Group at the Captain Luis F. Gómez Niño Air Base
  - 312 Combat Squadron "Drakos" of the Thirty-first Combat Group at the Major General Alberto Pauwels Rodríguez Air Base at Malambo, near Barranquilla
  - 611 Combat Squadron of the Sixty-first Combat Group at the Captain Ernesto Esguerra Cubides Air Base

Dominican Republic

- Dominican Air Force – 8 aircraft
  - Escuadrón de Combate "Dragones", operating from San Isidro Air Base

Ecuador

- Ecuadorian Air Force – 18 aircraft, all delivered by 2011. Ala de Combate No.23, "Luchando Vencerás", Base Aérea Eloy Alfaro, Manta
  - Escuadrón de Combate 2313 "Halcones"
  - Escuadrón de Combate 2311 "Dragones"

Ghana

- Ghana Air Force – 5 aircraft ordered in 2015. The total value of the contract was $88million with a loan from BNDES, which includes logistics support and training for pilots and mechanics in Ghana. The first aircraft were expected to arrive in late 2016, and will be used as advanced training, border surveillance and internal security missions. Ghana's Air Force plans to acquire four more A-29s with light attack, reconnaissance and training capabilities; if finalized, the deal will increase Ghana's A-29 fleet to nine. Until 2024, no deliveries have been made. Embraer and the Sierra Nevada Corporation demonstrated their A-29 Super Tucano close air support, reconnaissance and trainer aircraft to the Ghana Air Force in February 2024, at the Accra Air Force Base. This was done with their demonstrator aircraft PT-ZTU.

Honduras

- Honduran Air Force – 2 aircraft ordered in 2014.

Indonesia

- Indonesian Air Force – 13 in service. 16 aircraft delivered in 2012–2016. Three were lost by 2023.
  - 21st Air Squadron at the Abdul Rachman Saleh Air Force Base

Lebanon

- Lebanese Air Force – 6 A-29s ordered, all six delivered by May 2018.

Mali

- Mali Air Force – 4 A-29 delivered in July 2018. Six originally ordered but due to financial issues the order was reduced to four aircraft.

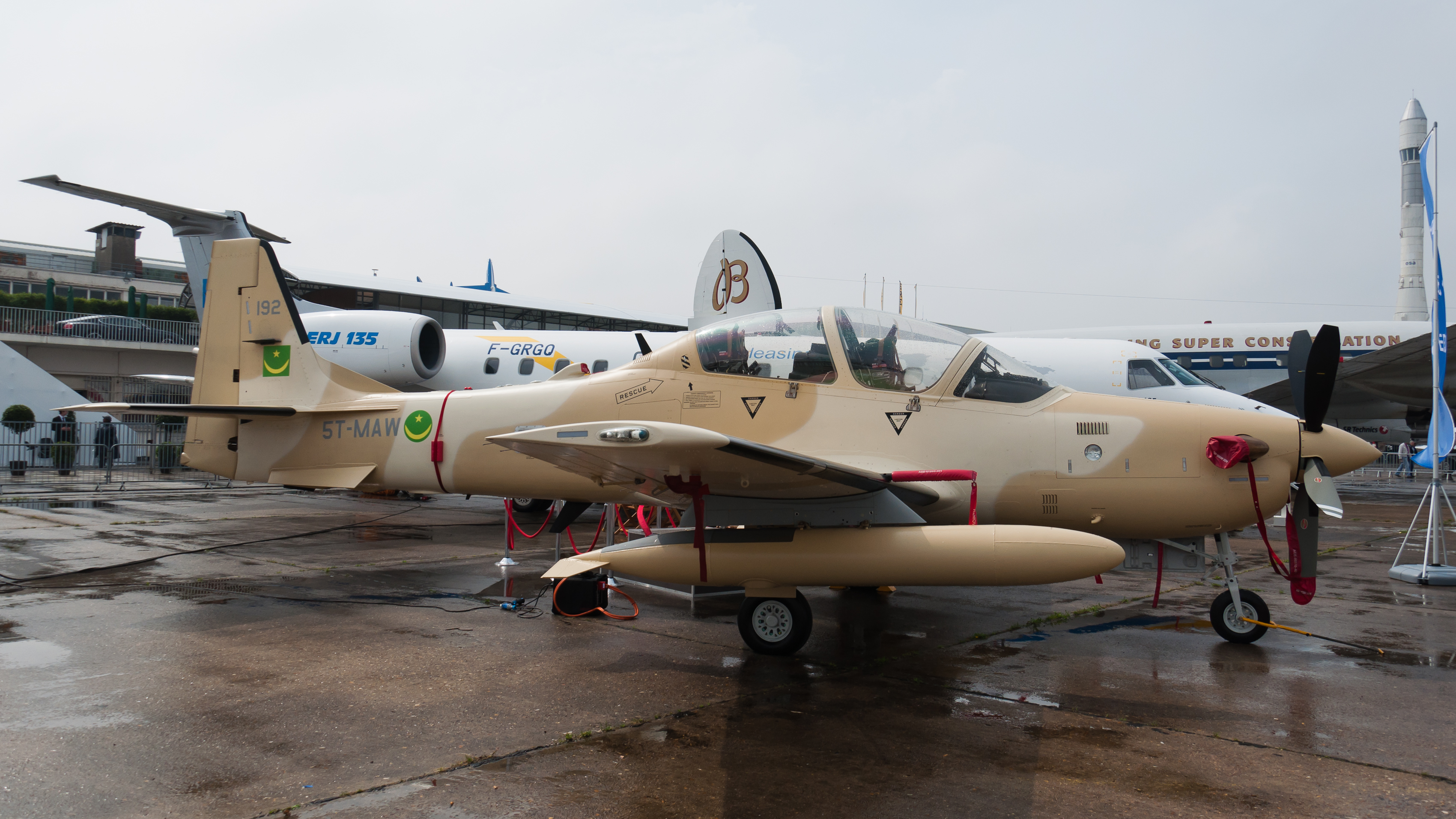
A Mauritania Air Force A-29B Super Tucano at the 2013 Paris Air Show

Mauritania

- Mauritanian Air Force – 4 aircraft ordered, received two aircraft as of December 2012, two more aircraft on order.

Nigeria

- Nigerian Air Force – First batch of 6 aircraft delivered in July 2021. The final batch of 6 aircraft arrived in October 2021, bringing the total number to 12.

Panama

Embraer announced in April 2025 that Panama has chosen the Super Tucano for the surveillance of their air space.

Paraguay

- Paraguayan Air Force – 6 aircraft ordered in July 2024, with deliveries planned to begin in 2025.

Philippines

- Philippine Air Force – 6 aircraft delivered in October 2020. Another 6 on order.
  - 16th Attack Squadron "Eagles"

Portugal

- Portuguese Air Force – In December 2024 Portugal approved the acquisition of 12 A-29N Super Tucano aircraft in a 200-million-euro deal. These Super Tucano variants are configured according to NATO standards, with its avionics to include single-pilot operation and modern data link functions. This version is designed for Close Air Support (CAS), ISR, and advanced training. Acquisition addresses gaps left by the retired Portuguese Alpha Jets.

Turkmenistan

- Turkmen Air Force – Total order quantity not disclosed. 5 aircraft delivered in 2020–2021.

United States

- EP Aviation – part of Academi (formerly Blackwater) – at least one twin-seater variant for pilot training delivered in February 2008. Possible further orders for counter-insurgency role. Later sold in 2010 to Tactical Air Support in Reno, NV.
- United States Navy leased an aircraft for testing, as part of the Imminent Fury program.
- United States Air Force - from 3 to 6 aircraft operated by United States Air Force Special Operations Command. Operated by Air Force Special Operations Command. Delivered in 2021. Transferred to the U.S. Air Force Test Pilot School in 2024.

Uruguay

- Uruguayan Air Force – 6 aircraft ordered in July 2024, with the first two delivered in 2026.

== Accidents ==
- On 10 February 2016, an Indonesian Air Force Embraer EMB-314 Super Tucano crashed in Malang, East Java, on suburb area near Abdul Rachman Saleh Air Base. The aircraft (TT-3108) was on a routine test flight. Both pilots and two civilians died in the accident.
- On 15 August 2021, an Embraer 314 aircraft belonging to the Afghan Armed Forces crashed in the Sherabad district of the Surkhandarya region of the Republic of Uzbekistan.
- On 13 September 2021, a Brazilian Air Force belonging to 3rd Squadron of the 3rd Aviation Group (3°/3°GAv) Flecha crashed near Campo Grande Air Force Base due to "technical failure" during a training flight. The pilot directed the aircraft to an uninhabited area and then ejected. The aircraft was lost and the pilot survived after ejection.
- On 27 Abril 2022, one Brazilian Air Force Embraer EMB-314 Super Tucano belonging to Esquadrão de Demonstração Aérea (Smoke Squadron) crashed in the area of Brazilian Air Force Academy, resulting in an aircraft loss. A pilot and a mechanic ejected successfully.
- On 16 November 2023, two Indonesian Air Force Embraer EMB-314 Super Tucano crashed on the slopes of Mount Bromo, near Keduwung Village, Puspo District, Pasuruan, East Java. The aircraft (TT-3103 and TT-3111) were part of four-aircraft formation with another two Super Tucanos, and on training flight under cloudy weather condition. The four aircraft were flying in a box formation when they suddenly encountered heavy clouds, obstructing visibility. TT-3103 and TT-3111 allegedly collided with mountain slope when the four aircraft broke the formation and attempted to get out of the clouds. Another two Super Tucanos landed safely on Abdul Rachman Saleh Air Base. All four pilots of both planes died in the accident.
- On 30 July 2025, two Brazilian Air Force Embraer EMB-314 Super Tucano belonging to Esquadrão de Demonstração Aérea (Smoke Squadron) supposedly collided during a formation training flight, resulting in one aircraft loss. Footage of the crash site shows debris in an uninhabited area. The pilot successfully ejected.

== Aircraft on display ==
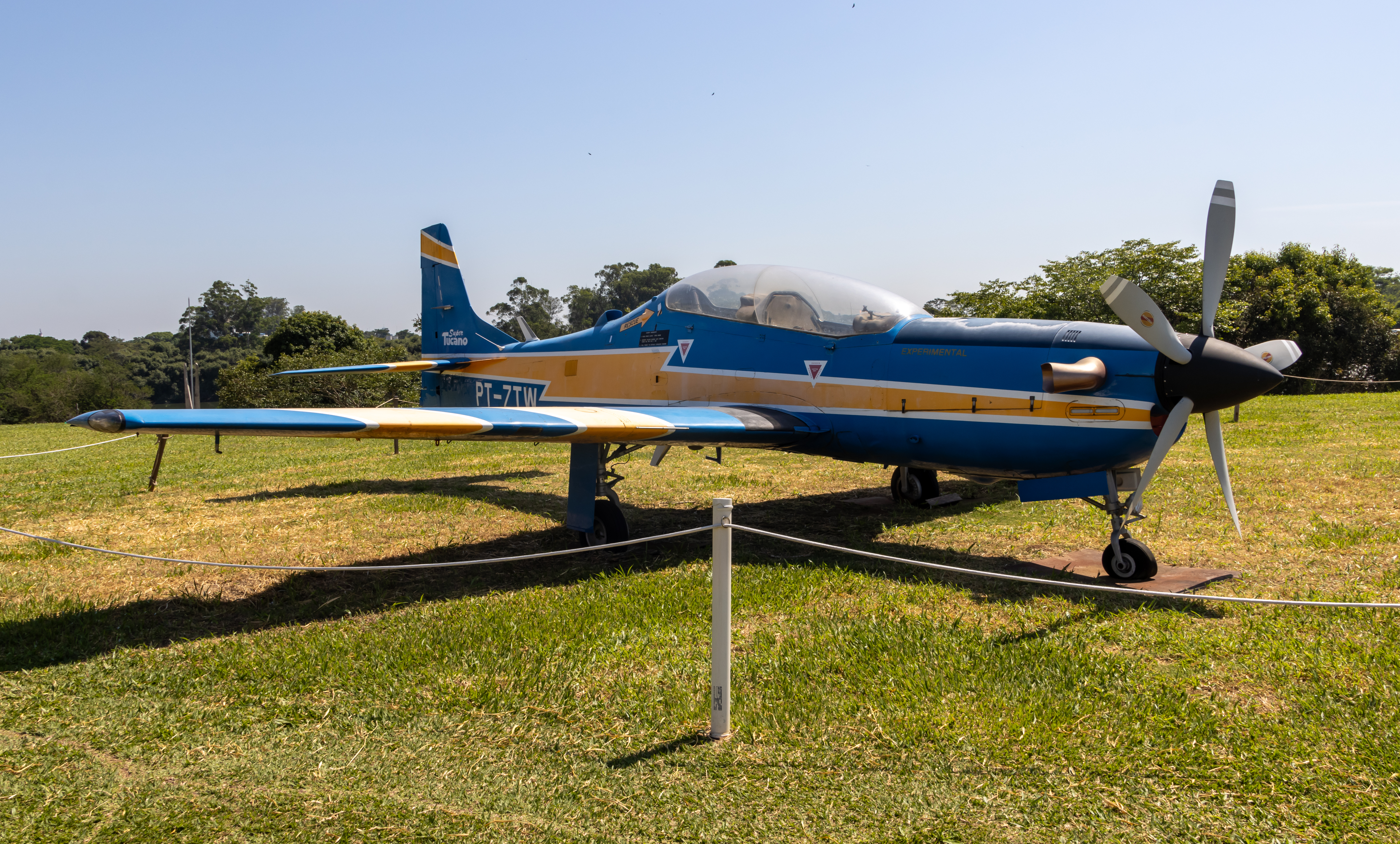
An EMB-312H 1991 prototype on display at Memorial Aeroespacial Brasileiro

EMB 314B Super Tucano

- FAB-5900 – Brazilian Air Force – Memorial Aeroespacial Brasileiro, São José dos Campos

== Specifications (EMB 314 Super Tucano) ==
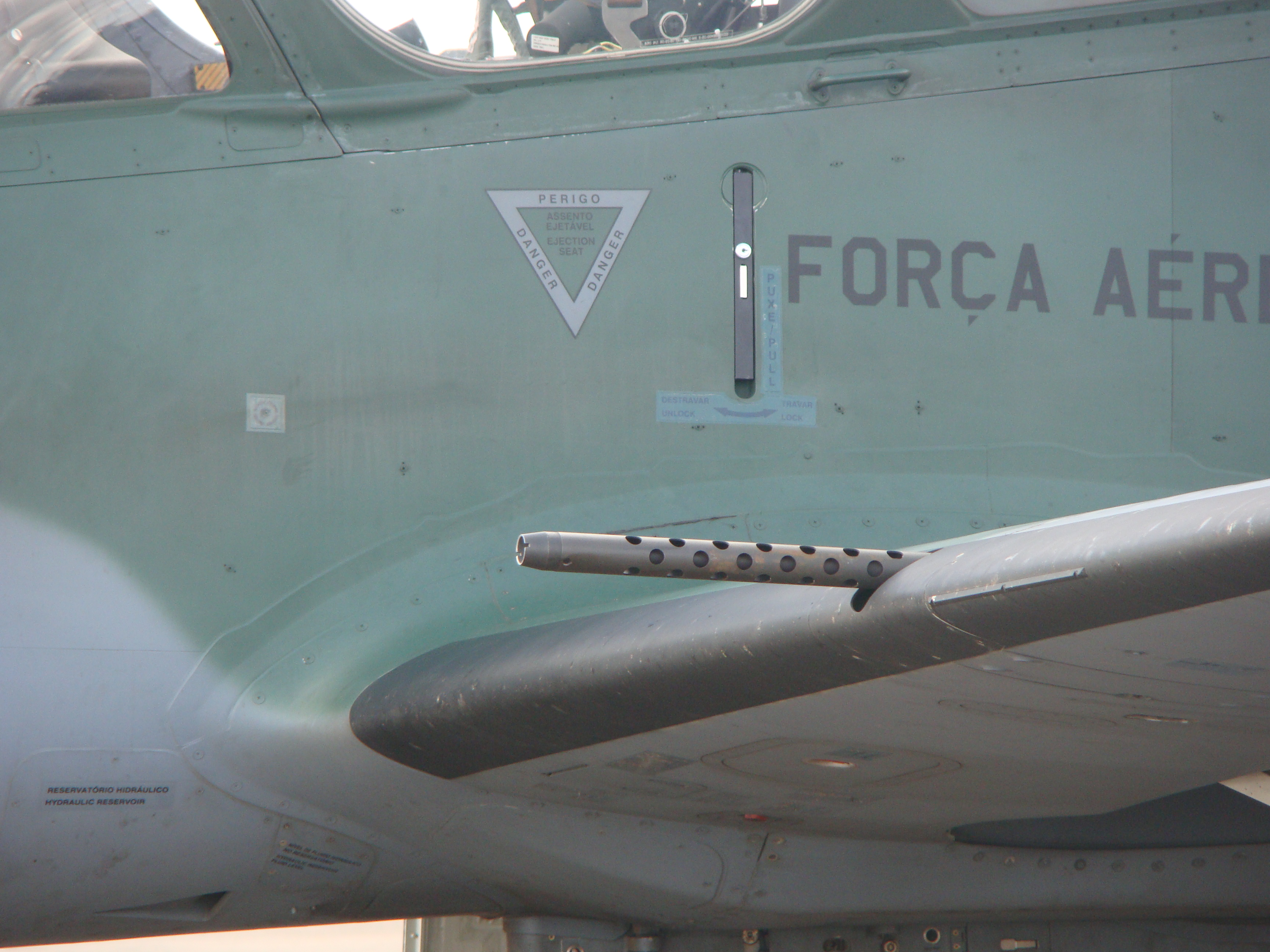
Each wing can be loaded with 200 rounds for the FN Herstal M3P 12.7 mm (.50 in) machine gun, which has a firing rate of up to 1,100 rounds per minute.

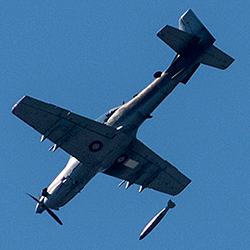
Pilots from the US 81st Fighter Squadron drop a 500-pound inert training bomb from an A-29 Super Tucano on the range near Moody Air Force Base, Georgia.

Data from Type Analysis: Embraer Super Tucano (All specifications from Janes 2010–2011 unless otherwise indicated)

General characteristics

- Crew: 2 (Pilot plus one navigator/student in tandem on Martin Baker Mk 10 LCX zero-zero ejection seats)
- Length: 11.38 m (37 ft 4 in)
- Wingspan: 11.14 m (36 ft 7 in)
- Height: 3.97 m (13 ft 0 in)
- Wing area: 19.4 m^{2} (209 sq ft)
- Airfoil: root: NACA 63A415; tip: NACA 63A212
- Empty weight: 3,200 kg (7,055 lb)
- Max takeoff weight: 5,400 kg (11,905 lb)
- Powerplant: 1 × Pratt & Whitney Canada PT6A-68C turboprop engine, 1,196 kW (1,604 hp)
- Propellers: 5-bladed Hartzell, 2.39 m (7 ft 10 in) diameter constant-speed, fully feathering, reversible-pitch propeller

Performance

- Maximum speed: 590 km/h (370 mph, 320 kn)
- Cruise speed: 520 km/h (320 mph, 280 kn)
- Stall speed: 148 km/h (92 mph, 80 kn)
- Range: 1,330 km (830 mi, 720 nmi)
- Combat range: 550 km (340 mi, 300 nmi) (hi-lo-hi profile, 1,500 kg (3,307 lb) of external stores)
- Ferry range: 2,855 km (1,774 mi, 1,542 nmi)
- Endurance: 8 hours 24 minutes
- Service ceiling: 10,668 m (35,000 ft)
- g limits: +7 /−3.5
- Rate of climb: 16.4 m/s (3,230 ft/min)

Armament

- Guns:
  - Internal: Two 12.7 mm (0.50 in) FN Herstal or U.S. Ordnance M3P machine guns as designated "M3W", one fixed mounted in each wing with 200 rounds per M3, 1,100 rounds per minute.
  - pod: One 20 mm (0.79 in) M20A1 cannon below the fuselage, 650 rounds per minute.
  - pod: One 12.7 mm (0.50 in) FN Herstal HMP for M3P machine guns under each wing
  - pod: up to four 7.62 mm (0.30 in) Dillon Aero M134 Minigun (under development) under wings, 3,000 rounds per minute.
- Hardpoints: 5 (two under each wing and one under fuselage centreline) with a capacity of 1,550 kg (3,300 lb)
- Rockets:
  - Four pods 70 mm (2.75 in) LM-70/19(SBAT-70)
  - Four pods 70 mm (2.75 in) LAU-68A/G
  - Four pods for the 70 mm (2.75 in) APKWS
- Missiles:
  - Air-to-air:
    - AIM-9L Sidewinder
    - MAA-1A Piranha
    - MAA-1B Piranha (under development)
    - Python 3
    - Python 4
  - Air-to-ground:
    - AGM-65 Maverick
    - Roketsan Cirit
  - General-purpose bombs:
    - Ten Mk 81
    - Five Mk 82
    - M117
  - Incendiary bombs:
    - BINC-300
  - Cluster bombs:
    - BLG-252
  - Precision-guided bombs:
    - FPG-82 (under development) Friuli Aeroespacial INS/GPS guidance kit for Mk 82.
    - SMKB-82 – INS/GPS guidance kit for Mk 82.
    - GBU-54 (under development)
    - GBU-38 (under development)
    - GBU-39 (under development)
    - Paveway II
    - Lizard – Elbit laser guidance kit.
    - Griffin – IAI laser guidance kit.
- Others:
  - Chaff & flare (countermeasure)
  - FLIR AN/AAQ-22 Star Safire II (Electro-optical/infrared sensors)
  - Drop tanks

Avionics

- MIL-STD-1553 standards.
- NVG ANVIS-9 (Night Vision)
- CCIP / CCRP / CCIL / DTOS / LCOS / SSLC (Computerized Attack Modes)
- Rohde & Schwarz M3AR VHF/UHF Airborne Transceiver (two-way encrypted Data Link provision)
- HUD / HOTAS
- HMD with UFCP (Up Front Control Panel)
- Laser INS with GPS Navigational System.
- CMFD (Colored Multi-Function Display) liquid crystal active matrix
- Integrated Radio Communication and Navigation
- Video Camera/Recorder
- Automatic Pilot with embedded mission planning capability
- Stormscope WX-1000E (Airborne weather mapping system)
- Laser Range Finder
- WiPak Support (Wi-Fi integration for Paveway bombs).
- Training and Operation Support System (TOSS).

== See also ==
Related development

- Embraer EMB 312 Tucano
- Short Tucano

Aircraft of comparable role, configuration, and era

- Calidus B-250
- KAI KT-1 Woongbi
- L3Harris OA-1K Skyraider II
- Pilatus PC-21
- Piper PA-48 Enforcer
- PZL-130 Orlik
- TAI Hürkuş
- US Aircraft A-67 Dragon
- UTVA Kobac

Related lists

- Counter-insurgency aircraft
- List of active Brazilian military aircraft
