= Fortune favours the bold =

Translation of a Latin proverb

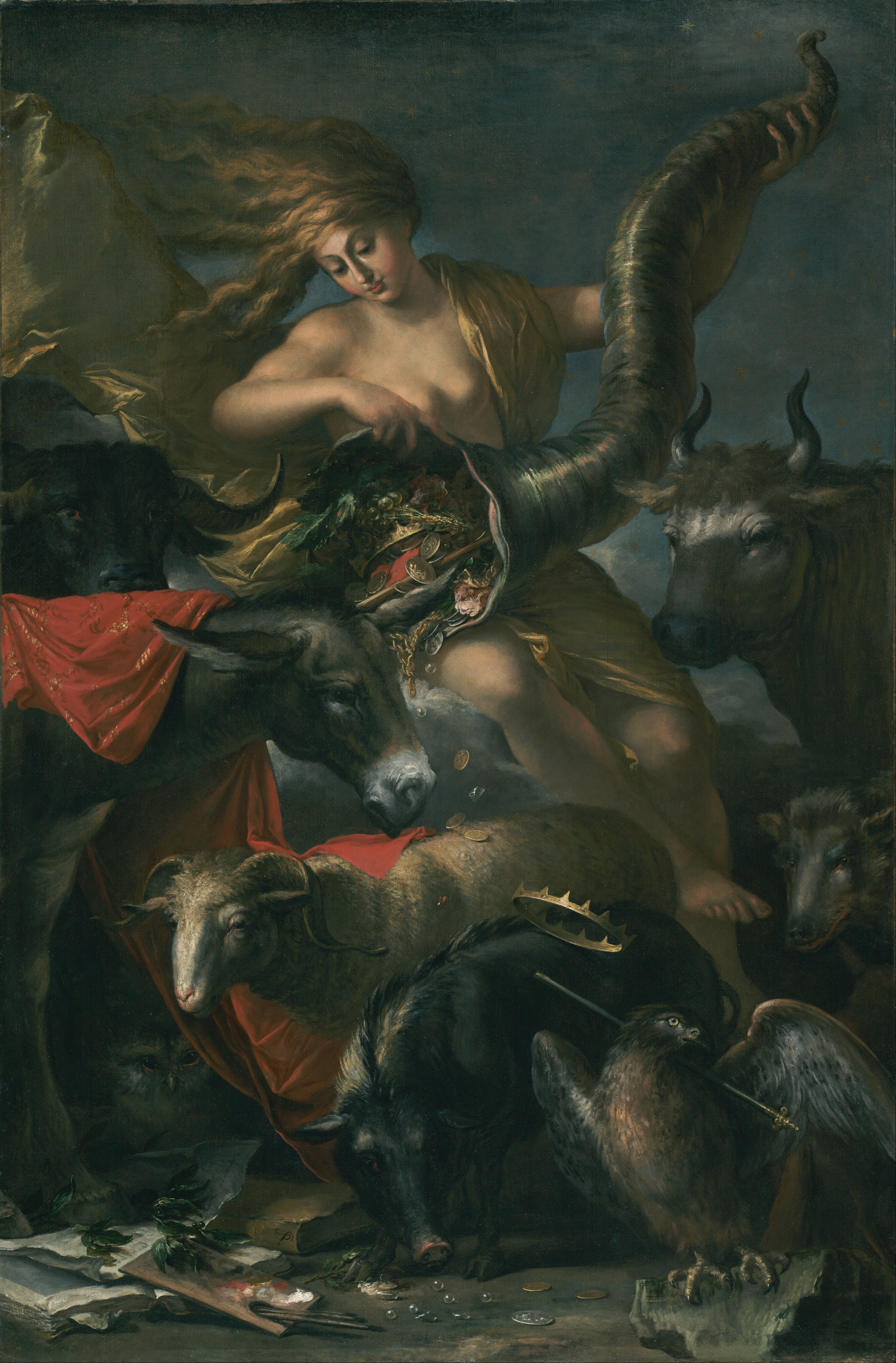
Allegory of Fortune, Salvator Rosa, 1685

"Fortune favours the bold", or "Fortune favours the brave", is among the English translations of the Latin proverb "audentes Fortuna iuvat", or "fortes Fortuna iuvat", and its variations. The phrase has been widely used as a slogan in the Western world to emphasize the rewards of courage and bravery, particularly within military organizations, and it is also used up to the present day on the coats of arms of numerous families and clans. It has historically served as a popular motto for universities, along with other academic institutions and recreational associations.

== Background ==
Fortune favours the bold is the translation of a Latin proverb, which exists in several forms with slightly different wording but effectively identical meaning, such as:

- audentes Fortuna iuvat
- audentes Fortuna adiuvat
- Fortuna audaces iuvat
- audentis Fortuna iuvat

This last form is used by Turnus, an antagonist in the Aeneid by Virgil. Fortuna refers to luck and to the Roman goddess who was its personification.

Another version of the proverb, fortes Fortuna adiuvat, 'fortune favours the strong/brave', was used in Terence's 151 BCE comedy play Phormio, line 203. Ovid extends the phrase at I.608 of his didactic work, Ars Amatoria, writing "audentem Forsque Venusque iuvat" or "Venus, like Fortune, favors the bold."

Pliny the Younger quotes his uncle, Pliny the Elder, as using the phrase Fortes fortuna iuvat when deciding to take his fleet and investigate the eruption of Mount Vesuvius in CE 79, in the hope of helping his friend Pomponianus: "'Fortes' inquit 'fortuna iuvat: Pomponianum pete.'" ("'Fortune', he said, 'favours the brave: head for Pomponianus.'") Pliny the Elder ultimately died during the expedition.

The Latin phrase Fortuna Eruditis Favet ("fortune favours the prepared mind") is also used. Louis Pasteur, the French microbiologist and chemist, expressed this as: "Dans les champs de l'observation le hasard ne favorise que les esprits préparés", meaning "In the fields of observation, chance favours only the prepared minds."

In The Prince, Niccolò Machiavelli remarked, "It is better to be adventurous than cautious," but extending the metaphor, "because fortune is a woman and . . . it is necessary to beat and ill-use her; and it is seen that she allows herself to be mastered by the adventurous."

The proverb may be a rewording of a line by Democritus that "boldness is the beginning of action, but fortune controls how it ends" (Ancient Greek: Τόλμα πρήξιος αρχή, τύχη δε τέλεος κυρίη, romanized: Tólma préxios arché, túche de téleos kuríe).

== Examples ==
=== Australia ===
'Virtutis Fortuna Comes' (Fortune is the companion of virtue) is the unit motto of the 12th/16th Hunter River Lancers; an Army Reserve unit based in Northern New South Wales (the Hunter River region, hence the name) and South East Queensland.

=== Brazil ===
The motto for the GRUMEC (Brazilian Navy's special group) and COMANDOS ANFÍBIOS (Brazilian Marines special operations group) is "Fortuna Audaces Sequitur" (Fortune follows the brave – A sorte acompanha os audazes).

=== Denmark ===
The quote "Fortes Fortuna Juvat" is used by the Jydske Dragonregiment, or Jutish Dragoon Regiment, in the Royal Danish Army.

=== Germany ===
The Latin version of the quote "Fortes fortuna adiuvat" is used as the motto of the 2nd Company of the 471st Logistics Battalion (Logistikbataillon 471, 2. Kompanie) of the Bundeswehr.

=== Ireland ===
The O'Flaherty clan has historically used the phrase "Fortuna Favet Fortibus" as a motto.

The O'Keeffe family motto is “Forti et fideli nihil difficile” which translates as “For the brave and faithful, nothing is difficult”.

One of the McCarthy family mottos is "Forti et fideli nihil difficile".

The Duke of Wellington, Arthur Wellesley, Earl of Mornington, used the motto "Virtutis Fortuna Comes".

=== Italy ===
The quote "Audentes fortuna iuvat" appears in the University of Milano-Bicocca logo.

=== Malaysia ===
"Fortuna Eruditis Favet" is the motto of Sunway University and Sunway College.

=== Netherlands ===
The motto is used by the Cornielje family of The Netherlands alongside their coat of arms.

=== New Zealand ===
The Wellington Regiment (City of Wellington's Own) adopted the badge of the Duke of Wellington's Regiment of the British Army, along with the motto of the Duke of Wellington "Virtutis Fortuna Comes" (see United Kingdom below). The Regiment's traditions are now carried on by Wellington Company, 5th / 7th Battalion Royal New Zealand Infantry Regiment. Also the motto of the New Zealand Cadet Forces.

=== Pakistan ===
The motto for a tank regiment, 33rd Cavalry of Pakistan Armoured Corps.

=== Poland ===
The motto is used by the 6th Airborne Brigade (Poland).

=== Portugal ===
The motto for the Portuguese commandos is "Audaces Fortuna Juvat" (A sorte protege os Audazes).

=== Romania ===
"Audaces fortuna juvat" is the motto of the Naval Special Operations Forces, known as FNOS or GNFOS.

=== Sri Lanka ===
The motto is used by the Special Boat Squadron (Sri Lanka).

=== United Kingdom ===
Because it was the motto of the Duke of Wellington, Earl of Mornington, Virtutis Fortuna Comes is used as the motto for the British Army's Yorkshire Regiment, having been previously used by one of the Yorkshire's antecedent regiments, the Duke of Wellington's Regiment (West Riding [33rd/76th Foot]). It is also the motto for Wellington College, Berkshire.

A number of armigerous families use this motto, often featured on their coats of arms; these families include Clan MacKinnon, Clan Turnbull, and several Dickson families, including a number resident in Forfarshire, and the Dickson Barons Islington.

The phrase was used as the motto of the Royal Air Force station based at East Fortune, in East Lothian. The base was operational in the First World War and between 1940 and 1947.

It is the motto of the football club Linfield F.C. in Belfast.

"Audentis Fortuna Juvat" is the motto of the Outwood Cricket Club in Outwood, Wakefield, West Yorkshire.

It is also the motto of Liverpool John Moores University.

The Latin equivalent "Fortuna audentes juvat" is used as the motto for the Turing family, dating back to 1316 AD.

=== United States ===
Motto used by the 80th Fighter Squadron stationed at Kunsan AB, Republic of South Korea.

As "Fortes Fortuna Juvat",

- it appears on the crest of the 3rd Marine Regiment at Kaneohe Bay, Hawaii.
- it is on the seal of the Special Missions Training Center
- it is the official motto of the United States Coast Guard Academy Class of 1982.

"Fortuna Favet Fortibus" ("Fortune favours the brave")

- is the official motto of the United States Naval Academy Classes of 1985, 2004, and 2012.
- Is on the emblem of the 3rd Battalion 8th Marines 2n Marine Division .

"Audaces Fortuna Juvat"

- is the official motto of the United States Naval Academy Class of 1992.

"Fortes Fortuna Juvat"

- is the unit motto for 2nd Battalion, 3rd Marines, stationed out of Marine Corps Base Hawaii.
- appears on the gates of Honor Hill at Ft. Benning, Georgia.
- has been the motto of several United States Navy ships:
  - USNS Carl Brashear (T-AKE-7). The motto appears on the ship's insignia.
  - USS La Jolla (SSN-701)
  - USS Florida (SSGN-728), after her conversion from an SSBN to a SSGN.
  - USS Montpelier (SSN-765)
  - USS John S. McCain (DDG-56)

"Audentes Fortuna Juvat"

- is used by the 366th Fighter Wing of the United States Air Force and appears on the wing patch. The motto is also used by the Air Force Office of Special Investigations, 3rd Field Investigation Region, Detachment 327, Little Rock Air Force Base.
- is the motto of the 80th Fighter Squadron (The Headhunters) stationed out of Kunsan Air Base, Republic of Korea.
- is the unit motto for 3rd Battalion, 8th Marines, stationed out of Marine Corps Base Camp Lejeune, North Carolina.
- is also used on the Seattle Police Department's SWAT unit patch.
- is the squadron motto for US Navy Growler Squadron VAQ-209, stationed at Naval Air Station Whidbey Island, Washington.
- is the unit motto of the 16th Attack Squadron, 15th Strike Wing, Philippine Air Force.

"Fortuna favet audaci"

- is the motto of Trumbull College of Yale University.

During the American Civil War, the Confederate States of America Army's 7th Alabama Cavalry displayed "Fortuna Favet Fortibus" on its flag.

== In popular culture ==
- In the 1986 film Star Trek IV: The Voyage Home, Admiral James T. Kirk alters the phrase when setting off on a dangerous mission, saying sardonically, "May fortune favor the foolish."
- In the 1997 episode of Star Trek: Deep Space Nine, "Favor the Bold", Ben Sisko says the phrase as the last line of the episode. He refers to it as an old saying.
- A 1998 Flaming Carrot Comics collection was titled Flaming Carrot Comics: Fortune Favors the Bold!.
- In Elton John and Tim Rice's 2000 musical Aida, "Fortune Favors the Brave" is the second musical number.
- Alexander the Great tells Ptolemy I Soter "FORTUNE FAVORS THE BOLD " in the Oliver Stone 2004 film Alexander (2004 film), an epic about Alexander the Great directed by Oliver Stone.
- Buffy Summers says "Fortune favors the brave" twice in the 1999 episode "Hush" of Buffy the Vampire Slayer.
- In the 2002 film Gangs of New York, midway during the film, on election night, Boss Tweed yells out to the gathered crowd, "Fortuna Juvat Audentes". Leading the chant back was the lead character, Amsterdam Vallon, and they replied in English, "Fortune favors the bold".
- In the films John Wick and John Wick: Chapter 2 (2014, 2017) the title character bears a tattoo across his upper back reading "FORTIS FORTUNA IUVAT" which means "Fortune favors the strong".
- In the 2015 award-winning video game The Witcher 3: Wild Hunt, while exploring the landscape, players can find and read a book entitled 'Unfinished Book'. Within the text of this book, the phrase "audentes fortuna iuvat!" can be found.
- In 2021, Matt Damon appeared in an advertisement for Crypto.com encouraging investors using the proverb ("Fortune favors the brave") as a slogan. The advertisement was widely criticized, and it was frequently satirized by the animated series South Park, beginning in its twenty-fifth season.
- In Episode 12, Season 2 of the anime The Faraway Paladin (2023), the spirits of the dwarven warriors chant this as a rallying war cry against the evil dragon Valacirca in support of William G. Maryblood and his brave party as they prepare to face off once more.
- The original Latin version of the proverb is frequently used in the 2025 video game Kingdom Come: Deliverance II, most prominently by the character of Hans Capon.

== See also ==
- God helps those who help themselves, an originally ancient Greek slogan
- Who Dares Wins, a Latin-derived British military slogan
