= SMKB =

- Type: Fixed target, precision strike
- Place of origin: Brazil

Production history
- Designed: 2009
- Manufacturer: AEQ/Mectron
- Produced: 2012-
- Variants: See variants

Specifications
- Maximum firing range: 16-24km (stand-alone); 35-40km (with FPG-82); 50km (with Booster)
- Flight ceiling: 10 kilometres (33,000 ft)
- Guidance system: Satellite (GPS, GLONASS, Galileo) / INS
- Accuracy: less than 5 meters
- Launch platform: Super Tucano, A-4, AMX, F-5, Su-27, F-16, Kfir

The SMKB (Smart-MK-Bomb) is a guidance kit that turns a standard Mk 82 (500 lbs) and Mk 83 (1.000 lbs) into a Precision-guided weapon, respectively called SMKB-82 and SMKB-83. The kit provides extended range up to 50 kilometres (27 nmi) and are guided by an integrated inertial guidance system coupled to three satellites networks, relying on wireless to handle the flow of data between the aircraft and the munition.

== Development ==
In April 2009, AEQ and Mectron, defense division of Odebrecht Organisation, displayed at LAAD 2009 the first mock-up of a Brazilian precision guided weapons kit. Development of the SMKB was officially started in November 2009, and included a partnership with the Brazilian Air Force, through the "General Command of Aerospatial Technology" (Comando-Geral de Tecnologia Aeroespacial, CTA).

In the early stages of development, it was tested with GPS as the only satellite navigation network, however it is known that the U.S. (and other nations) have methods and devices to interfere with the satellite signal to degrading weapon accuracy. In order to improve the resilience against jamming, it was decided to create a guide system, capable of operating with three satellite navigation networks: GPS (United States), Galileo (European Union) and GLONASS (Russia). The software coupled to the SMKB reads simultaneously and individually the three systems and assesses the positioning based on a verification algorithm, which provides greater reliability, because the data are crossed to allow correct positioning. In addition, the company has developed anti-jamming capability with encrypted software which provides complete system integrity, also enhanced by the use of a highly directive radiation pattern.

External videos
- SMKB-32 Trials, 2010 Youtube

Super Tucano aircraft were used during a 2 weeks long trials at which the first in-flight launch of the weapon took place in December 2010 at Natal Air Force Base. The SMKB-82 was cleared for use with the AMX, F-5, Kfir and Super Tucano by December 2012. Qualification test for SMKB-83 are scheduled to commence in 2013

== Variants ==
- SMKB-82 - Kit for Mk-82
- SMKB-83 - Kit for Mk-83

== See also ==
- FPG-82

Similar Weapons

- Joint Direct Attack Munition
- AASM
- Paveway IV
- HGK
- Spice
- Umbani
- LT PGB
