= GPS aircraft tracking =

GPS aircraft tracking is a means of tracking the position of an aircraft fitted with a satellite navigation device. By communication with navigation satellites, detailed real-time data on flight variables can be passed to a server on the ground. This server stores the flight data, which can then be transmitted via telecommunications networks to organizations wishing to interpret it.

== Networks ==
The different kinds of telecommunication networks used are:

- ACARS - a hybrid of the VHF, satellite and HF network
- The transponder "Mode S" (ADS-B) network
- Satellite networks (Globalstar, Inmarsat, IRIDIUM, Thuraya)
- The GSM network

== Equipment ==
Some devices are avionics components like ACARS and ADS-B. In these cases the receiving and transmitting antenna are usually located outside of the airframe.

When devices are not installed as avionics components they have to be completely independent from the aircraft. They are typically placed inside of the airframe in a location where the GPS and communication satellites are directly visible to the device, for example through the cockpit window. The output signal must also be able to penetrate the aircraft - most civil aviation authorities require compliance with DO-160 for audio frequency conducted susceptibility and induced signal susceptibility.

Authorities classify non-installed components as "transmitting portable electronic devices" (T-PEDS) and as such require them to be switched off during the critical phases of flight.

== Applications ==
Accurate real-time data provided by GPS aircraft tracking may be offered to air traffic control using ADS-B technology. This can safely reduce airspace separation of aircraft. GPS aircraft tracking also enables airlines to track their fleet of aircraft over the ACARS system, and allows aircraft to be more easily located in the event of an accident. The data is processed to gather "OOOI" information about movements within the airport and to compute flight time. Finally, GPS aircraft tracking permits a flight school to track a trainee pilot and debrief his/her flight path afterwards.

== Active aircraft tracking ==
There are several active aircraft tracking systems available on the market that use the "bread-crumb approach" to SAR. Rather than relying on an emergency locator transmitter to transmit upon impact, the next generation of emergency locating devices are active tracking devices that send position reports at regular time intervals. If the unit stops transmitting upon impact, the historical transmissions will give the last known location of the aircraft, its speed, direction and altitude. Tracking as an alternative or complement to current technology has recently been encouraged by the Coroner in New Zealand.

== See also ==
- Index of aviation articles
- Flight tracking
- Emergency position-indicating radiobeacon station
- Spidertracks
