= BINC-300 =

The BINC-300 is a Brazilian incendiary bomb. The bomb utilizes napalm. Its main goal is to be used against flammable targets such as munitions and fuel depots, parking lots, aircraft, and refineries.

The BINC-300 is constructed with steel, and has reinforced areas capable of handling the forces the bomb meets in flight. The tank is hermetically sealed, making the use of incendiary compositions possible.

== Characteristics ==
- Length: 2,960 millimetres (117 in)
- Diameter: 400 millimetres (16 in)
- Weight: 209 kilograms (461 lb)
