= Constantly computed impact point =

Calculation for a weapon sighting system

A constantly computed impact point (CCIP) is a calculation provided by a weapon's sighting system. It is a predicted point of impact found from the launch platform's movement, the target's movement, gravity, projectile launch velocity, projectile drag, and other factors that can be entered. It is usually displayed on the Head Up Display (HUD).

The HUD crosshairs will move around dependent on where the computer predicts the selected rocket, bullet or bomb will hit. Normally a radar lock is necessary, but when strafing or bombing a ground target (A/G mode; A/A mode will simply put the hairs in the centre of the HUD), the crosshairs will move along the ground.

This system is normally used in aircraft, other large vehicles, or large static weapons, but it is in principle possible for such a system to be miniaturized for a man-portable firearm or Unmanned Combat Aerial Vehicle (UCAV).

The continually computed release point (CCRP) inverts the principle of CCIP. A desired impact point is indicated. The HUD puts a vertical line along the bearing to the impact point, and the pilot points the aircraft onto that line and flies a steady course, whether level bombing, dive bombing, or toss bombing (releasing bombs on a lofted climbing trajectory.) The pilot or weapon systems officer authorizes weapon release but for maximum precision the exact timing is determined and executed by the computer.

== See also ==
- List of established military terms
- Index of aviation articles
- TERCOM
