= FPG-82 =

- Concept of the FPG-82
- Type: Bomb
- Place of origin: Brazil

Production history
- Designed: July 2020
- Manufacturer: Friuli Aeroespacial
- Unit cost: US$25,000 (2010)
- Produced: 2013- (scheduled)

Specifications
- Operational range: 75–80 km
- Guidance system: GPS / INS.
- Launch platform: Combat aircraft

The FPG-82 is an INS/GPS guided wing-kit for Mk-82-class bombs, under development by Friuli Aeroespacial, for the Brazilian Air Force.

== Service ==
The FPG-82 will equip the Brazilian Air Force's F-5BR and AMX, and Brazilian Naval Aviation A-4.

== Characteristics ==
The kit adds a 40 kg GPS/INS navigation system in a tail fairing and pop-out wing in a dorsal saddleback fairing enabling a 7:1 glide ratio aiming to increase standoff range up to 80 km.

== See also ==
- Mk-82
- SMKB
- Joint Direct Attack Munition
