= 16th Attack Squadron =

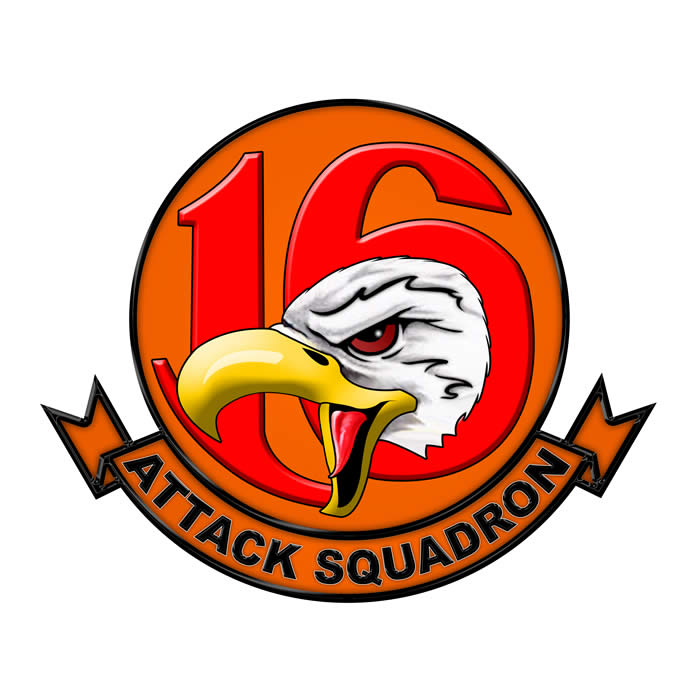
- 16th Attack Squadron Patch
- Active: since 1974
- Country: Philippines
- Branch: Philippine Air Force
- Type: Squadron
- Garrison / HQ: Danilo Atienza Air Base
- Nickname: "The Eagles"
- Anniversaries: August 1, 1974

Aircraft flown
- Attack: Embraer A-29B Super Tucano

The 16th Attack Squadron provides tactical air operations designed to destroy enemy forces and installations. Its specific functions include: providing close air support to ground and naval forces; performing tactical air reconnaissance; provides rocket, bomb, gun attacks on enemy forces and installations; and providing deployment of combat ready forces in areas of operations as required by higher headquarters.

== History ==
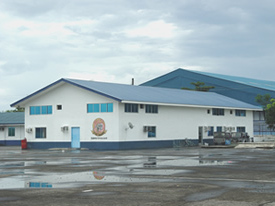
16th Attack Squadron, Office / HQ

=== Beginnings ===
The Eagles were born in the 1970s during the outbreak of hostilities in Mindanao when government forces and secessionist were engaged in a full-scale war, where the latter was strong in terms of personnel and firepower.

Confronted by this problem, the military hastily laid down the framework for a tactical unit that would accomplish the necessary air support mission. Thus, on 1 August 1974, the Philippine Air Force witnessed the foundation of the first tactical squadron, the 16th Attack Squadron, whose primary mission is to perform tactical air operation designed to destroy enemy forces and facilities.

Initially headed by Lt Col Santiago O Pitpitan Jr, it was organized out of volunteer pilots from other units and a handful of enlisted personnel who, knowing the great risk, were willing to sacrifice and take up the burden of the task at hand.

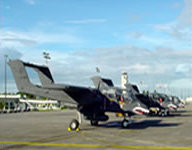
16th AS - OV-10A Bronco

=== First aircraft and missions ===
With 52 T-28D aircraft on its wings, the squadron performed a wide array of mission but it was the accurate delivery of air munitions to designated targets that this unit not only carved its name in the history of the Philippine Air Force, but the Armed Forces as well. During the late 70's, the eagles were participating in large scale joint operations against fortified MNLF strongholds in Zamboanga del Norte.

=== Dwindling logistics support ===
By the mid-80's, due to dwindling logistics support to the AT-28Ds, the 17th and 25th Attack Squadron were dissolved and fused with the eagles to cope up with the austerity measure being undertaken by the armed forces.

=== Campaigns against CPP/NPA Rebels ===
From 1989 to 1991, the concentration of operations shifted to the north particularly in Marag Valley, which was against the CPP NPA rebels. There, the eagles continued to demonstrate their exceptional skills in conducting air strike missions.

=== First OV-10A Broncos ===
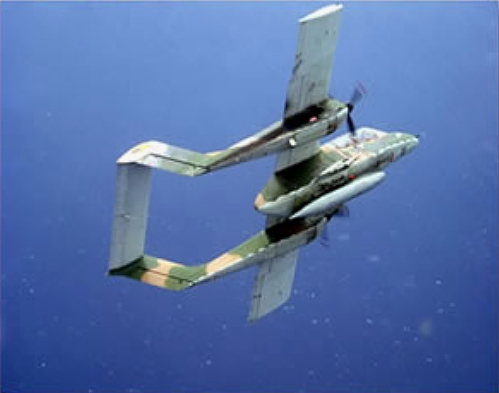
16th AS - OV-10A Bronco

By November 1991, the squadron started to receive OV-10A Broncos from the United States of America. These aircraft are proven to be an effective multi-role antiinsurgency platform. It was also expected to replace the aging and diminishing fleet of AT-28D Tora-toras. A total of 24 OV-10A Broncos were turned over by July 1992. With the arrival of the broncos, the splendor of the squadron was revived. Aside from performing air strike mission in support of ground forces, the aircraft was fitted to provide cloud seeding capability in order to help soften the impact of the El Niño phenomena. Thus, aside from being bombers, the eagles were known as cloud seeder or rainmakers.

=== Campaigns against MILF and Abu Sayyaf ===
By the year 2000, the eagles were again playing a crucial role in the campaign to capture MILF camps in central Mindanao and in pursuit of Abu Sayyaf terrorist group in western Mindanao. With these massive and extensive operations the Philippine government asserted it sovereignty over the MILF Camps and captured and destroyed them.

=== Newly upgraded OV-10's ===
By August 2003, the first batch of four OV-10Cs arrived from The Royal Air Force of Thailand. Furthermore, capability upgrade of several OV-10A to the four bladed configurations was completed. To this day the eagles are still ever vigilant protecting the peace and development of the nation.

=== Replacement of OV-10s by A-29 Super Tucanos ===
In 2021, the 15th Strike Wing received 6 new A-29B Super Tucanos to replace the aging OV-10s. As the OV-10 is retired, 6 more A-29s are planned to be acquired.

== See also ==
- 15th Strike Wing, Philippine Air Force
