= 15th Strike Wing =

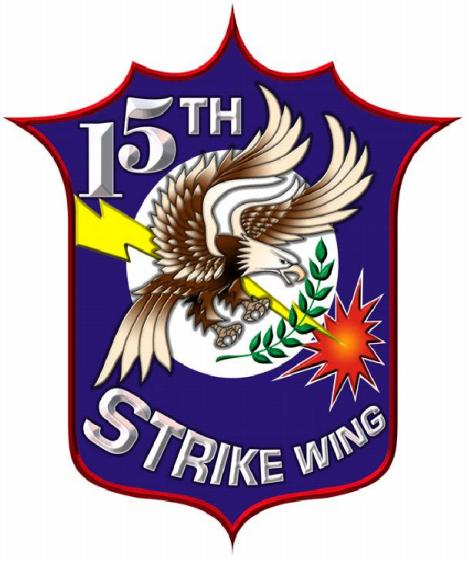
- 15th Strike Wing Emblem
- Active: since 1973
- Country: Philippines
- Branch: Philippine Air Force
- Garrison / HQ: Danilo Atienza Air Base
- Nickname: Trojans
- Anniversaries: November 26, 1973

Commanders
- Wing Commander: BGEN Gerold N. Gagan AFP.

Aircraft flown
- Attack: A-29 Super Tucano; SF-260
- Attack helicopter: McDonnell Douglas 520MG Defender; AW-109AH; TAI/AgustaWestland T129 ATAK

The 15th Strike Wing is a wing unit of the Philippine Air Force, responsible for overall tactical and ground air support operations in support of Armed Forces of the Philippines units. The unit is headquartered at Danilo Atienza Air Base, Sangley Point, Cavite, just outside the capital Manila. The Wing, as of 2009, was organized with Personal, Coordinating and Technical Staff. Under the Wing's command were units broken up into 3 major groups: Tactical, Maintenance and Supply, and Air Base. The Wing's tactical elements included the 16th, 17th, 18th, and 20th Attack Squadrons, the 19th Composite Tactical Training Squadron, and the 25th Composite Attack Squadron. Many of these units were forward deployed under the operational control of the Philippine Air Force's numerous Tactical Operations Groups. The 460th Maintenance and Supply Group and the 590th Air Base Group filled the other roles.

== History ==
=== Beginnings ===
The 15th Strike Wing was organized and activated as a provisional unit on 26 November 1973, at Sangley Point, Cavite City, with a mission statement: To conduct counter-insurgency and special warfare operations. The appointed Acting Wing Commander then was Colonel Emerito P Surio PAF (GSC), with Colonel Pompeyo P Vasquez PAF (GSC), the Deputy Commander, and a complement of two officers and ten airmen.

Initially, the Wing had six (6) Beechcraft T-34 Mentors and six (6) North American T-28 Trojans, mostly from 100th Training Wing and 5th Fighter Wing. Ten (10) airmen were sent to the 410th Air Materiel Wing to undergo maintenance on-the-job training (OJT), in February 1974. Then, additional personnel were reassigned to the Wing such that, by the end of the year, the unit had 27 officers and 288 airmen, who became the nucleus of 15th Strike Wing.

==== 18th Maintenance and Supply Squadron ====
On 1 July 1974, the 18th Maintenance and Supply Squadron (forerunner of 461st Field Maintenance Squadron), was activated and manned under the leadership of Major Salvador Cereno PAF. A month later, 16th Attack Squadron was organized in anticipation of the delivery of T-28D aircraft from Vietnam. This unit was activated and manned on 1 August 1974, with LT Colonel Santiago O Pitpitan JR PAF as Squadron Commander. Following this, the 17th Attack Squadron was activated on 1 October 1974 and was projected to man the SIAI-FRAT-260 Warriors (SF-260W). However, for several months after the unit's activation, the squadron only manned one (1) T-34A Mentor. The first batch of the Italian-made, locally assembled SF-260W Marchetti aircraft, arrived in late February 1975.

==== 302nd Special Operations Squadron ====
On 16 October 1974, the 302nd Special Operations Squadron of HPAF was placed under the command and control of the 15th Strike Wing Commander. Two days later, the Wing received the first batch of T-28D aircraft, fresh from the Vietnam War. Trained under Captain Hamilton of the US Air Force and eventually checked out as instructor pilots were: COL Barroga, LT COL PITPITAN JR, LT COL SAMSON, LT COL DAVID and MAJ Billones. These pilots made a smooth transition to the T-28D, bringing forth a new generation of PAF pilots – THE ATTACK PILOTS. Conceptualized mainly to fight insurgency in the country, this new breed of pilots has come to specialize in close air support and air interdiction against the enemies of the state.

=== Operational history ===
On 18 February 1975, after training a handful of Combat-Ready Pilots, the Wing deployed four (4) T-28D aircraft to Edwin Andrews Air Base, Zamboanga City, in support of SOWESCOM operations. Barely three days later, had the first air strike in 15th Strike Wing's history taken place in Kandiis, Province of Basilan.

On 17 March 1975, three (3) SF-260W aircraft were deployed at the 15th SW Advance Command Post at Francisco Bangoy Airport, Davao City. On 15 April of the same year, the SF-260 Marchettis, piloted by Lt Col Lana and Lt Abaday, wreaked havoc to rebel encampments in Balabagan, Sapakan and Reina Regente, in Central Mindanao.

==== 25th Attack Squadron ====
With the acquisition of additional T-28D aircraft from Udorn AFB in Thailand, another unit, the 25th Attack Squadron, was activated on 29 March 1976. It was given the task to provide close air support to ground and naval forces in the newly organized Western Command, which was then under the concurrent command of the 15th Strike Wing Commander. LT COL TERESO J ISLETA first commanded the 25th Attack Squadron with 71 officers and 36 enlisted personnel. On 13 April of that year, three (3) aircraft of the 15th Strike Wing landed at Puerto Princesa. Following this, they also made a historic landing at Kalayaan.

==== Addition of the HU-16 Albatross and Douglas C-47 Skytrain ====
In May 1976, the Grumman HU-16 Albatross was transferred to 15th Strike Wing from 530th Air Base Group in Zamboanga and was employed as a search and rescue aircraft, thus giving birth to 27th Search, Rescue and Reconnaissance Squadron. Armed with rockets, the Grumann HU-16 Albatross was utilized as Forward Air Controller and SAR aircraft with limited close air support capability. The Wing also had the C-47 Gooney Bird, which was used to ferry personnel, supplies and equipment, and performed other expeditious missions to ensure rapid deployment effectiveness of 15th Strike Wing.

==== 1979 Oil Crisis ====
Towards the end of the 1970s, the oil prices doubled, thus resulting to decrease in flying operations. A crippling shortage of spares was felt in 1979, and a drastic reorganization move was put in place to increase the operational rate of the assigned aircraft. A provisional unit was then established to consolidate all support units. This was the 20th Combat Support Group headed by LT COL NORBERTO P FERRERAS, who was also the wing's chief of maintenance.

==== Arrival of helicopters ====
For the 15th Strike Wing, the 1980s also ushered in major changes. In anticipation of the AUH-76's arrival, the 20th Air Commando Squadron was activated on 1 October 1983. In 1984, President Ferdinand Marcos facilitated the acquisition of Sikorsky AUH-76 helicopters, which the Philippine Air Force configured as a platform for rockets and machine guns, from its original design as a VIP passenger aircraft. Two (2) S-70A Blackhawks also arrived together with the three AUH-76. Two of the AUH-76 helicopters were configured as rescue helicopters, thus placing the 505th Air Rescue Squadron of the 205th Helicopter Wing under 15th Strike Wing control, on 1 April 1984. As an attack helicopter, the AUH-76 saw action not only in Mindanao but also in the Visayas and Northern Luzon as well.

Preceding the arrival of the AUH-76 was the transfer of the SF-260s, during the early part of 1983, to 100th Training Wing. Consequently, the 25th Attack Squadron was unmanned on 1 October 1983.

=== Political and financial tensions ===
With the political tension that pervaded the country after the assassination of Benigno Aquino Jr., economic instability spelled budgetary cuts for the government. Maintenance cost increased while some pilots opted to leave the service to seek for “greener pastures.” Because of this drain in personnel and equipment, the 17th Attack Squadron was unmanned on 1 August 1985, leaving the 16th Attack Squadron as the only tactical squadron under 15th Strike Wing.

==== 1986 EDSA 'People Power' Revolution ====
The 15th Strike Wing has a significant participation in the 1986 EDSA People Power Revolution. The Wing Commander, then COLONEL ANTONIO E SOTELO, led a flight of Blackhawk and Huey helicopters to join forces with rebel forces at Camp Crame. The “Sotelo Landing” tilted the balance in favor of the Enrile-Ramos faction and inspired other military commanders as well. This eventually led to the end of the 20-year Marcos Regime. Following this, Corazon Aquino assumed the office of President of the Republic becoming the first female Commander in Chief of the AFP.

==== 1986–1987 Coup Attempts ====
Between 1986 and 1987 several coup d’etats were launched against the Aquino Administration.

In January 1987, Marcos loyalists simultaneously held a colloquial “Military Exercise” at Villamor Air Base and Sangley Air Base. Several officers of the Wing were held at gunpoint at the Wing Operations Center, some were held hostage elsewhere. The coup attempt failed, before the day's end command and control of the Wing was restored.

On 28 August 1987, another attempt to overthrow the Aquino Government was mounted. Again, 15th Strike Wing stood its ground to protect Philippine national interests and integrity. At the height of the tension, at the time when rebel forces had control over TV 13 and GHQ building, two T-28Ds took off from Sangley Point and proceeded to Balara Relay Station and released deadly warnings at the vicinity of the area occupied by rebel soldiers. Later in the afternoon, the Tora-Toras struck with precision identified targets at Camp Aguinaldo. These events eventually led the rebels to raise the white flag, thus ending the coup attempt.

In December 1989, 15th Strike Wing was one of the focal points of another coup attempt, which turned out to be the bloodiest. On 30 November 1989, coup plotters began occupying the Sangley Air Base, which was considered as their ace. By midnight, all aircraft were already under the control of the rebel soldiers. Other base facilities and vital installations also fell into their hands. By early morning of December 1, rebel pilots were already set to launch air strikes. In the first seven days of December, T-28Ds piloted by rebel pilots strafed Malacañang Palace grounds; they were in control of the skies.

With Sangley Air Base under their control, the rebels had the upper hand. The government, on the other hand, realized the implications of this situation; so, 5th Fighter Wing was tasked to conduct persuasion flights. By the following morning, a flight of F-5 Freedom Fighters led by Major Danilo Atienza, conducted a persuasion flight over Sangley Air Base. But because the rebels were firm on holding their ground, the F-5 pilots were later directed to retake Sangley at all costs. As a response, air strikes were conducted, inflicting heavy damage on aircraft and facilities controlled by the enemy. Unfortunately, Major Atienza crashed after flames from the explosion of a fuel depot engulfed his F-5, killing him in the process. More than two years later, on 5 May 1992, the airfield of Sangley was renamed Major Danilo S Atienza Airfield pursuant to Republic Act 7429 in recognition of his gallantry and intrepidity.

=== Merger of 240th Composite Wing and 15th Strike Wing ===
The most drastic change in Sangley was the merging of the 240th Composite Wing and the 15th Strike Wing, in 1987. The 240th Composite Wing was unmanned on 16 January 1987; subsequently, on 24 February 1987, Sangley Air Base was recognized as a single-wing base. 15th Strike Wing then absorbed 240th CW and, from then on, functioned both as a tactical unit and as a base keeper of Sangley Air Base. Due to the increase in manpower and equipment that was brought upon by the merging of the two units, the 505th Air Rescue Squadron was transferred to the 205th Helicopter Wing on 16 July 1987.

Changes occurred in 15th Strike Wing even towards the end of the decade. On 15 July 1990, 17th Air Commando Squadron and the 25th Air Commando Training Squadron were re-manned. The 601st Liaison Squadron, the only squadron from the 240th CW to have survived the merger with 15th SW, was unmanned on the same date.

=== Reactivation of the 17th Attack Squadron ===
Another significant development in the 15th Strike Wing was the reactivation of the 17th Attack Squadron. It was deactivated in March 1998 due to dwindling air assets.

The 17th Attack Squadron was reactivated on July 16, 2001. This time with a fleet of reconfigured SF-260TPs. On November 27, 2001, a few months after the squadron's reactivation, the 17th AS conducted several missions against the secessionist Misuari Renegade Group in Zamboanga City.

=== Reactivation of the 25th Composite Attack Squadron ===
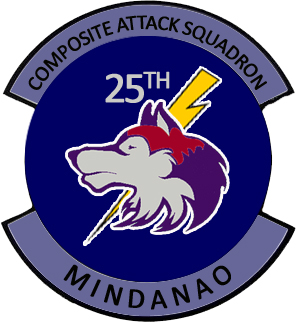
Unit seal of the 25th "LOBOS" Composite Attack Squadron.

Lt. Gen. Jose L. Reyes, during his term as Wing Commander of the 15th Strike Wing, thought of reactivating the 25th Composite Attack Squadron. On July 19, 2004, the 25th Attack Squadron or “LOBOS”, was reactivated and is based at Edwin Andrews Air Base, Zamboanga City. This unit will manage, operate and maintain the Wing's assets in Mindanao such as the OV-10 Bronco, MD-520 MG and SF-260 TP aircraft. Thirty-four (34) able officers and enlisted personnel composed the reactivated 25th CAS.

== Organization ==
The Wing is organized in the line and staff structure with Personal, Coordinating and Technical Staff. Under the Command and control of the Wing Commander are three (3) Major Groups. Namely; Tactical Group, Maintenance and Supply Group and Air Base Group.

15th Strike Wing – Organisation Structure

== Units ==
=== Tactical squadrons ===
- 16th Attack "Eagles" Squadron
- 17th Attack "Jaguars" Squadron
- 18th Attack "Falcons" Squadron
- 19th Composite Tactical Training "Griffins" Squadron
- 20th Attack "Firebirds" Squadron
- 25th Composite Attack "Lobos" Squadron

=== 460th Maintenance and Supply Group ===
- 461st Field and Depot Maintenance Squadron
- 462nd Supply Squadron
- 463rd Avionics Armaments & Maintenance Squadron

=== 590th Air Base Group ===
- 592nd Air Base Squadron
- 593rd Engineering Squadron
- 594th Air Police Squadron
- 595th Motor Vehicle Squadron
- 596th Aerodrome Operation Squadron

== Aircraft ==
=== Current aircraft ===
- SIAI Marchetti SF-260TP/W
- A-29 Super Tucano
- T129B ATAK
- McDonnell Douglas 520MG Defender
- AW-109AH

=== Former aircraft ===
- Beechcraft T-34 Mentor
- North American T-28 Trojan
- North American Rockwell OV-10A/C Bronco
- Bell AH-1 Cobra

== Wing commanders ==
15th Strike Wing Commanders
Name	Tenure
COL EMERITO P SURIO (GSC)	14 Sep 1973– 05 Sep 1974
BGEN OSCAR M ALEJANDRO AFP	06 Sep 1974 – 26 Jul 1979
BGEN ANGEL L MAPUA AFP	27 Jul 1979 – 05 Nov 1981
BGEN ANGEL C OKOL AFP	06 Nov 1981 – 16 Nov 1982
BGEN POMPEYO C VASQUEZ AFP	30 Jul 1982 – 16 Jul 1985
BGEN ANTONIO E SOTELO AFP	16 Jul 1985 – 08 Oct 1986
BGEN GENEROSO V MALIGAT AFP	08 Oct 1986 – 11 Apr 1988
BGEN GERARDO C PROTACIO AFP	12 Apr 1988 – 01 Nov 1989
BGEN TERESO J ISLETA AFP	02 Nov 1989 – 24 Apr 1990
BGEN EPINETO C LOGICO AFP	25 Apr 1990 – 28 Aug 1991
BGEN SAMSON M MAHIMER AFP	21 Aug 1991 – 18 Feb 1992
BGEN RODOLFO S ESTRELLADO AFP	18 Feb 1992 – 31 Jan 1993
BGEN RODOLFO O DIMAANO AFP	01 Aug 1993 – 10 Sep 1994
BGEN REYNALDO V REYES AFP	10 Sep 1994 – 08 Jan 1996
BGEN GERONIMO P DUMADAPAT	09 Jan 1996 – 20 Jul 1997
BGEN PAULINO P PORQUEZ AFP	20 Jul 1997 – 30 May 1999
BGEN ENRIQUE A ABAD AFP	31 May 1999 – 30 Jul 2001
BGEN DANILO AGUSTO B FRANCIA AFP	31 Jul 2001 – 02 Sep 2002
BGEN JOSE L REYES AFP	02 Sep 2002 – 28 Feb 2003
BGEN JOSE C NANO AFP	01 Mar 2003 – 04 Jul 2004
BGEN OSCAR M DE GUZMAN AFP	05 Jul 2004 – 31 Jan 2007
BGEN OSCAR H RABENA AFP	21 May 2007– 27 Jul 2008
BGEN JOSE TONY E VILLARETE AFP	27 Jul 2008 – 17 Mar 2010
BGEN ROY O DEVERATURDA AFP	08 Mar 2010 – 29 Mar 2011
BGEN EDGARDO RENE C SAMONTE AFP	18 Apr 2011 – 18 January 2012
BGEN JEFFREY F DELGADO AFP	9 January 2012 - 16 October 2012
BGEN GALILEO GERARD R KINTANAR JR AFP (GSC)	16 October 2012 - 13 March 2015
BGEN DOMINGO B PALISOC JR AFP	13 March 2015 - 13 June 2016
BGEN PELAGIO R VALUENZUELA AFP	13 June 2016 - 10 May 2018
BGEN AUGUSTO D. DELA PEÑA AFP	10 May 2018 - 13 February 2019
BGEN ARAUS ROBERT F. MUSICO AFP	13 February 2019 - 8 July 2021
BGEN ARISTOTLE D. GONZALEZ AFP	8 July 2021 – 28 March 2023
BGEN JULIAO C. LLARENAS AFP	28 March 2023 - 13 January 2025
BGEN GEROLD N. GAGAN AFP	13 January 2025 - present
