= List of Brazilian Air Force units =

List of Brazilian Air Force units is a list of currently active air and ground-based units of the Brazilian Air Force (Portuguese: Força Aérea Brasileira, FAB).

== Primary air units ==
For a long time the Brazilian Air Force was organized in Air Forces (1st (operational training), 2nd (maritime patrol and rotary wing), 3rd (air combat forces) and 5th (air transport)) and Air Regions (1st through 7th). With the ongoing reorganization of the FAB they have been disbanded in 2017 and their units were combined in 12 (initially 15) Wings called Alas.

Formation	Air unit	Codename	Aircraft type	Air base
Readiness Command (COMPREP)				
Ala 1	6º ETA	Guará	C-95M, VU-9, VC-97, C-98A	Brasília
Ala 1	Security and Defence Group - Brasília		air force infantry, firefighters and MP	Brasília
Ala 2	1º GDA (to convert to Gripen in 2021)	Jaguar	F-5EM, AT-27 (to convert to F-39 Gripen)	Anápolis
Ala 2	(1º/16º GAv - disbanded in 2016, standing up in 2019)	Adelphi	(F-39 Gripen E/F, pending delivery)	Anápolis
Ala 2	1º/6º GAv	Carcará	R-35A, R-95	Anápolis
Ala 2	2º/6º GAv	Guardião	E-99, R-99, C-98	Anápolis
Ala 2	1º GTT	Coral	C-390	Anápolis
Ala 2	Security and Defence Squadron - Anápolis		air force infantry, firefighters and MP	Anápolis
Ala 3	1º/14º GAv	Pampa	F-5EM, F-5FM, AT-27	Canoas
Ala 3	2º/7º GAv	Phoenix	P-95B	Canoas
Ala 3	5º ETA	Pegasus	C-95M, C-97	Canoas
Ala 3	Security and Defence Group - Canoas		air force infantry, firefighters and MP	Canoas
Ala 4	1º/10º GAv	Poker	A-1A, A-1B	Santa Maria
Ala 4	3º/10º GAv	Centauro	RA-1A, RA-1B	Santa Maria
Ala 4	5º/8º GAv	Pantera	H-60L	Santa Maria
Ala 4	1º/12º GAv	Orus	RQ-450 (UAV), RQ-900 (UAV)	Santa Maria
Ala 4	Security and Defence Squadron - Santa Maria		air force infantry, firefighters and MP	Santa Maria
Ala 5	3º/3º GAv	Flecha	AT-27, A-29A, A-29B	Campo Grande
Ala 5	2º/10º GAv	Pelicano	SC-95M, SC105A	Campo Grande
Ala 5	1º/15º GAv	Onça	C-105A, C-98	Campo Grande
Ala 5	Airborne Rescue Squadron	Para-SAR	SAR / CSAR paratroopers	Campo Grande
Ala 5	Security and Defence Squadron - Campo Grande		air force infantry, firefighters and MP	Campo Grande
Ala 6	2º/3º GAv	Grifo	AT-27, A-29A, A-29B	Porto Velho
Ala 6	2º/8º GAv	Poti	AH-2	Porto Velho
Ala 6	Security and Defence Squadron - Porto Velho		air force infantry, firefighters and MP	Porto Velho
Ala 7	1º/3º GAv	Escorpião	AT-27, A-29A, A-29B	Boa Vista
Ala 7	Security and Defence Squadron - Boa Vista		air force infantry, firefighters and MP	Boa Vista
Ala 8	1º/4º GAv	Pacau	F-5EM, F-5FM	Manaus
Ala 8	1º/9º GAv	Arara	C-105A	Manaus
Ala 8	7º/8º GAv	Harpia	H-60L	Manaus
Ala 8	7º ETA	Cobra	C-97, C-98	Manaus
Ala 8	Security and Defence Group - Manaus		air force infantry, firefighters and MP	Manaus
Ala 9	3º/7º GAv	Netuno	P-95A	Belém
Ala 9	1º ETA	Tracajá	C-95M, C-98, C-97	Belém
Ala 9	Security and Defence Group - Belém		air force infantry, firefighters and MP	Belém
Ala 10	1º/5º GAv	Rumba	C-95M	Natal
Ala 10	2º/5º GAv	Joker	A-29B	Natal
Ala 10	1º/8º GAv	Falção	H-36	Natal
Ala 10	1º/11º GAv	Gavião	UH-50	Natal
Ala 10	2º ETA	Pastor	C-95M, C-97	Natal
Ala 10	Tactical and Specialized Training Group			Natal
Ala 10	Security and Defence Squadron - Natal		air force infantry, firefighters and MP	Natal
Ala 11	1º/1º GT	Gordo	C-130H/KC-130H	Galeão
Ala 11	1º/2º GAv	Condor	C-99	Galeão
Ala 11	2º/2º GAv	Corsário	KC-767	Galeão
Ala 11	Security and Defence Group - Galeão		air force infantry, firefighters and MP	Galeão
Ala 11	Security and Defence Group - Rio de Janeiro		air force infantry, firefighters and MP	Rio de Janeiro
Ala 12	1º/1º GAvCa	Jambock	F-5EM, AT-27	Santa Cruz
Ala 12	2º/1º GAvCa	Pif-Paf	F-5EM, AT-27	Santa Cruz
Ala 12	1º/7º GAv	Orungan	P-3AM, RQ-1150 (UAV)	Santa Cruz
Ala 12	3º/8º GAv	Puma	H-34, H-36	Santa Cruz
Ala 12	3º ETA	Pioneiro	C-95M, C-97	Santa Cruz
Ala 12	Security and Defence Squadron - Santa Cruz		air force infantry, firefighters and MP	Santa Cruz
1st Air Defence Brigade	Brigade HQ			Brasília
1st Air Defence Brigade	1º GDAAE		RBS 70, 9K38 Igla	Canoas
1st Air Defence Brigade	2º GDAAE		RBS 70, 9K38 Igla	Manaus
1st Air Defence Brigade	3º GDAAE		RBS 70, 9K38 Igla	Anápolis
General Support Command (COMGAP)				
São Paulo Air Base	Under the Air Force reorganization plan Ala 13 was formed at São Paulo AB. This decision was revised after its 4º ETA has been disbanded in January 2018. However, without flying units homebased there São Paulo remains an active air base and it was therefore put under the COMGAP authority.	No permanent flying units assigned.		São Paulo–Guarulhos IAP
Air Force Economy, Finances and Administration Secretariat (SEFA)				
Fortaleza Air Base	These air bases have been reduced in status to reserve (Forward) Deployment Air Bases (Bases de Desdobramento) and assigned to the SEFA.	No permanent flying units assigned.		Fortaleza
Salvador Air Base	These air bases have been reduced in status to reserve (Forward) Deployment Air Bases (Bases de Desdobramento) and assigned to the SEFA.	No permanent flying units assigned.		Salvador
Santos Air Base	These air bases have been reduced in status to reserve (Forward) Deployment Air Bases (Bases de Desdobramento) and assigned to the SEFA.	No permanent flying units assigned.		Santos
Florianópolis Air Base	These air bases have been reduced in status to reserve (Forward) Deployment Air Bases (Bases de Desdobramento) and assigned to the SEFA.	No permanent flying units assigned.		Florianópolis
Afonsos Air Base	These air bases have been reduced in status to reserve (Forward) Deployment Air Bases (Bases de Desdobramento) and assigned to the SEFA.	No permanent flying units assigned.		Afonsos

Designation Examples:

1° Grupo de Defesa Aérea (1.° GDA) - 1st Air Defence Group - the fighter unit covering the capital Brasília. In the past squadrons constituted groups. Today the squadrons are independent units and their group designations are purely ceremonial.

2º Esquadrão / 1º Grupo de Aviação de Caça (2º/1º GAvCa) - 2nd Squadron / 1st Fighter Aviation Group. 1º/1º GAvCa and 2º/1º GAvCa carry on the traditions of the Brazilian fighter units that took part in the Italian Campaign of World War II.

3º Esquadrão de Transporte Aéreo (3º ETA) - 3rd Air Transport Squadron - regional liaison and utility squadrons, formerly under the Air Regions.

1° Grupo de Transporte (1º GT) - 1st Transport Group

1° Grupo de Transporte de Tropa (1º GTT) - 1st Troop Transport Group - its main task is support of the Brazilian Army's airborne brigade.

Esquadrão de Demonstração Aérea (EDA) - Air Display Squadron, the famous Smoke Squadron, attached to the Air Force Academy.

Esquadrão Aeroterrestre de Salvamento (EAS) - Airborne Rescue Squadron, also known by its patch Para-SAR, the Air Force's elite special forces unit.

Grupo (ou Esquadrão) de Segurança e Defesa - Belém (GSD-BE) - Security and Defence Group (or Squadron) - regional units, former air force infantry battalions under the Air Regions.

1ª Brigada de Defesa Antiaérea (1ª BDAAE) - 1st Air Defence Brigade

== Secondary air units ==
Formation	Air unit	Aircraft type	Air base
Office of the Commander of the Brazilian Air Force (GAB COMAER)			
Special Transport Group (GTE)	1°/1°GTE	VC-1A, VC-2	Brasília International Airport
Special Transport Group (GTE)	2°/1°GTE	VU-35A, VU-55C, VC-99A/B/C, VU-35A	Brasília International Airport
Special Transport Group (GTE)	3°/1°GTE	VH-34, VH-36, VH-35, VH-55	Brasília International Airport
Aerial Demonstration Squadron (attached to the Air Force Academy)	EDA	A-29B	Pirassununga
Department of Airspace Control (DECEA)			
Special Flight Inspection Group (GEIV)		IU-50, IC-95B/ IC-95C, IU-93A	Rio de Janeiro-Santos Dumont
Department of Aerospace Science and Technology (DCTA)			
Alcântara Launch Center (CLA)		H-50	Alcântara Launch Center
Research and Flight Testing Institute (IPEV)		A-1B/M, A-29B, C-95B, C-97, XU-93, U-35, H-60L, T-27, CH-55	São José dos Campos
General Command of Personnel (COMGEP): Training Department (DEPENS)		C-95A, UH-50, U-7	Pirassununga
Air Force Academy	1º EIA	T-27 Tucano	Pirassununga
Air Force Academy	2º EIA	T-25A/C	Pirassununga
Air Force Academy	Ultralight Club	T-8A/B	Pirassununga
Air Force Academy	Glider Club	U-19, Z-15, Z-16, TZ-13	Pirassununga
Aeronautical Instruction and Adaptation Center (CIAAR)		C-95, T-25C	Belo Horizonte / Pampulha
Air Force Cadets Preparatory School (EPCAR)		C-98, T-25C	Barbacena / Maj.-Bgd. Doorgal Borges AP
Aeronautical Specialists School (EEAR)		C-95, C-98 instructional airframes	Guaratinguetá

== See also ==
- Brazilian Air Force
