= Brazilian Air Force Academy =

Air Force Academy
- Academia de Força Aérea
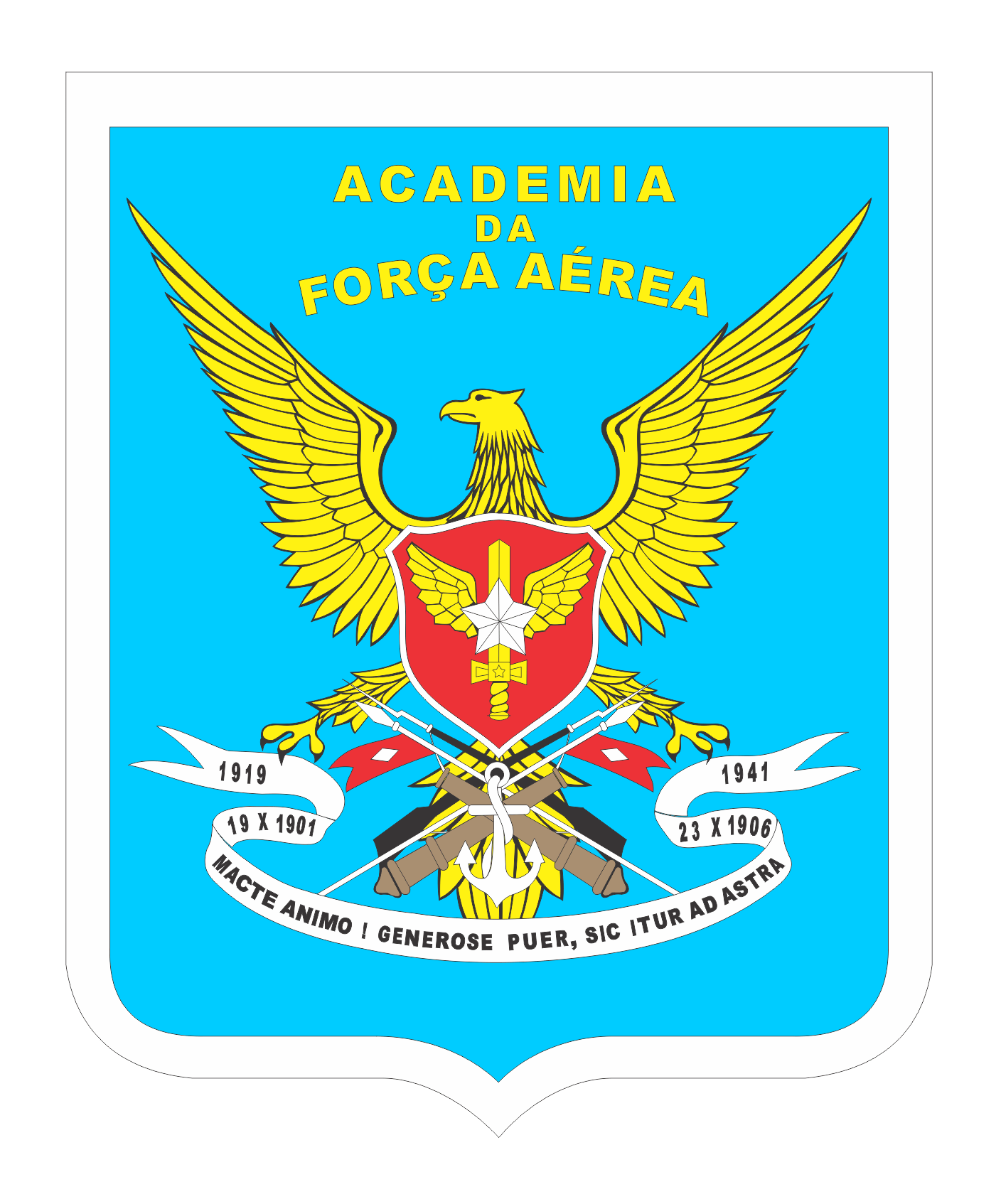
- Motto: Macte animo! Generose puer sic itur ad astra (Latin)
- Motto in English: Young, cheer up! This is the way to the skies (from Aeneid by Virgil IX, 641)
- Type: Air force academy
- Established: 17 October 1960
- Commander: Brig. Marcelo Gobett Cardoso
- Undergraduates: More than 700 cadets (Aviation, Intendency, Infantry
- Location: Pirassununga, São Paulo, 13643-000, Brazil; 21°59′07″S 047°20′07″W
- Campus: Air Force Base, 251.246 m^{2}
- Language: Portuguese
- Nickname: Eagle's Cradle (Ninho das Águias)
- Website: www.afa.aer.mil.br

The Brazilian Air Force Academy (AFA, Academia da Força Aérea in Portuguese) is the Brazilian Air Force's educational institution that provides initial officer training for the main Officer Board of Brazil's Air Force Command. The academy is located east of Pirassununga city, in São Paulo State county, and it is the largest Brazilian Air Base as well as the largest Air Force Academy of Latin America. All three Officer Formation Courses (CFOs) of Academia da Força Aérea are recognized as Superior Degree by Brazil's Ministry of Educations.

The academy fulfills its mission of "training officers for the Air Force Aviators Board, Air Force Quartermasters Board and Air Force Infantry Boards, developing the attributes in each cadet on military martiality, intellectuals and professionals, in addition to ethical, moral, civic and social concerns, obtaining, at the end of this process, a position to become leaders of a modern Air Force". The Air Force Academy is, along with Academia Militar das Agulhas Negras (Military Academy of the Black Needles) and Escola Naval (Naval College), one of the Brazilian Military Academies.

The Air Force Academy is the home base of the First and Second Aerial Instruction Squadrons as well as home of the internationally known Smoke Squadron. In Aeronautics Instruction matters Academia have one of the most selective military aviation trainings of the World. Cadets learn to fly as second year strats, and with less than 15 hours of experience cadets must be already able to perform the solo flight.

== History ==
=== Early years ===
The idea for the Brazilian Air Force dates back to World War I, when fitted to the Brazilian Navy to take the initiative to organize the first military aviation core in Brazil. On 23 August 1916, then President Wenceslao Braz, founded the Naval Aviation School, while the Navy Minister, Admiral Alencar Faria of Alexandria, began negotiations for the acquisition of the first Brazilian military aircraft in order to equip an aviation school. There were three Curtiss Model F acquired from the United States.

The Brazilian Army would only have its Military Aviation School after the Great War. On 15 January 1919, by Federal Decree, was opened a credit for establishing a Military Aviation Service. The service has been provided with infrastructure by acquiring aircraft and other necessary materials, and for the school staff, teachers and other workers for maintenance were hired.

The official opening of the Military Aviation School took place on 10 July 1919, and Lieutenant Colonel Stanislaus Vieira Pamplona was its first commander. The School planes which came to Brazil in 1919 and 1920, were French, from World War I, the Nieuport and Spad 84 "Herbermont".

For many years, military aviation was shared between Navy and Army. However, the creation of a new and independent Force formed part of the idealistic musings of Major Augustus Lysias Rodrigues, Military Aviator and one of the first in the Ministry of Aeronautics in Brazil. Major Lysias, however, enthusiastically raised his voice at a time when both the Military and Naval Aviation had not yet reached full development, getting his ideas kept for many years, coming to realize at the outbreak of World War II.

The Ministry of Aeronautics was established by Federal Decree 2961 January 20, 1941, and shortly after its creation, the new military force felt the need to intensify staff training. The Air Force, at imminent expansion because of the exigencies of war, that was almost reaching Brazilian lands, has led to an immediate program to accelerate the training pace of navigators and specialists. Moreover, the new Ministry had just inherit, from Army and Navy aviations, two training centers which, for obvious reasons, should be homogenized. Therefore, both Military Aviation School and Naval Aviation School were closed down, as it was created in Afonsos AFB the School of Aeronautics, on 25 March 1941, which would centralize all training of aviator officers . On the tip of the Galleon Airport, for training of maintenance personnel, was established the Escola de Especialistas da Aeronáutica (School of Aeronautics Expert) on the premises of the former Naval Aviation School.

=== The Academy ===
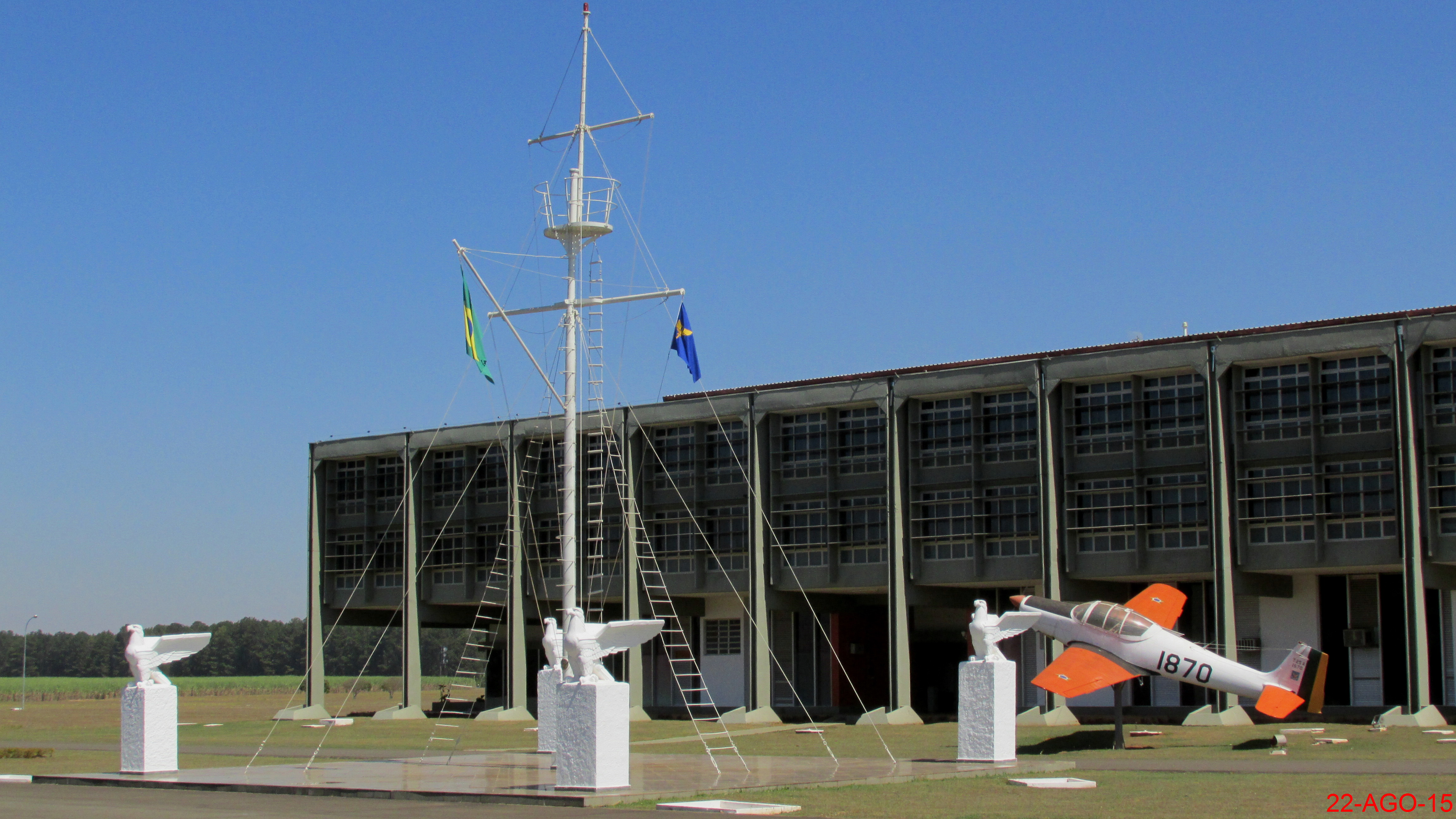
One of the buildings in 2015

On 23 January 1942, was designated an official commission of aviator officers with the purpose of choosing a new location, free from the limitations of the Afonsos AFB, for the construction of a new School of Aeronautics. Among the places mooted, was selected the State of São Paulo, especially the cities of Campinas, Pirassununga, Rio Claro and Ribeirao Preto. The choice of Pirassununga resulted from exceptional topographical features offered in the area (the place was called the Upper Field, east of town). The construction of the first hangars of the new School of Aeronautics was initiated in 1942, even though the war was not yet over. In 1949, the Ministry of Aeronautics appointed a new group of officers to present the project of the new School, which resulted in the Study and Construction of the School of Aeronautics, with the proposal of updating the School project, arranging and supervising the construction. On 17 July 1956, another commission was named to prepare the final draft of the School, which should meet the two phases. Firstly, moving to Pirassununga the last year of the Aviator Officer Formation Course and later the establishment of the Pirassununga Facilities as the new School of Aeronautics. On 17 October 1960, opened the Precursor Aeronautical Detachment, during the festivities of the Wing Week, in the presence of his Excellency Mr. Minister of Aeronautics and Commander of Brazilian Air Force, Air Lieutenant Brigadier Francisco de Assis Correa de Mello, the Governor of the State of São Paulo and other senior officials. The new School first commander was Aviator Major Aloysio Otter Netto. The buildings were few and poor, with only two hangars. The accommodations and infrastructure facilities were mostly concentrated in the old Support Division building. The runways were grassy and much more shorter than current runways.

The year 1968 was crowned with the arrival of jet aircraft T-37C, which would mark the beginning of a new era. On 9 September, was made the first flight instruction of cadets in that aircraft. On 10 July 1969, the School of Aeronautics was renamed the Academia da Força Aérea (Air Force Academy) also well known in Brazil just by the acronym AFA. In 1971, the Air Force Academy was definitely transferred from Afonsos AFB to Pirassununga, as its first commander was Air Brigadier Geraldo Labarthe Lebre. At that time, the Air Force Cadets Corps had already been removed from the Support Division, which today is the accommodation of staff sergeants and subofficers, to the Fourth Cadets Squadron building, where were the fourth year cadets.

AFA's facilities were built according to a project (Master Plan), which can be modified in accordance with any requirements if approved by the competent authorities. The academy has a building area of 215,246 m^{2}, with 141,800 square feet (13,170 m^{2}) of administrative area and 73,246 square feet (6,804.8 m^{2}) of residential area. For its operation, AFA has a water treatment station with a water network spanning approximately 15 km and maintaining a capacity / day to 6,000,000 liters, using the waters of the Rio Mogi Guaçu; has, in electric power system, 41 km of overhead and underground voltage network, and a 50 km of roads and a telephone network with about 23 km.

== Academics ==
The Air Force Academy offers three different graduation courses, Aviator Officer Formation Course (Curso de Formação de Oficial Aviador – CFOAv), Quartermaster Officer Formation Course (Curso de Formação de Oficial Itendente – CFOInt) and Infantry Officer Formation Course (Curso de Formação de Oficial de Infantaria – CFOInf). Concomitantly, at all the three courses is taught Public Administration, recognised by the Ministry of Educations, which is very similar to business school. The courses have a duration of 4 years in boarding and dedication. At the end of the CFO the graduated cadets are declared Officer Candidates.

As soon as registered, the young man or woman receives the responsibilities inherent in the situation of Cadets: COURAGE, LOYALTY, HONOR, DUTY and PATRIOTISM which are the pillars of the Code of Honor of the Air Force Cadets Corps. The moral, scientific, military and technical expertise are taught by civilian and military instructors, that follow a sequence of knowledge within modern educational patterns, coordinated by the Education Division of the academy, along with the Cadets Corps.

The Applied Mathematics, Computers, Electricity, Mechanics, Physics, Chemistry, Portuguese Language, Spanish Language, English Language, Psychology, Sociology, Business and Law, among other disciplines, provide the foundation necessary for cultural and scientific development of future academic Aviator Officers, Quartermasters and Air Force Infantry.

=== Aviator officer ===
The Aviator Cadets are future Air Force pilots. During four years of progress, they study subjects of administration in order to take positions of leadership in the sections of the Air Force's Institutions, either in an air Squadron, an Air Base or other Air Force's operational institution. Besides this general academic side, common to all three courses of the academy, the aviators still have technique-specific academic subjects inherent in air activity.

Aerodynamics, Jet Propulsion, Air Navigation, Air Traffic, Aviation Technical English, Aerospace Medical Sciences and Meteorology are some subjects of the specific part of Aviator's grid, who in addition to bachelors in Administration, still leave graduates in Aeronautical Sciences, also recognized by the Ministry of Educations as Superior Degree. The Aviator Officer Formation Course is extremely demanding, requires dedication and perseverance of the cadet to keep up matters of academic performance both at the General and Specific areas, besides the physical training, military activities and especially the Flying at Second and Fourth Years.

Upon graduation, Aviator Cadets are split into three Operational Specialization Squadrons. "Joker Squadron" (2nd Squadron / 5th Air Group) teaches Embraer EMB-314 Super Tucano ground school and the basic skills for Fighter Pilots. The "Gavião Squadron" (11th Air Group) teaches the Eurocopter AS350 "Esquilo" Helicopter Ground school and forms all Helicopter Pilots for the Air Force. Yet, there is the "Rumba Squadron" (1st Squadron / 5th Air Group) administering the course of the Embraer EMB 110 Bandeirante, forming at the end of one year the new pilots for the operational squadrons of Air Transport and Air Maritime Patrol (which in Brazil is an Air Force's task).

=== Quartermaster officer ===
The Quartermaster, in Brazilian Military Forces, is responsible for the significant part of logistics, which earned it the nickname "Queen of Logistics". The Quartermaster is responsible for procurement activities (food, uniforms and equipment, fuels, weaponry, oils and lubricants; recoverables, and others), transportation of personnel and supplies. At military campaign, the quartermaster officer is responsible for facilities services, laundry, folding, parachute maintenance and burial fulfillments. When serving as leader of an Air Force Institution's section, he is generally responsible for the supplies, financial management, and internal control.

Quartermaster Cadets are prepared with both classes and practical exercises for the tasks of a surface combatant integrated with the Logistics System Air Force Command. The course provides knowledge acquisition on Logistics, Mobile Quartermaster Units, Budget Execution, Procurement, Planning, Public Management, Internal Control Management, disciplines that are part of the specialized technical field Curriculum of CFOInt.

When completed his academic studies, the graduated cadet is presented in the Military Section for which was classified, to perform administrative and operational activities as part of the Air Force Quartermaster's Board of Officers.

== Military training and athletics ==
Physical Education and Military Training are taught daily.

== Air instruction ==
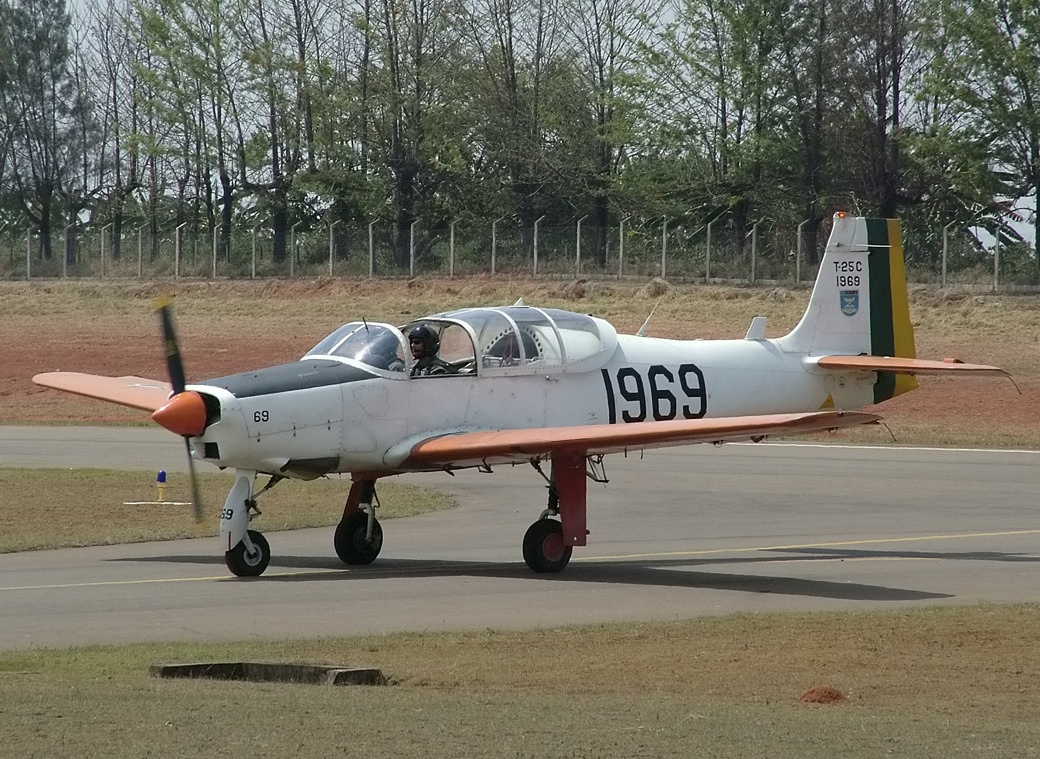
Neiva T-25 Universal (FAB)

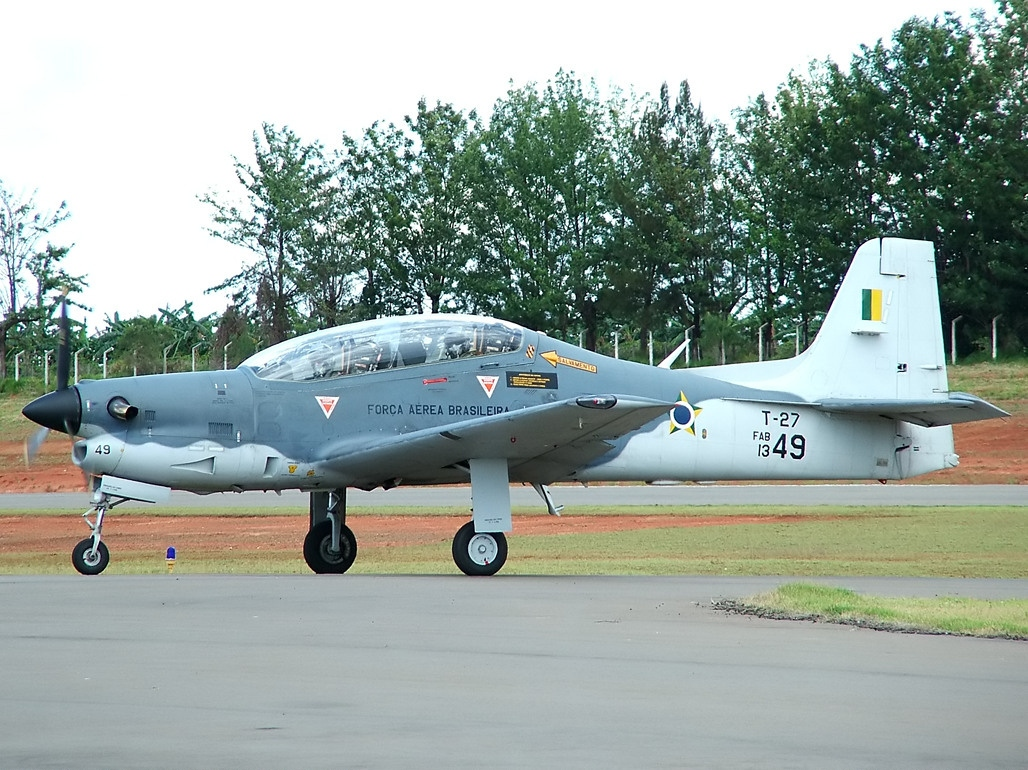
Embraer T-27 Tucano (FAB)

The Aviator Cadets start flying at the second year of the course. Besides all the academic studies, the Air Cadets join the Second Aerial Instruction Squadron (Segundo Esquadrão de Instrução Aérea – EIA) and start the theory classes of Neiva T-25 Universal basic trainer, classes about both normal and emergency procedures within the instruction area, and theory behind all practical exercises that will be performed at the next weeks. The theoretical part of the course is extremely demanding, usually cadets have to get nothing less than 90% of correct answers at the final examinations, otherwise they practically end their chances of completing Second EIA and graduating as Air Force Pilots. At the end of Second EIA Course, the surviving cadets have nearly 50 flight hours accumulated.

Both T-25 and T-27 courses are subdivided in four series of flight missions: Pre-Solo, Maneuvers and Acrobatics, Formation Flight and Navigation. In order to select only the best pilots for military service, about one third of the original number of Air Cadets are eliminated of the Aviation, most of them during pre-solo missions. Usually, the eliminated air cadets stay in AFA, joining the Quartermaster or Infantry cadets, but many of them just leave the academy. These high losses turned the Aviator Officer Formation Course the most difficult and demanding Officer Formation Course of all Brazilian Military Forces.

At the fourth year, the surviving aviator cadets join the First Aerial Instruction Squadron (Primeiro Esquadrão de Instrução Aérea) and start the course of the Brazilian-made turboprop Embraer T-27 Tucano. This time, the cadets fly nearly 120 hours all over the year, learning more complex acrobatics, four-aircraft Formation Flights and IFR navigation. At the end of the year, almost graduating as Aviator Officers, the top 30 pilots are designated for the Fighter Pilot Course. The rest of them are distributed between the Helicopter and MultiEngine Aircraft Schools.

During the Academy Course, pilots learn maneuvers like Stall, Spin, Lazy Eight, Barrel Roll, Looping, Split-S, Chandelle, Immelmann and Cuban Eight. AFA pilots are able to sustain two and four aircraft formations as wingmen, and are also able to perform nearly 2,000-mile (3,200 km) navigation with full understanding of both visual and instrumental flight rules and night flights.

== Gliding club ==
The club which vacancies are most crowded is the Clube de Vôo a Vela (CVV – literally " Sailing Flight Club" in Portuguese). Since 1976, the CVV teaches the extracurricular glider pilot course for Academy cadets. The extremely exhaustive routine makes many cadets choose to exercise the relaxing activity of gliding.

Besides, the supreme majority of aviator cadets actually join the academy with very little or none real flight experience. This, plus the high number of cadets eliminated in the second year, makes many of these first-year cadets wishing to join the CVV and gain valuable flight experience, which can make the very difference between staying or leaving the academy during the 2nd Aerial Instruction Squadron.

The Gliding Club is obviously the most prominent. They have high performance gliders, Schleicher ASW 20 and "Libelle", and has two tugs Embraer EMB-202 Ipanema. Before learning to fly, the new members of the club must first pass through tests on technical knowledge and flight procedures of Gliding Flight and accumulate a substantial number of hours as Club's supporters.

The Gliding Club enables cadets having constant contact with the air activity, developing team spirit, fellowship, camaraderie and mutual trust between them.

== Admission ==
All young man or woman, between seventeen and twenty-three years old, that wishes to join the academy as cadets must firstly subscribe for the Academy Admission Process. Generally the submissions period take time between May and June. (complete with the number of vacancies)

=== Theoretical examinations ===
The first step becoming an air force cadet is get a good performance at the theoretical examination. All candidates must undergo an 80 questions test, with 20 questions per subject (Maths, physics, Portuguese Language and English Language). The difficulty level of the exams is very high for Brazilian standards. But even so, the level of exams are not as high as the examinations of the Instituto Militar de Engenharia (Military Institute of Engineering) or the Instituto Tecnológico de Aeronáutica (Aeronautical Institute of Technology). Nearly 10000 candidates apply for the examinations, however only the 650 best are selected for the next phases of the Academy Admission Process.

=== Secondary examinations ===
==== Air Cadets Preparatory School (EPCAr) ====
The Brazilian Air Force, looking for a previously good formation for their cadets after war, created the CPCAR (Air Cadets Preparatory Course), what is a previously course of Air Force School (at Campo dos Afonsos, also known as "cradle of military Brazilian aviation"), in 1949. In May, 21 of 1949, the president created at the Ministry of Aeronautic the decree 26.514, establishing the CPCAR.

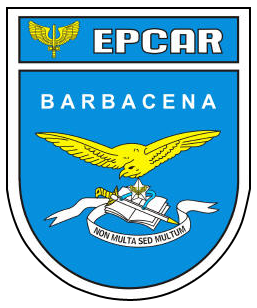
The school arms says: Non Multa, Sed Multum ("Not too much, but the best").

The EPCAr (Air Cadets Preparatory School) is situated at Barbacena-MG, Brazil. The school works like a high school, but not an ordinary one. During the three years of course, the student (equivalent to a 3° sergeant) learns in the general field the same disciplines of normal high school, but in the military field they learn how to valorize their career and ideal, how to act like a military-man, as well how to lead their conducts with the country's interests. After the three years, the students who passed the final academic exams, the rigorous medical exams and the pilot aptitude test, guarantee the access to Military Pilot Course, at AFA (CFOAv in Brazilian acronym).

Every year, EPCAr opens 180 vacancies for the CPCAR. Until 2015 there were vacancies open for men only, that changed in the following year when 20 vacancies were open for women (CPCAR is now made up of 160 male and 20 female students). The graduated students go to AFA with all need military, human and life knowledge to become an Air Force cadet, and later after concluding the course an Air Force officer.

== Airborne Units ==
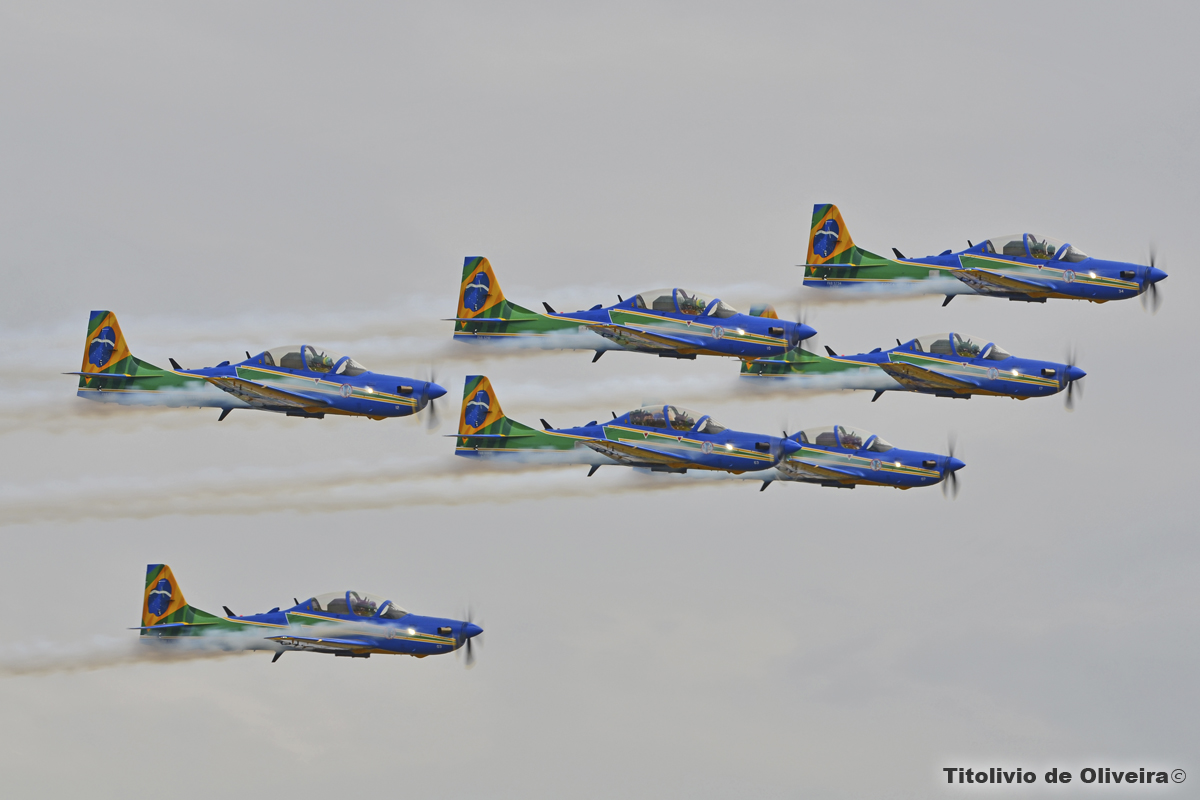
Embraer T-27 Super Tucanos of the Smoke Squadron at Pirassununga in 2014

The following airborne units are based at the academy:

- 1st Squadron of Instruction (1°EIA) Cometa, using the Embraer T-27 Tucano. This aircraft is used for the instruction of fourth year cadets.
- 2nd Squadron of Instruction (2°EIA) Apolo, using the Neiva T-25 Universal. This aircraft is used for the instruction of second year cadets.
- Squadron of Air Demonstration (EDA) Esquadrilha da Fumaça, using the A-29A & B Super Tucano.

== See also ==
- Brazilian Air Force
