= Smoke Squadron =

- Esquadrilha da Fumaça
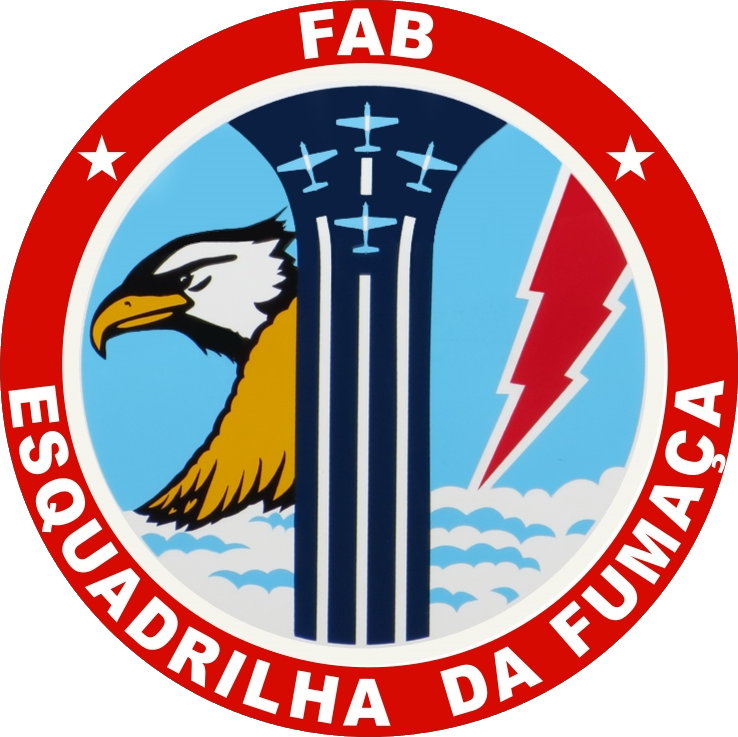
- Smoke Squadron insignia
- Active: 14 May 1952; 73 years ago
- Country: Brazil
- Branch: Brazilian Air Force
- Role: Aerobatic display team
- Garrison/HQ: Brazilian Air Force Academy
- Colors: Green, Yellow and Blue
- Website: http://fumaca.org/ https://www2.fab.mil.br/eda/

Aircraft flown
- Attack: Embraer EMB-314 Super Tucano

The Aerial Demonstration Squadron (Portuguese: Esquadrão de Demonstração Aérea, EDA), popularly known as Smoke Squadron (Portuguese: Esquadrilha da Fumaça) is the Brazilian Air Force's air demonstration squadron. It is headquartered at the Brazilian Air Force Academy in Pirassununga, São Paulo.

== History ==
Its first display was on 14 May 1952 over Copacabana beach, using the North American T-6 Texan. The team used the T-6 from its formation until 1968, when it switched to the French Aérospatiale (Fouga) CM.170-2 Super Magister jet, called T-24 in FAB service. However, this model proved unsuitable to Brazilian conditions and, in 1972, the squadron reverted to the T-6, which was used until 1977.

The EDA was disbanded in 1977, but reformed on 8 December 1983 using Neiva T-25 Universal piston-powered aircraft, soon to be replaced by the then-new Embraer EMB-312 Tucano turboprop trainer. At the time the EDA's aircraft were painted a bright red scheme, which has since been superseded by the current gloss blue.

== Objectives ==
The stated objective of the Smoke Squadron are:

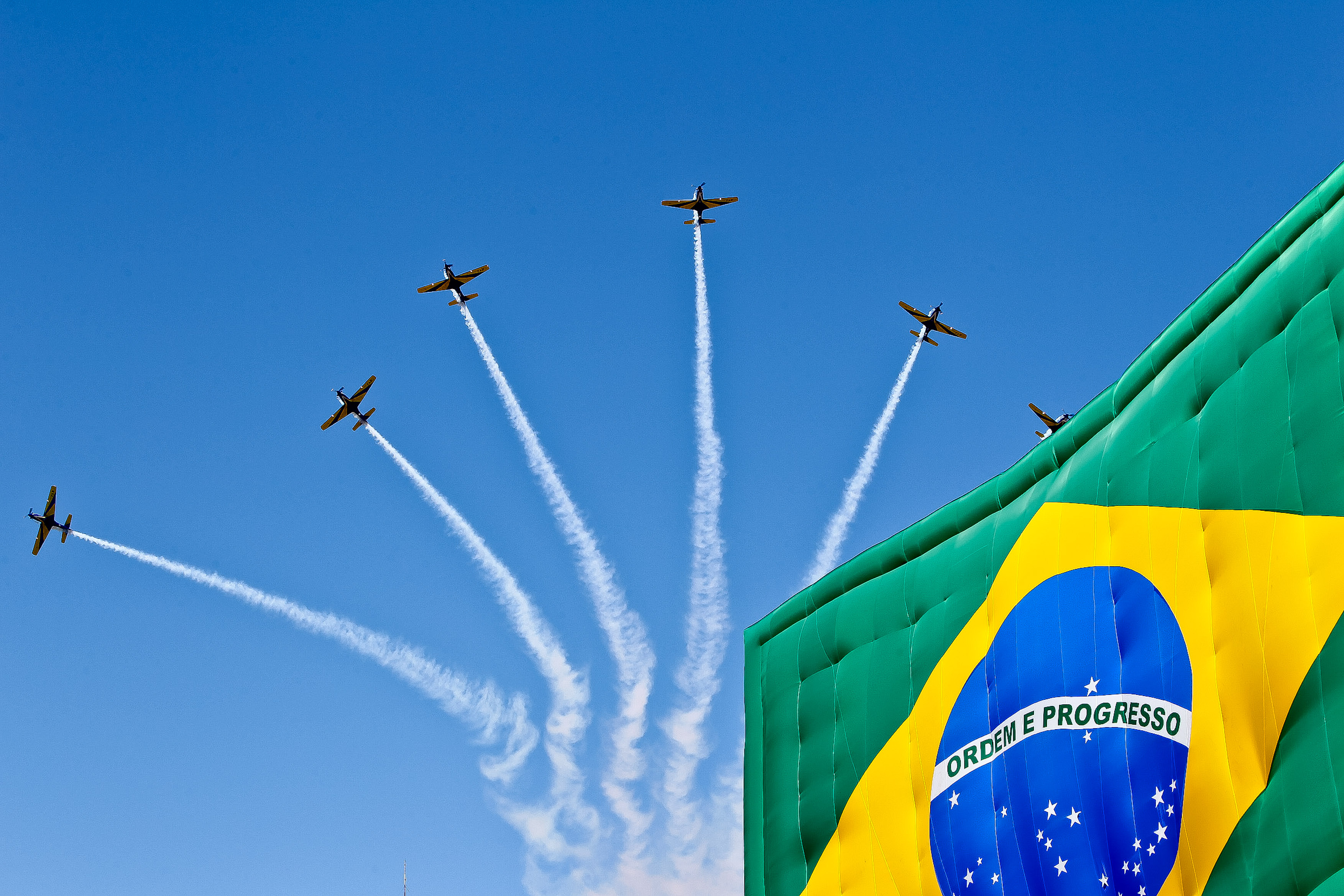
"Esquadrilha da Fumaça" during 2011 Brazilian Independence Day celebrations

- To bring together civilian and military aeronautical communities
- To contribute towards a better integration between the Air Force and the other Armed Forces
- To represent the Brazilian Air Force in Brazil and abroad
- To encourage youngsters to take up civilian and military aeronautical careers
- To show the quality of the Brazilian aerospace industry
- To show the capabilities of the Brazilian Air Force crews.

== Aircraft ==
The aircraft used by the EDA have been, in chronological order:

- North American T-6 Texan for 1225 displays;
- Aérospatiale (Fouga) CM.170-2 Super Magister for 46 displays;
- Neiva T-25 Universal for 55 displays;
- Embraer EMB-312 Tucano with more than 2000 displays as of 2010;
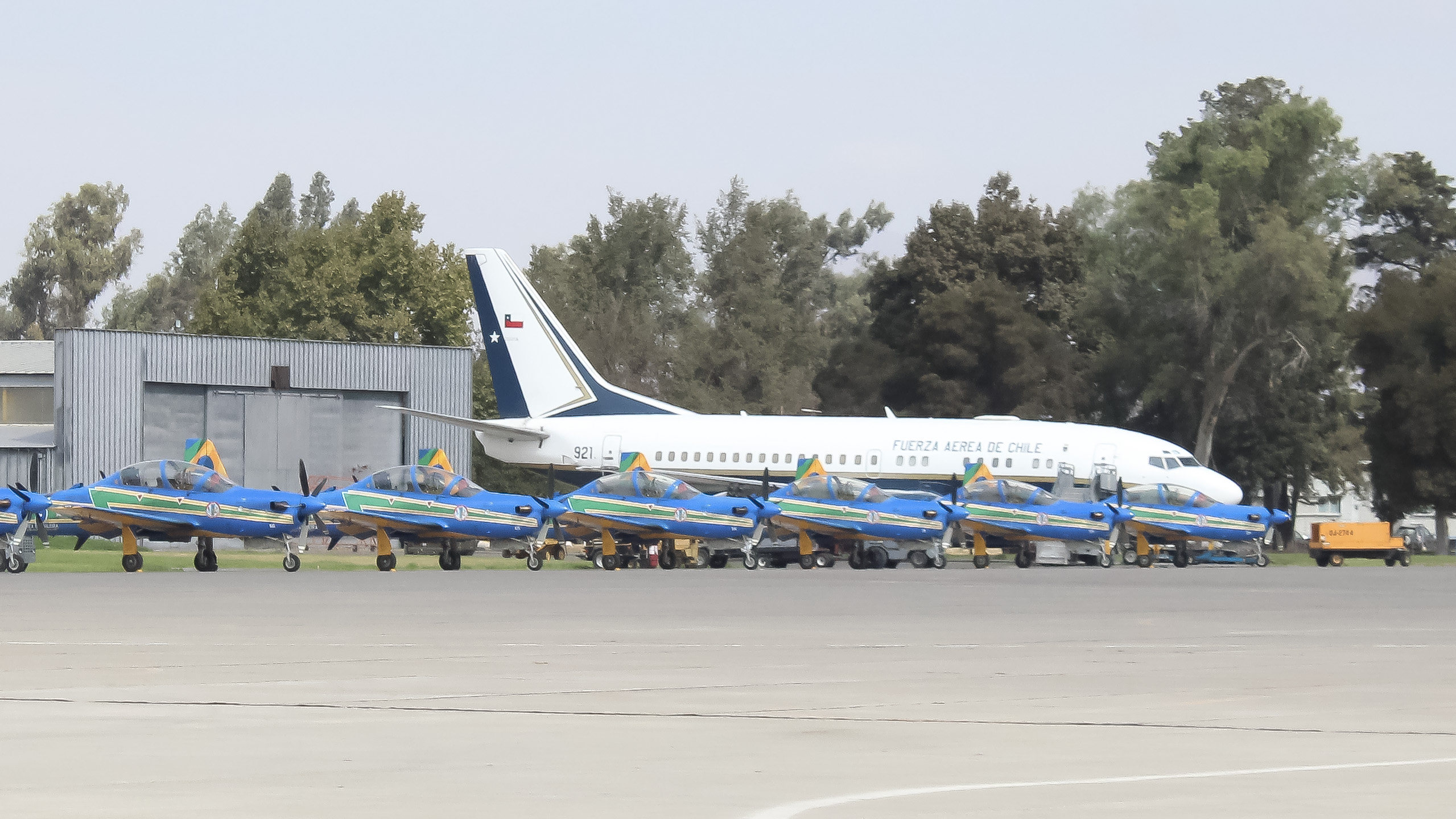
- The fleet of Super Tucanos, with a Chilean 737-500VIP government transport behind them.
  Embraer EMB-314 Super Tucano, being the two first ones delivered on September 30, 2012. In the subsequent two years, Super Tucanos have replaced the Tucano in the Smoke Squadron
