= Air force academy =

An air force academy or air academy is a national institution that provides initial officer training, possibly including undergraduate level education, to air force officer cadets who are preparing to be commissioned officers in a national air force. The world's first air academy was the RAF (Cadet) College (now called the Royal Air Force College) which was founded on 1 November 1919 on the site of a Royal Navy flying training station.

== List of air force academies ==
- The Air Force Academy, Finnish Air Force in Jyväskylä, Finland
- The Republic of China Air Force Academy of Taiwan, founded in 1928
- The Accademia Aeronautica of Italy, founded in 1923
- The Brazilian Air Force Academy (Academia da Força Aérea), founded in 1960
- The Bangladesh Air Force Academy, founded in 1974 as BAF Cadets’ Training Unit
- The Royal Danish Air Force Officers School, founded in 1951
- The École de l'air of France
- The Air Force Academy of India
- The Indonesian Air Force Academy, founded in 1945
- The Egyptian Air Academy, founded in 1951
- The Gagarin Air Force Academy, Russian Air Force, founded in 1940
- The Hellenic Air Force Academy of Greece, founded in 1919 as the Military Academy of Aviation, became the Air Force School in 1931
- The Korea Air Force Academy, founded as the Aviation Academy in 1949
- The Norwegian Air Force Academy, founded in 1949
- The Pakistan Air Force Academy, founded as a flying training school in 1947 and became a college in 1948, redesignated as an academy in 1967
- The Polish Air Force Academy, founded in 1927
- The Portuguese Air Force Academy (Academia da Força Aérea), founded in 1978
- The Sri Lanka Air Force Academy, founded in 1976
- The Turkish Air Force Academy, founded in 1951
- The Royal Air Force College Cranwell of the United Kingdom, founded in 1916 as a naval air training base, became an air force college in 1919
- The United States Air Force Academy, founded in 1954
- The Zhukovsky Air Force Engineering Academy, Russian Air Force, founded in 1920
- The Zhukovsky – Gagarin Air Force Academy, Russian Air Force, amalgamation of the Zhukovsky Air Force Engineering Academy and Gagarin Air Force Academy in 2008
- The Israeli Air Force flight academy trains aircrew to operate Israeli Air Force aircraft, qualifying fighter, helicopter and transport pilots as well as combat and transport navigators.
- The Navaminda Kasatriyadhiraj Royal Thai Air Force Academy founded in 1953

== See also ==
- Naval academy
