= Orungan =

Yoruba deity

In Yoruba religion, Orungan was the son of Yemaja and Aganju.

According to some stories, he ravished his mother once, and as he tried a second time, Yemaja fell and burst open, whereupon the fifteen Orishas came forth from her.
