= Embraer EMB 312 Tucano =

Brazilian turboprop trainer and light attack aircraft

EMB 312 Tucano
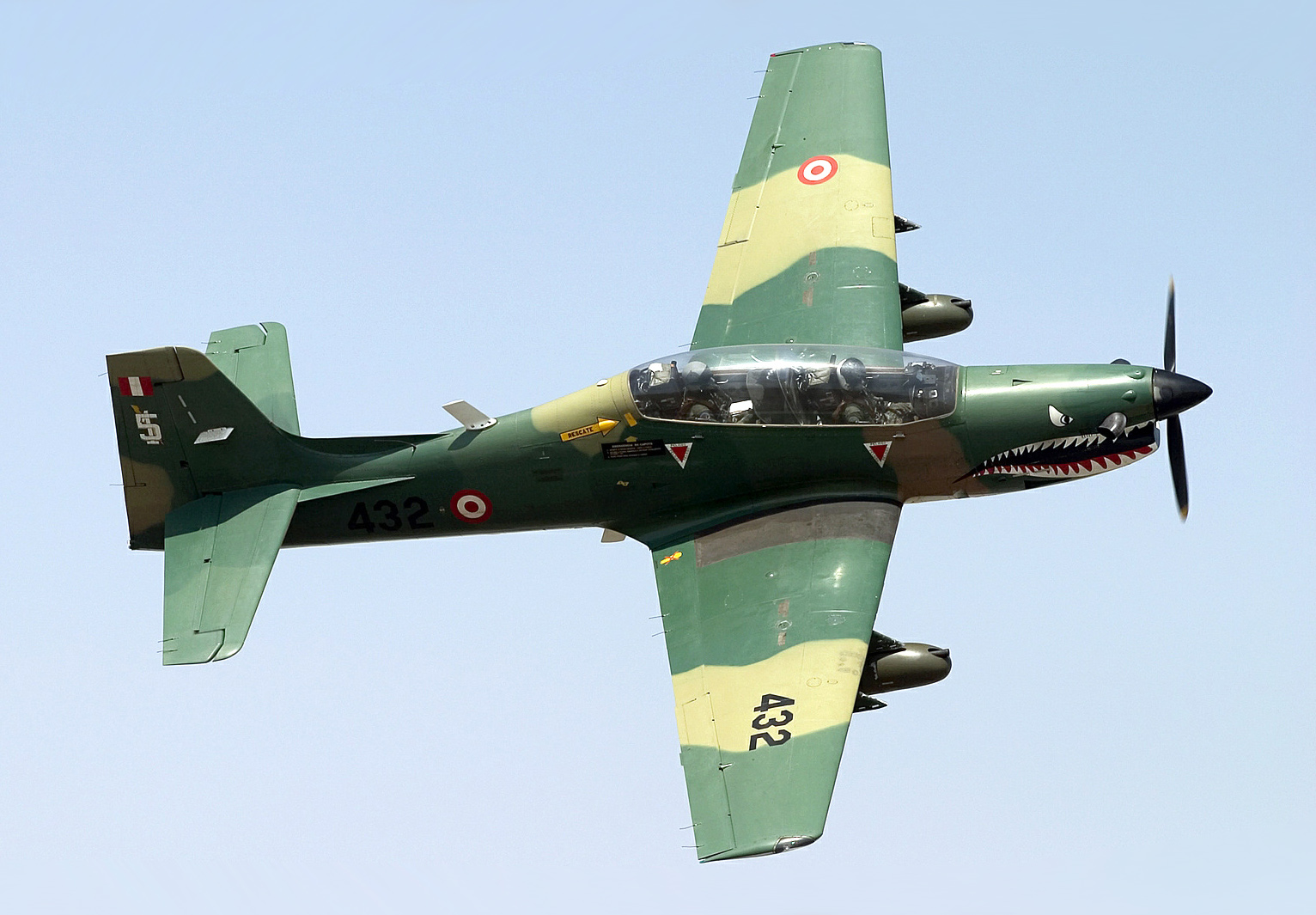
- A Peruvian AT-27

General information
- Type: Trainer and light attack aircraft
- National origin: Brazil
- Manufacturer: Embraer
- Status: In service
- Primary users: Brazilian Air Force Egyptian Air Force; Argentine Air Force; Peruvian Air Force
- Number built: 637

History
- Manufactured: 1980–1996
- Introduction date: September 1983
- First flight: 16 August 1980
- Variant: Short Tucano
- Developed into: Embraer EMB 314 Super Tucano

The Embraer EMB 312 T-27 Tucano (lit. 'Toucan') is a low-wing, tandem-seat, single-turboprop, basic trainer and light attack aircraft produced by Embraer in Brazil. The Brazilian Air Force sponsored the EMB-312 project at the end of 1978. Design and development work began in 1979 on a low-cost, relatively simple, new basic trainer with innovative features which eventually became the international standard for basic training aircraft. The prototype first flew in 1980, and initial production units were delivered in 1983.

Production was initially supported by a local order for 118 aircraft, with options for an additional 50 units in October 1980. It was later matched by an Egyptian licence-produced purchase in 1993 and subsequently by a variant known as the Short Tucano, which was licence-produced in the United Kingdom. The Tucano made inroads into the military trainer arena and became one of Embraer's first international marketing successes. A total of 637 units were produced (477 by Embraer and 160 by Short Brothers), flying in 18 air forces.

== Development ==
=== Background ===
The Brazilian military government considered aircraft strategic equipment, and in an effort to reduce dependency from foreign companies, the state-owned Embraer was established in 1969. A production license to assemble the MB.326 was acquired in 1970 to familiarize the company with military design, and in 1973, the Embraer EMB 110 Bandeirante was introduced with two Pratt & Whitney PT6A engines.

After all-jet training program trials during the 1950s, a variety of propeller-driven aircraft were used for pilot training during the 1960s and 1970s. In the 1970s, oil prices rapidly increased with the price of a crude oil barrel having risen from $3 in 1973 to $36 by 1980, deflating the Brazilian economy. At that time, the Brazilian Air Force operated the J69-powerered Cessna T-37C, which was a 1950s design and following the 1970s energy crisis, became expensive to operate. In 1977, the Brazilian Air Force expressed a desire to replace the T-37, specifying that the replacement would need to be cheap to operate, designed to closely imitate the characteristics of jet aircraft and should have ejection seats.

During the 1970s the Brazilian Air Force operated over 100 piston-powered Neiva Universal basic trainers. Encouraged to undertake a follow-on project known as "Universal II", Indústria Aeronáutica Neiva rolled out the prototype N621A (YT-25A) in 1975 with an extended fuselage, four hard points, and the more powerful 400 hp Lycoming IO-720-A1A engine which drove a three-bladed Hartzell propeller. The YT-25B prototype, a further modified version with six external hard 9points, flew on 22 October 1978, but it did not meet requirements since the type was slower and smaller, and had side-by-side seats and a rear jump seat. Two years later, the company was acquired by Embraer. In 1973, Hungarian-Brazilian designer Joseph Kovács moved from Neiva to Embraer, bringing with him a number of studies based on the Neiva Universal, including a development of the tandem-seat, turboprop Carajá.

=== Responding to requirements ===
In early 1977, Embraer forwarded two proposals for the Brazilian Air Force trainer requirement: the Lycoming TIO-541-powered EMB-301 basic trainer based on the Neiva Universal and the PT6A-powered EMB-311 counter-insurgency aircraft based on the Carajá. None of the proposals was acceptable to the Air Force, but interest was expressed in the higher-performance EMB-311. Later on that same year, the Ministry of Aeronautics (Ministério da Aeronáutica) released a new requirement. Therefore, in January 1978, Embraer's design team, which was led by Guido Fontegalante Pessotti and included Joseph Kovacs, commenced to redesign the EMB-311 to produce the EMB-312.

On 6 December 1978, Embraer was officially awarded a contract to produce two prototypes and two airframes for fatigue tests. The specifications were concluded in February 1979, and the main differences from the EMB-311 were the more powerful PT6A-25C engine, raised rear cockpit, and the addition of ejection seats. Eventually, the original specifications underwent a major modification, including a smaller fuselage with an upright cruciform tail instead of a swept-back tail; a more domed canopy; extended elevators; greater distance between the nosewheel and back wheel; reduction of the wing root; and an increased wingspan, tailplane, and landing gear. By late 1979, a full-scale mock-up was built with a cockpit for the evaluation of flight instruments, and a subscale, radio-controlled research model was designed to evaluate the free-flight characteristics before building a full-scale prototype.

Within 21 months of the contract being signed, the first prototype took flight on 16 August 1980, bearing the FAB serial 1300. The second prototype flew for the first time on 10 December 1980, implementing system accessibility enhancements to trim down maintenance overheads. Weapons captive flight trials resulted in the addition of a fin fillet to improve lateral stability. In August 1982, the second prototype was lost during clearance trials, in which full rudder was applied when the type exceeded the maximum designed diving speed (Vd) of 539 kilometres per hour (291 kn; 335 mph) by 64.7 kilometres per hour (34.9 kn; 40.2 mph), causing the leading edge skin to tear apart, followed by a −30g dive, resulting in a complete disintegration of the airframe. Both the pilot and co-pilot were able to safely eject. The tailplane leading edge of the first prototype was modified, and requirements were cleared in 1983, after which it achieved a maximum diving speed of 607.5 kilometres per hour (328.0 kn; 377.5 mph).

A third prototype YT-27, further modified from the previous two prototypes, received the civilian registration mark PP-ZDK, and flew on 16 August 1982. The following month, the prototype made its international debut at the Farnborough Airshow, crossing the Atlantic just a few days after its maiden flight. The type was designated by the Brazilian Air Force as the T-27 for training purposes and the AT-27 for ground attack in counter-insurgency missions. Inspired by one of the most well-known birds in the Amazon rainforest, a Brazilian Air Force cadet suggested the aircraft be named the "Tucano" (English: toucan), and this was approved on 23 October 1981.

=== Further development ===
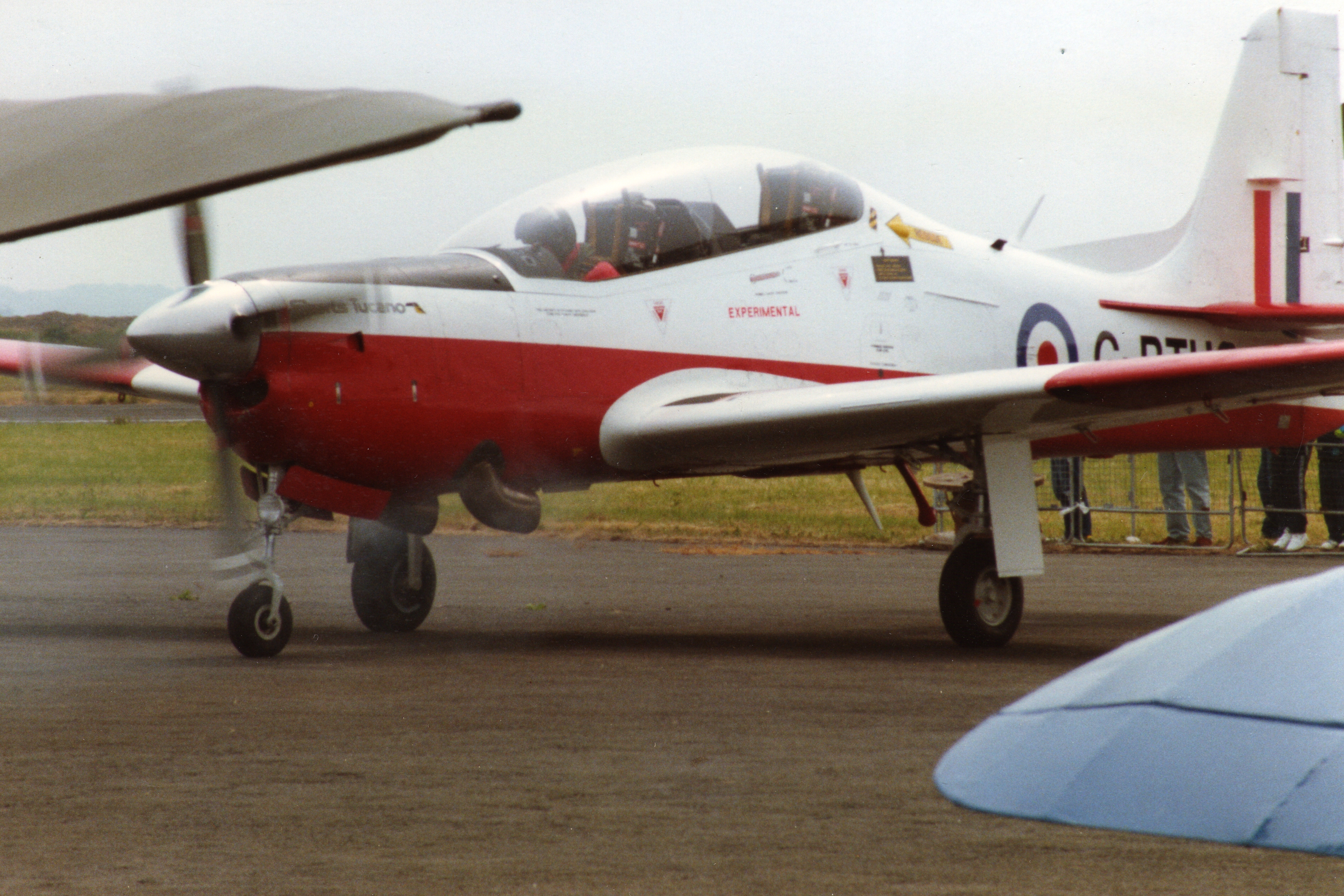
A Short Tucano development aircraft on public display, June 1991

==== EMB-312S ====
An agreement was signed in May 1984 between Embraer and Short Brothers to modify the EMB 312 to meet a Royal Air Force requirement for a high-performance, turbo-prop trainer to replace the BAC Jet Provost issued in 1983. Short Brothers was responsible for the final assembly and licence-built 60% of the aircraft parts, although the wings, landing gear, and canopy were built in Brazil.

In March 1985, after a competition with other types, the Short Tucano was declared the winner, with an order worth £126 million for 130 aircraft and an option for a further 15. As well as production for the Royal Air Force, the Short Tucano was exported to Kenya (12 Tucano Mk.51s) and Kuwait (16 Tucano Mk.52s).

==== EMB-312H ====
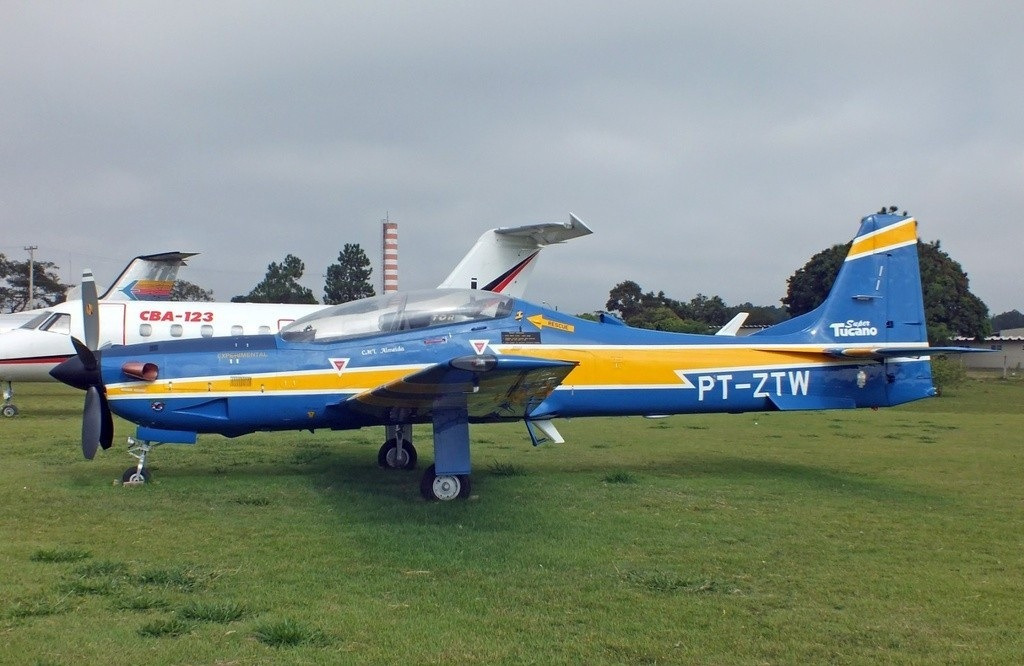
The stretched EMB-312H (s/n 161) had a more powerful engine and was dubbed the "Super Tucano".

During the mid-1980s, as Embraer was working on the Short Tucano, the company also developed a new version designated the EMB-312G1. Also using a Garrett engine, the EMB-312G1 prototype flew for the first time in July 1986. However, the Brazilian Air Force showed no interest, and the project was dropped. Nonetheless, the lessons from recent combat use of the aircraft in Peru and Venezuela led Embraer to continue the studies. It also researched a helicopter attack version designated as the "helicopter killer" or EMB-312H. The study was stimulated by the unsuccessful bid for the Joint Primary Aircraft Training System program, in which Embraer teamed with Northrop Grumman. In 1991, one existing demo EMB-312 aircraft was modified as proof-of-concept prototype. The aircraft featured a 1.37-m (4.49-ft) fuselage extension with the addition of sections fore and aft of the cockpit to restore its centre of gravity and stability, a strengthened airframe, cockpit pressurization, and stretched nose to house the more powerful PT6A-67R (1.424 Shp) engine. The PT-ZTW, s/n 161, flew in September 1991. Two new prototypes EMB-312H with the PT6A-68A (1.250 Shp) engine were built in 1993. The second prototype PT-ZTV, s/n 454 (later PP-ZTV) flew for the first time in May 1993. It featured a reinforced wing skin developed for the model F, an improved glass cockpit, full pressurization system, electrical swing back canopy opening and zero-zero ejections seats. The third prototype PT(PP)-ZTF, s/n 455, flew in October 1993, as a twin of the s/n 454. The EMB-312H's design later served as a starting point for the EMB-314 Super Tucano, dubbed the ALX, and adopted by the Brazilian Air Force as the A-29.

== Design ==
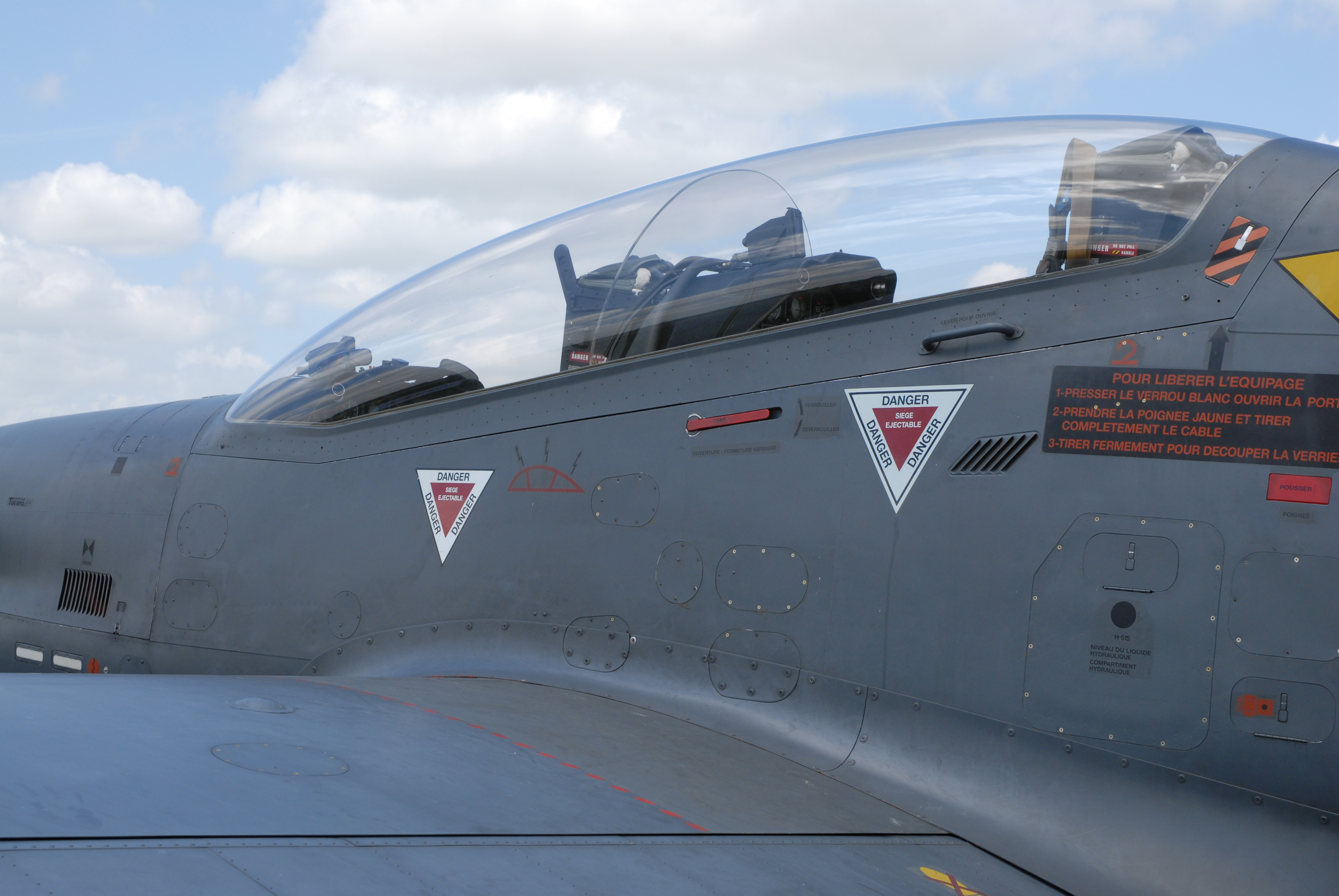
The EMB-312F's frameless canopy features an integral centre windshield to provide rear seat slipstream protection during an emergency.

Many features of the EMB-312 became standard in later basic-training aircraft designs. It was the first turboprop trainer developed from the beginning with military jet capability. A Martin-Baker Mk8L was fitted. It was Embraer's first aircraft with tandem seats designed with a raised rear seat optimized for an uninterrupted view from the rear cockpit and a frameless bubble canopy for unobstructed visibility. Major aircraft features include an automatic torque control system and the jet-like, single-lever throttle which combined both engine power and propeller pitch, assuring smooth and rapid acceleration and deceleration.

The aircraft is fitted with a retractable tricycle undercarriage with steerable nosewheels, allowing a fairly large crab angle during cross-wind landing. The reverse pitch control with which the aircraft is fitted allows the constant-speed mechanism to be manually overridden to reverse the blade pitch angle, thus providing excellent ground-handling characteristics, helping to slow down the plane to shorten the landing run. This control also allows the aircraft to back up on its own during taxiing.

High manoeuvrability, stability at low speeds, and four underwing pylons providing for up to 1,000 kg (2,200 lb) of ordnance, allow the training aircraft to engage in tactical bombing campaigns in low-intensity conflict or counterinsurgency environments and in counternarcotics interceptions. The type can carry up to 694 litres (183 US gal) of fuel internally; additionally, two fuel tanks of 660 litres (170 US gal) can be fitted to underwing weapon stations for extended endurance, enabling up to nine flight hours.

== Operational history ==
=== Angola ===
The National Air Force of Angola (Força Aérea Nacional Angolana, FANA) received eight new AT-27s in 1998. Six more AT-27s were purchased four years later from the Peruvian Air Force. The AT-27s were assigned to carry out air strikes and surveillance missions during the Angolan Civil War. Two further stored EMB-312 demonstrators (s/n 055 and s/n149) were delivered to cover aircraft losses during the war.

=== Argentina ===
In June 1987, the Argentine Air Force received the first batch of 15 aircraft from a total of 30 aircraft on order, and the type was assigned to replace the Morane-Saulnier MS.760 Paris. Based at the Military Aviation School in Cordoba, the Tucanos were used as trainer aircraft for the Joint Basic Course of Military Aviation program, producing pilots for the Argentine Air Force, Navy, and Army. In the first 25 years of its service with the Argentine Air Force, the aircraft accumulated 104,000 flight hours and trained over 800 pilots. FAdeA is developing the IA-73, a primary trainer to replace EMB-312 Tucano. The type aircraft will be relocated to the northern Argentina, where they will be armed and used for air interdiction and surveillance role.

=== Brazil ===
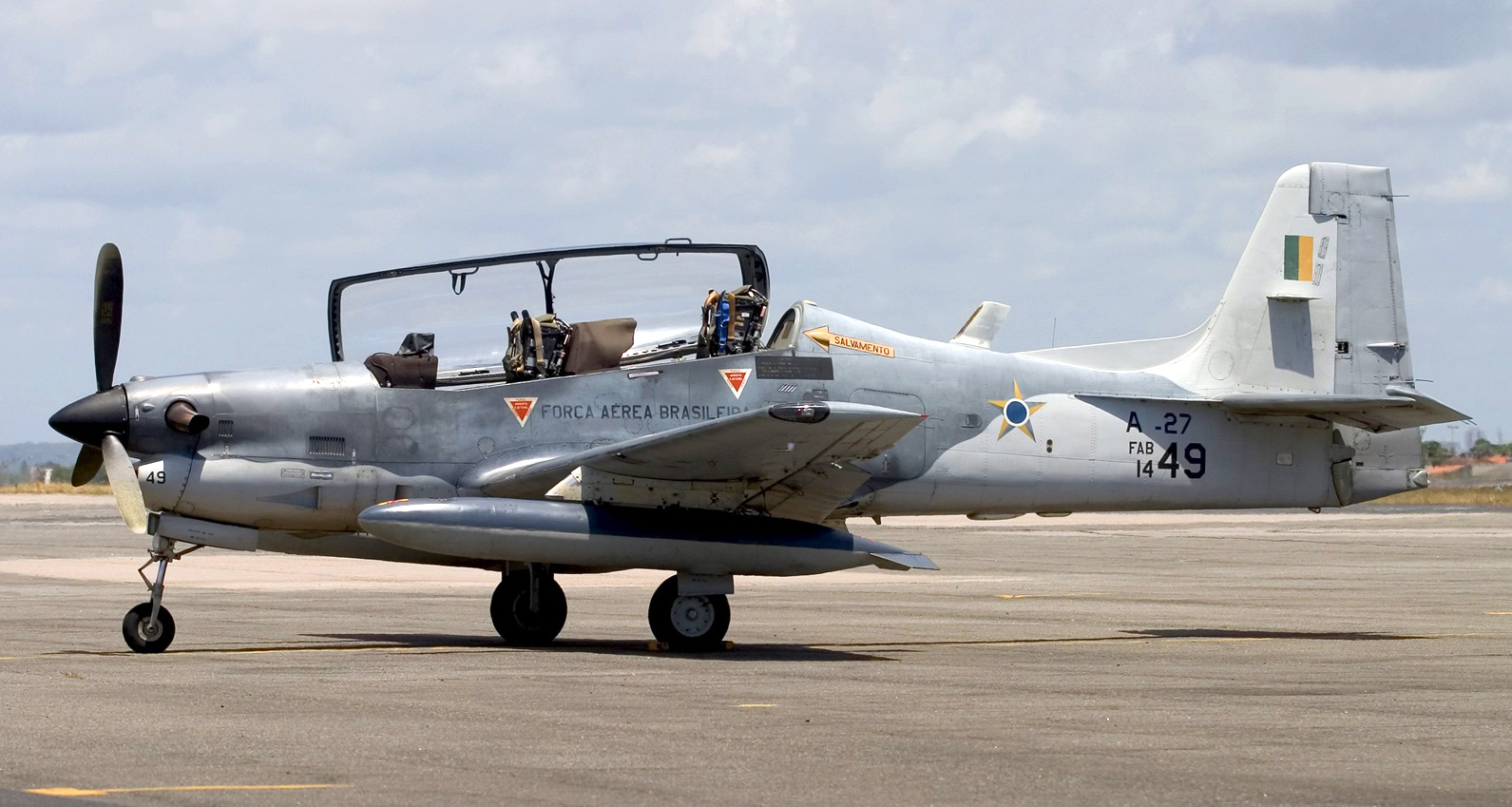
Brazilian Air Force T-27

A total of 118 T-27s were purchased by the Brazilian Air Force (FAB) with an option for a further 50 aircraft. On 29 September 1983, the first units were delivered as an aerobatic demonstration aircraft for the FAB Demonstration Squadron, the "Smoke Squadron" (Esquadrilha da Fumaça), and the first demonstration took place in December the same year. In 1990, the FAB confirmed an order of 10 units from the 50 options held from the original Tucano contract in 1980. Eventually, the FAB received the remaining 40 aircraft, raising the total number of delivered units to 168.

As part of the FAB's four-year pilot-training program at the Academia da Força Aérea (AFA), the EMB-312 is flown on the last year as an advanced training vector. After flying 75 hours on the Neiva Universal basic training aircraft, the student pilots progress to fly 125 hours of advanced training on the Tucano, in which cadets learn to dominate the airplane with acrobatics, precision manoeuvring, instrumental flight, and fly-pasts. Brazilian Naval Aviation cadets are required to fly 100 hours on the Tucano at the AFA during the first stage of the three-year training program. According to a Brazilian Air Force brigadier, the AFA Tucanos are forecast to be withdrawn in 2022.

During Operation Traira in February 1991, six Tucanos were used for close air support against a group of 40 rebels from the Revolutionary Armed Forces of Colombia (FARC), which had seized a Brazilian military detachment. AT–27s were extensively used in the Amazon for border patrols and interception of illicit flights, jointly operating with SIVAM (Amazon Surveillance System).

=== Colombia ===
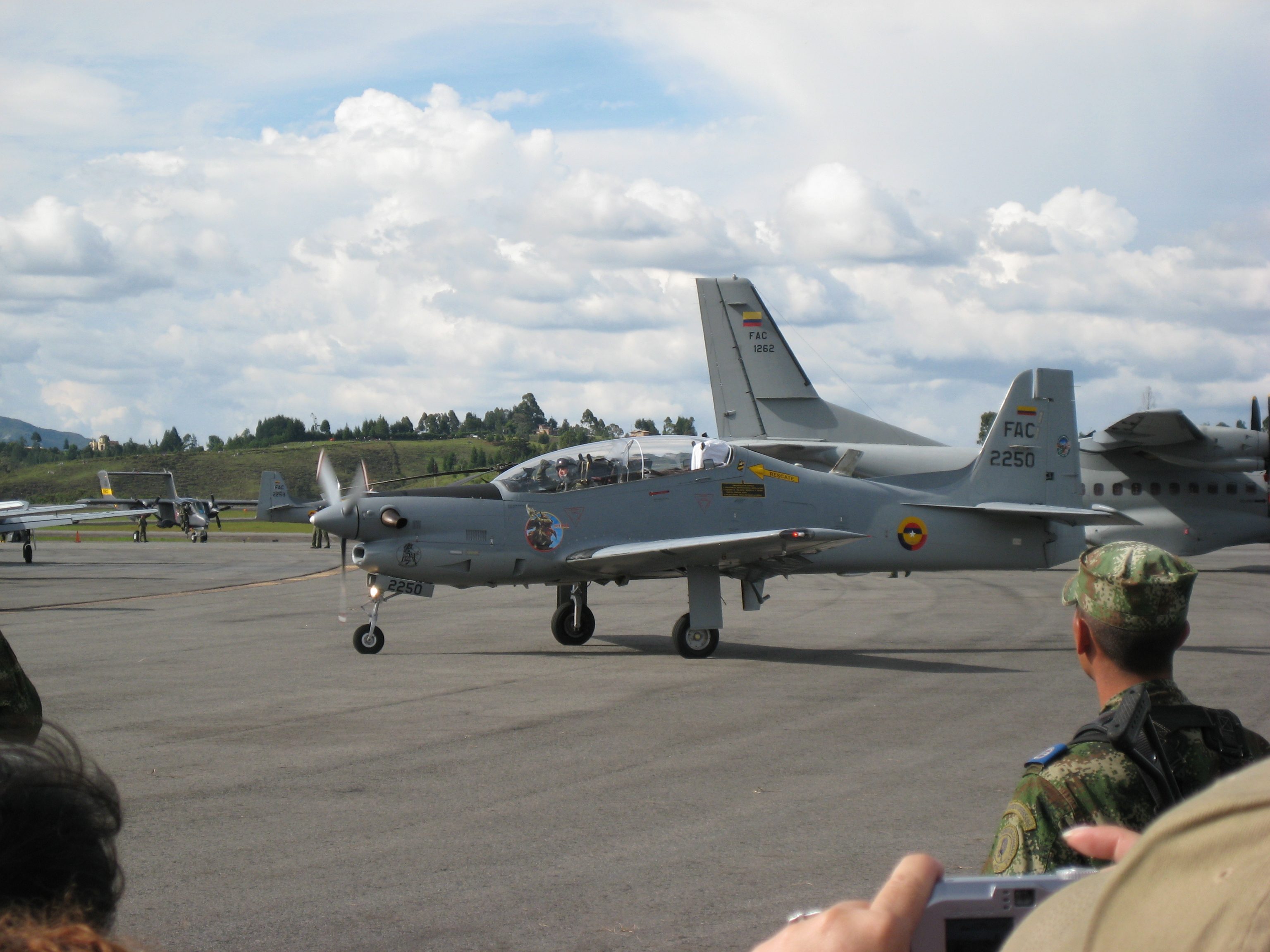
Colombian Tucano

Fourteen AT-27s were ordered in 1992, and delivery of the first six units took place in December of the same year, followed by seven more units arriving later that same month. Assigned to the Combat 212 Squadron, the aircraft were initially conceived as trainers, although the type was soon additionally assigned to perform close air support and air superiority missions as part of counter-insurgency operations during the long-standing fight with the FARC. The type performed dozens of operations including Vuelo de Angel, Thanatos, Fenix and Júpiter. Over 50,000 flight hours have been completed since the type's introduction without a single loss.

In 1998, with Peruvian Air Force assistance, night vision goggles were integrated into the aircraft to perform night missions. The war scenario led the Air Force to push the type beyond its designed horizon to overcome its operational limits and role-playing as a real battlefield maturing test platform, providing valuable lessons which unfolded into new requirements that were implemented in the Super Tucano design.

In 2011, Embraer began a three-year program to locally uprate 14 EMB-312s. A part of the Strategic Development Plan (Plan Estratégico Institucional, or PEI) 2011–2030 designed to extend the type's lifespan by 15 years, the structural retrofit program involves fitting the airframe with new wings and landing gear. Fresh avionics will be installed with the up-to-date Rockwell Collins Inertial Navigation System and ACARS), while Cobham will supply modern multi-function displays, flight management systems and the engine-indicating and crew-alerting system. The first prototype will be designed and produced by Embraer in Brazil, while remaining work will be completed at the Corporation of the Colombian Aeronautic Industry SA (Corporación de la Industria Aeronáutica Colombiana S.A.)

=== Egypt ===
In December 1983, a US$181 million contract was signed for 10 complete aircraft plus a further 110 aircraft in kit form. The joint Egyptian/Iraqi purchase involved an extensive technology transfer program which included the manufacturing of some aircraft parts and final assembly at Heliopolis Air Works in Helwan, becoming Embraer's first experience in assembling aircraft abroad. Eighty of the 110 units built in Egypt were delivered to Iraq. The first aircraft arrived in late 1984 and the first unit assembled in Egypt was delivered in 1985. An additional order for 14 aircraft was made in 1989, bringing the total to 54 Tucanos. The EMB312 Tucano trainers were flown with 6 squadron, 25 squadron and 35 squadron. No. 6 Squadron retired their Tucanos and transformed to the E-June UAV at Kom Awshim. In 2023 the Tucanos still operate from Inshas (25 Sqn), Ismaïla (25 Sqn) and Hurghada (35 Sqn) for pilot training at the AT-802 Air Tractor.

=== France ===
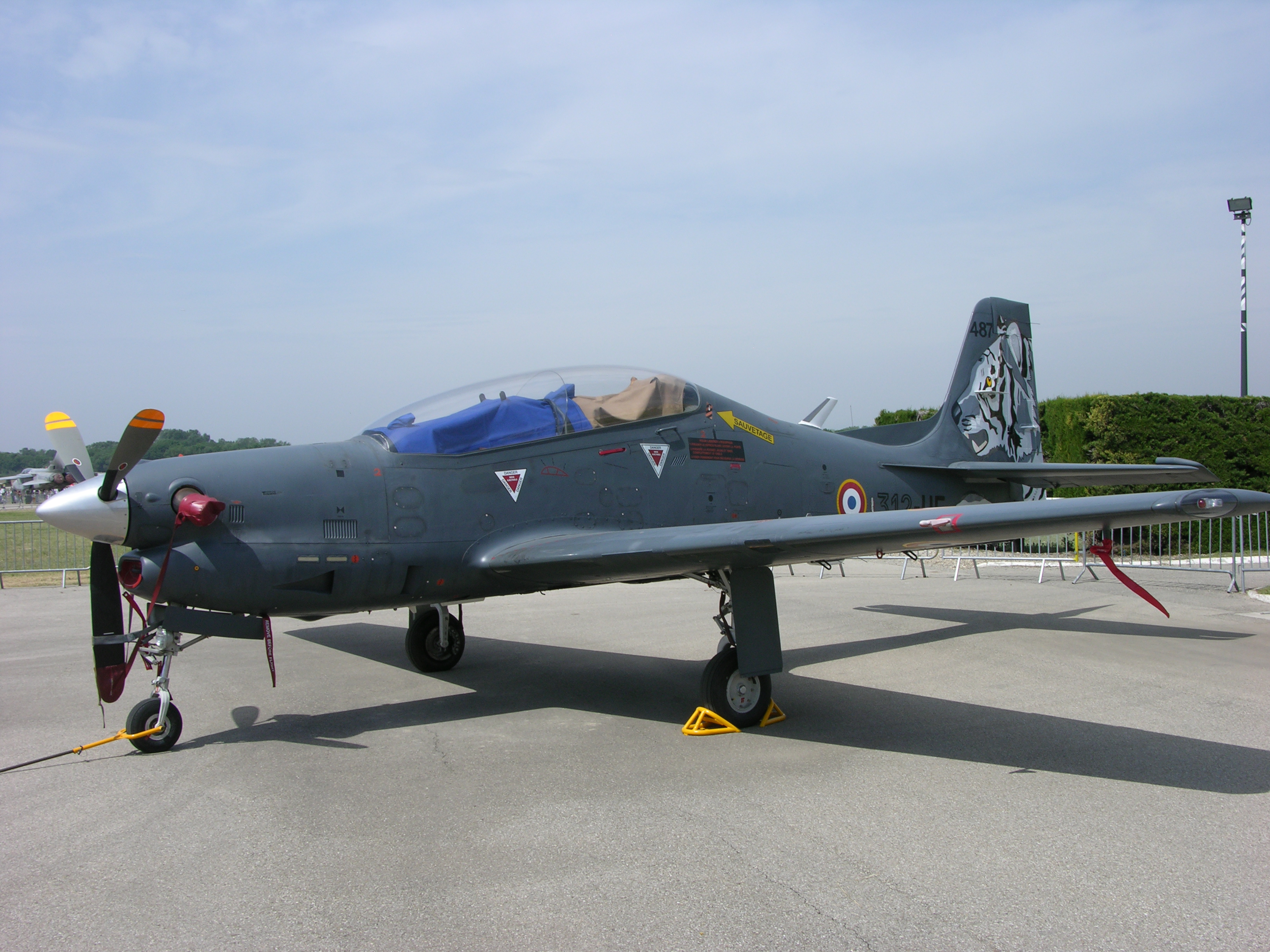
French Air Force EMB-312 Tucano

Following a world trend towards the replacement of jet trainers with lower-cost, turboprop trainers, in July 1990 the French Air Force initially ordered 80 slightly modified variants, designated as the EMB-312F. The two-year-long negotiation deal was an offset for 36 AS365s and 16 AS350s bought by the Brazilian Army and 30 AS355 Ecureuils for the Brazilian Navy. Two preproduction aircraft were built for a year-long evaluation process at the General Directorate for Armament, the first preproduction EMB-312F flew in April 1993. The model had a ventral airbrake and a French COMM system. The total number of aircraft ordered was reduced to 50, with commissioning of the first production model taking place in 1995. The aircraft were based in Salon-de-Provence, replacing the Fouga Magister which had provided training for Air Force students for nearly 40 years. Following the type's introduction, the Air Force training scheme began with the Epsilon, continued on the Tucano and culminated with the Alpha Jet for lead-in fighter training. After 15 years in service, the French Tucano fleet was withdrawn on 22 July 2009, despite the fact that most aircraft had only reached half of their potential operational life.

=== Honduras ===
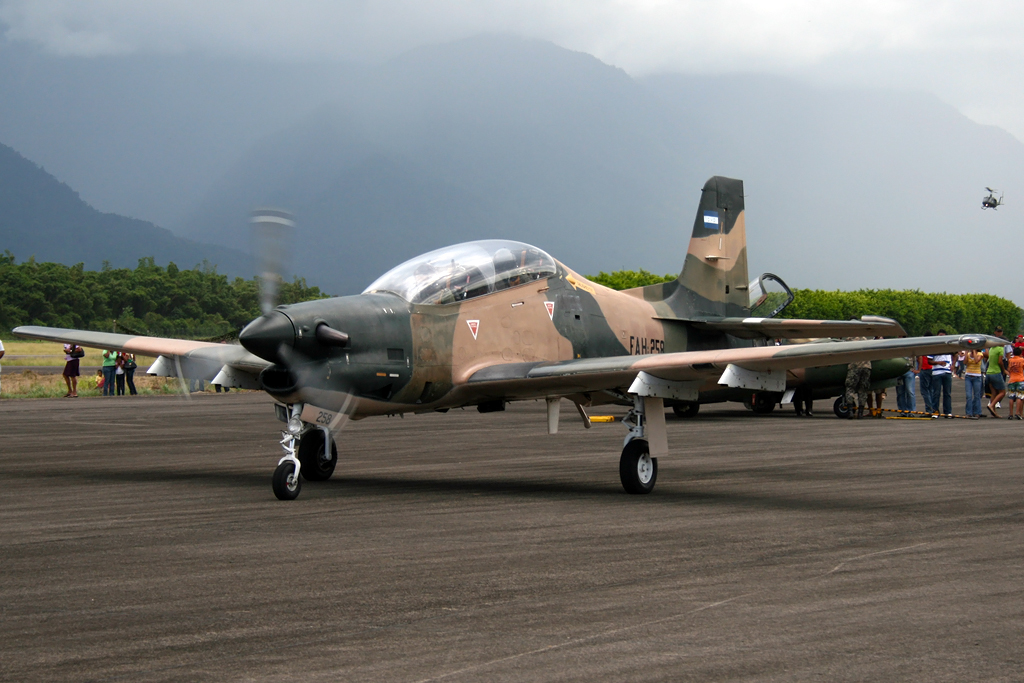
Honduran AT-27 at Hector C. Moncada Air Base

Honduras, the Tucano's first foreign customer, purchased the type to replace the North American T-28 Trojan. Twelve EMB-312s were received between 1982 and 1983. The aircraft are used for both advanced training and patrolling Honduran airspace for illegal flights.

On 14 April 2003, the type was used to shoot down an Aero Commander 500 with 7.62 mm (0.30 in) machine gun pods. The two Colombian occupants died during the crash, while 942 kilograms (2,077 lb) of cocaine were collected from the wreckage. In August 2010, a Piper Seneca aircraft coming from Colombia was tracked down by an AT-27. Five criminals were arrested and 550 kilograms (1,210 lb) of cocaine were seized. Three months later, a Tucano was used to intercept an aircraft with 550 kilograms (1,210 lb) of cocaine.

In February 2012, the military of Honduras and Embraer began a study of the aging AT-27 cells for a possible reconditioning program. Later on that month, the Honduras defence minister disclosed that the reconditioning of six aircraft would cost US$10 million. In May of the same year, a Tucano intercepted an aircraft from which 400 kilograms (880 lb) of cocaine were seized. In the following month, a Honduran Tucano shot down a drug-smuggling, twin-engined prop Cessna over the Bay Islands, killing the two occupants, including an undercover DEA agent. Honduran law does not permit shooting down illegal flights, so the event led to the dismissal of the Honduran general who ordered the attack.

=== Iran ===
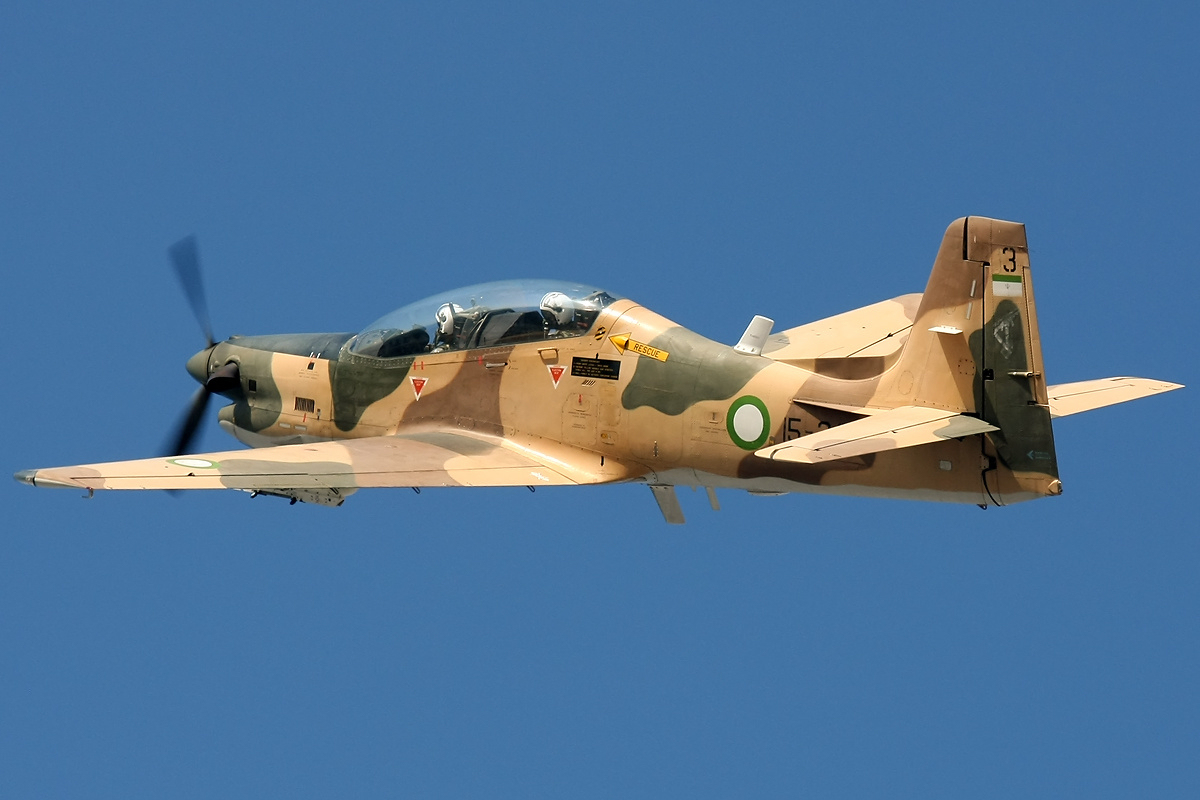
Iranian Revolutionary Guard Air Force Embraer EMB-312 Tucano at the 2014 Kish Air Show

Iran received 25 aircraft between 1989 and 1991. Between 2000 and 2001, the IRGC used Tucanos against Taliban positions and in drug-busting operations in the eastern Iranian borders.

=== Iraq ===
Iraq bought 80 aircraft produced under license by Helwan, with deliveries being completed in 1987. Following the end of the Gulf and Iraq wars, Iraq had no EMB-312 in its inventory.

=== Mauritania ===
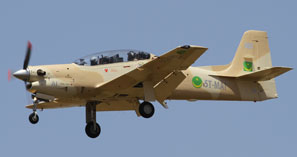
Mauritanian EMB-312F

In 2011, the Islamic Air Force of Mauritania received pilot training from the French Air Force and four ex-French EMB-312Fs, which still had two-thirds of their structural life, were delivered. The aircraft underwent a complete overhaul before being delivered, receiving wing hard points for gun pods and new radios. The type is based at Atar in the northwest of the country, where they are used in attack missions against Al-Qaeda Organization in the Islamic Maghreb (AQIM) guerrillas. In March 2012, Mauritanian EMB-312Fs intruded into Mali air space while attacking AQIM terrorist targets inside Mali; the two countries are cooperating in military action against these terrorists.

=== Paraguay ===
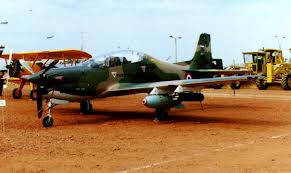
Paraguayan AT-27

Paraguay received six aircraft in 1987. Six more were purchased in the late 1990s, but the deal fell through, and these machines ended up being the second batch sold to Angola. On 29 December 2010, three used ex-Brazilian aircraft were exchanged for four EMB-326GB (Xavante) trainer aircraft and one Boeing-707 transport aircraft. In 2011, the Paraguayan Tucanos with assistance from the Brazilian Air Force, went through a complete engine overhaul.

The 3o Escuadrón de caza "Moros" in Asunción operates the Tucanos in counter-insurgency missions, forming the squads "Gamma" and "Omega" since 1996. In April 2011, Paraguayan Tucano fitted with 20 mm autocannon gun pods and ferry tanks were deployed at Mariscal Estigarribia Air Base to monitor illicit flights entering Paraguayan airspace from Bolivia.

=== Peru ===
In 1986, Peru ordered 20 Tucanos to replace the Cessna T-37 Tweet. Deliveries to the Peruvian Air Force commenced in April 1987 at the rate of two units per month; the last delivery took place in November 1987. In 1991, an additional 10 Tucanos were purchased for antidrug operations, reaching a total of 30 aircraft, although six of them were resold to Angola in 2002. The first EMB-312s took part in the Escuadrón de Instrucción básica No. 512 from the Air Academy as part of the Grupo de Entrenamiento 51 based at Las Palmas – Lima. Another squadron of EMB-312s was assigned to Escuadrón Aéreo Táctico No. 514. The first aircraft were painted in orange and white for trainers and gradually replaced by jungle camouflage, while a few were painted dark gray for night missions. Most of these aircraft were adorned with an aggressive shark's mouth. The aircraft cockpit was later modified to suit night-vision goggles and forward-looking infrared sensors for night operations. Since 1991, the FAP Tucanos were actively involved in ground attack operations over the Cenepa River on drug-busting operations, shooting down over 65 planes and performing attacks on several illicit ships. Between 1992 and 2001, the Air Bridge Denial Program provided intelligence for the Air Force in counter-drug operations; during the program, at least nine civilian aircraft were shot down by AT-27s. During the Cenepa War, loaded with four Mk.82 bombs and equipped with night-vision goggles, a fleet of Tucanos carried out a night bomber raid targeting Ecuadorian forces over the Cordillera del Cóndor at dawn on 5 February 1995.

The aircraft were part of the 2002 Quiñones Plan, which was implemented in 2007 and aimed at putting unserviceable equipment back into service. In March 2012, the Peruvian Air Force was considering an option to modernize 20 EMB-312s in a program jointly conducted by the Brazilian Air Force and Embraer under a wide-ranging defence agreement signed with the Brazilian defence ministry.

=== Venezuela ===
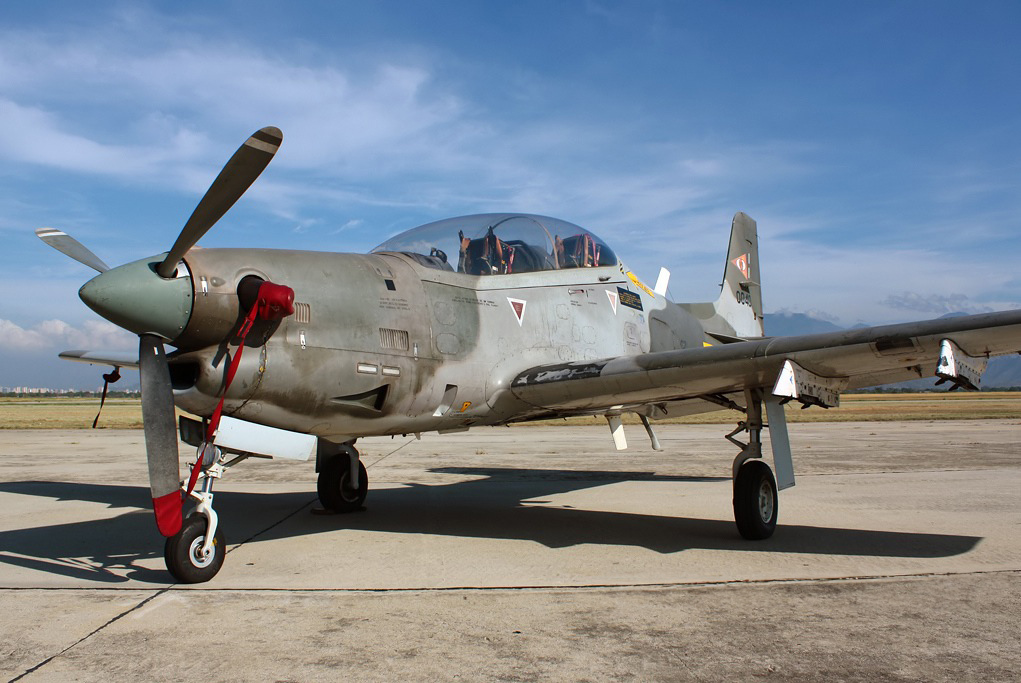
Venezuelan Air Force AT-27

On 14 July 1986, the Venezuelan Air Force received the first four Embraer EMB-312 Tucano AT/T-27s from an order of 30 aircraft that was worth US$50 million. A year later, the remaining aircraft were delivered, divided into two variants: 18 T-27s for training purposes and 12 AT-27s for tactical support. The Tucanos were assigned to Grupo 14 at the Escuadrón de Entrenamiento No. 142 "Escorpiones" based in Maracay, to the Grupo 13 at the Escuadrón de Operaciones Especiales No. 131 "Zorros" based in Barcelona, and Grupo de Operaciones Especiales No. 15 at the Escuadrón No.152 "Avispones" based in Maracaibo. The AT-27s, along with the OV-10 Broncos, were actively involved in many antiguerrilla, antinarcotic, and antikidnapping campaigns close to the Colombian borders.

On 27 November 1992, the aircraft were used by mutineering officers who staged a coup d'état against President Carlos Andrés Pérez. The rebels dropped bombs and launched rockets against police and government buildings in Caracas. One EMB-312 and two OV-10 Broncos were shot down during the uprising by F-16s flown by loyalist pilots. A lot of 12 is scheduled to be refurbished in Venezuela as of 2013.

== Variants ==
=== EMB-312A ===
The standard production model with fatigue life of 8,000 hours:

- Tucano YT-27
  Pre-series prototypes
- Tucano T-27
  Two-seat basic-training variant
- Tucano AT-27
  Two-seat light-attack variant

=== EMB-312F ===
An uprated version built for the French Air Force, the EMB-312F is equipped with Telecommunications Electronique Aeronautique et Maritime (TEAM SA, part of Cobham plc) avionics, Thomson-CSF (now Thales Group) navigation aids, increased fatigue life, propeller and canopy de-icing system and a ventral airbrake. The first EMB-312F flew on 7 April 1993.

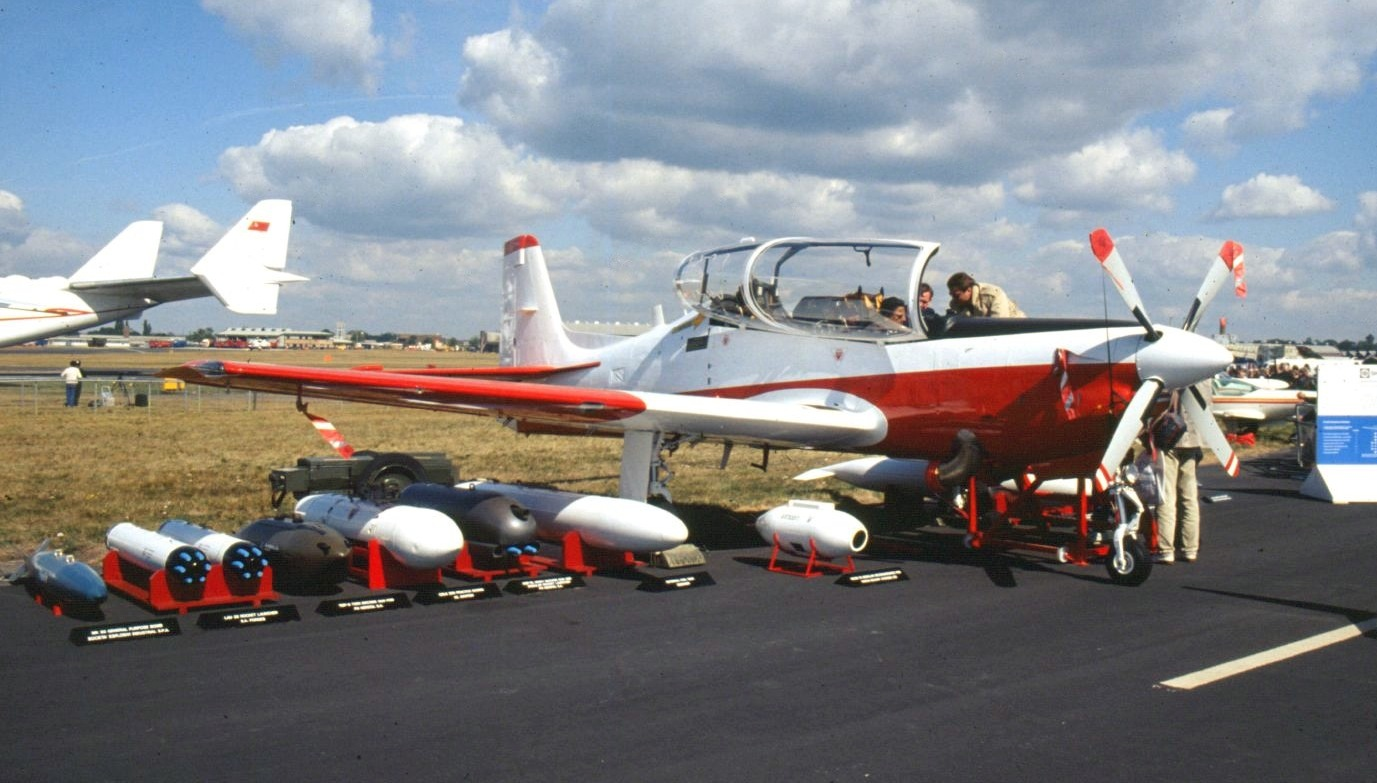
Tucano Mk.51 (ZH209) on display at Farnborough Airshow in September 1990.

=== EMB-312S ===
Also known as the Short Tucano, the EMB-312S is an uprated, licence-produced trainer version built at Short Brothers of Belfast in Northern Ireland for the Royal Air Force and licensed for export. The type features a more powerful Honeywell 820 kW (1,100 shp) Garrett TPE331-12B engine with four-blade, variable-pitch propeller, custom avionics, structural strengthening expanding fatigue life to 12,000hr, two-piece canopy for better bird strike proofing, pressurized cabin, a ventral airbrake, aerodynamic changes to the wing, better wheel brakes, and an optional armament capability.

- Tucano T.1
  Original version of the Short Tucano used by the RAF.
- Tucano Mk.51
  Export variant for Kenya Air Force.
- Tucano Mk.52
  Export variant for Kuwait Air Force.

=== EMB-312G1 ===
A prototype built in 1986 with Garrett engine

=== EMB-312H ===
A Northrop/Embraer developed prototype for USAF (JPATS) competition for an advanced trainer, from which derived the EMB-314 Super Tucano (ALX) now in production for FAB.

== Operators ==
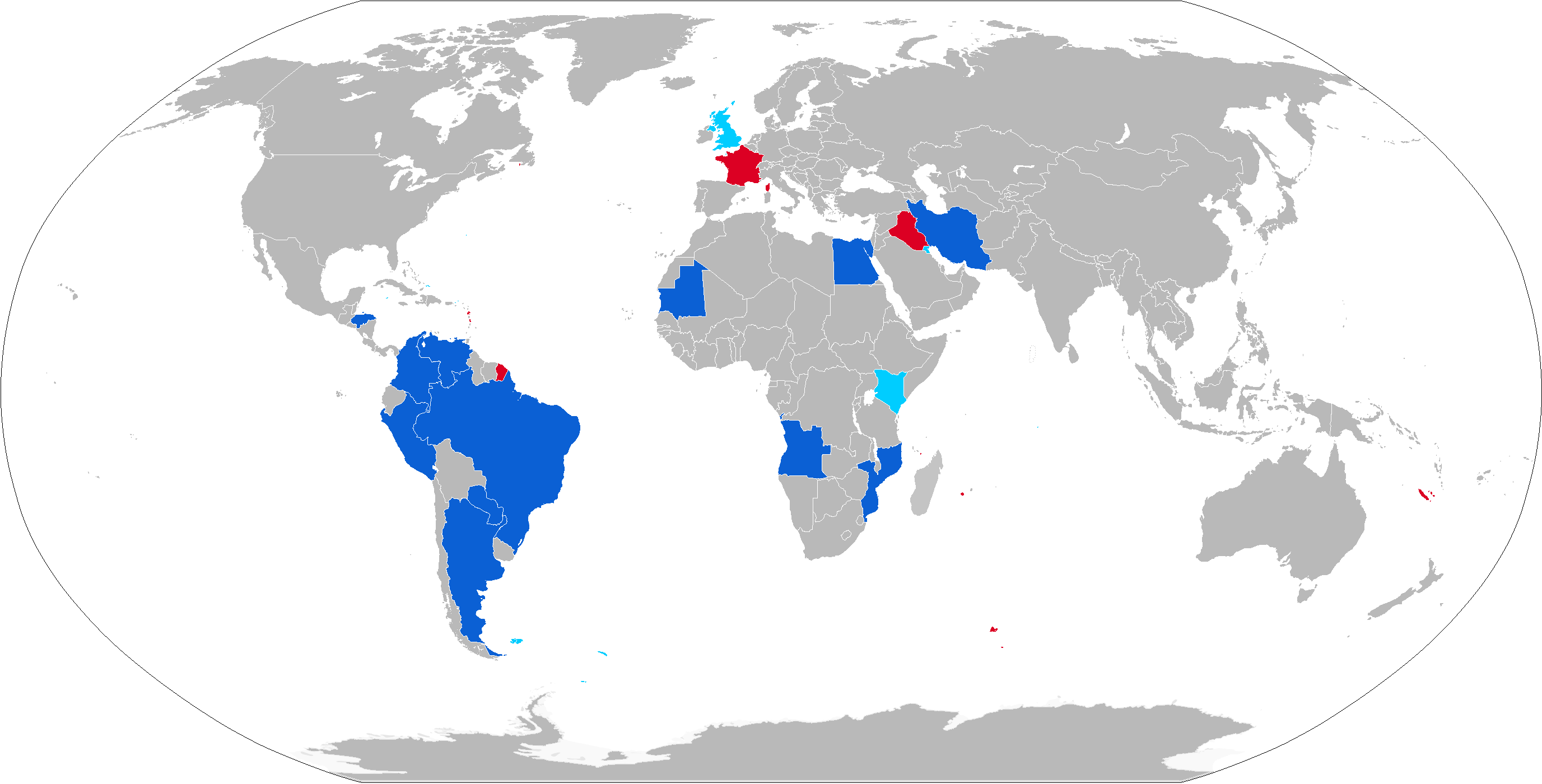
Map with EMB 312 operators in blue, Short Tucano operators in light blue and former operators in red

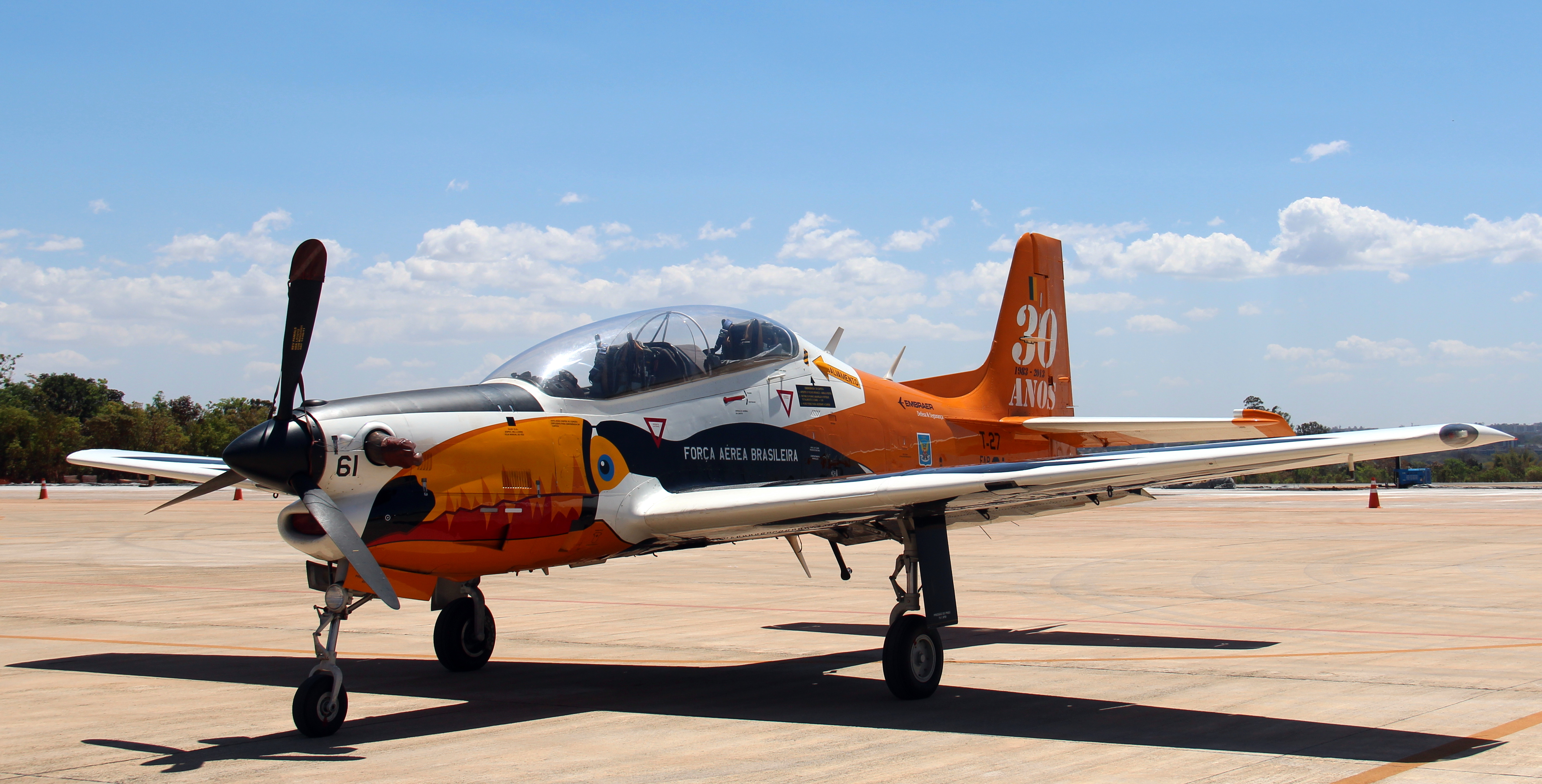
A Brazilian Air Force Academy Tucano received a special painting to celebrate 30 years of service within the Brazilian Air Force.

Angola

- National Air Force of Angola – 13 EMB-312

Argentina

- Argentine Air Force – 14 EMB-312
  - Escuela de Aviación Militar (EAM) at Cordoba.

Brazil

- Brazilian Air Force – 102 EMB-312
  - Smoke Squadron (EDA)
  - Brazilian Air Force Academy (Academia da Força Aérea) (AFA)
  - First Squadron of the Fourteenth Aviation Group (1º/14º GAv) Esquadrão "Pampa" at Canoas
  - Second Squadron of the Fourteenth Aviation Group (2º/14º GAv) at Canoas
  - First Squadron of the First Aviation Group (1°/1° GAv) Esquadrão "Jambock" at Santa Cruz
  - Second Squadron of the First Aviation Group (2°/1° GAv) Esquadrão "Pif-Faf" at Santa Cruz
  - Third Squadron of the Third Aviation Group (3º/3º GAV) Esquadrão "Flecha" at Campo Grande
  - Seventh Regional Air Command HQ Flight at Boa Vista
  - Seventh Regional Air Command HQ Flight at Porto Velho
  - Fifth Regional Air Command HQ Flight at Natal

Central African Republic

- Central African Republic Air Force – 2 EMB-312

Colombia

- Colombian Aerospace Force – 14 EMB-312
  - Escuadrón de Combate 212 at Apiay

Egypt

- Egyptian Air Force – 54 EMB-312
  - 102 Tactical Air Wing at Ismailia/Hurghada
    - 6 Squadron (Bilbeis, wfu) --> E-June UAV (Kom Awshim)
    - 25 Squadron (Inshas and Ismaila)
    - 35 Squadron (Hurghada)

Honduras

- Honduran Air Force – 8 EMB-312, 2 in service 6 in storage .
  - Escuela de Aviacion Militar (EAM)

Iran

- IRGC Air Force – 15 EMB-312

Kuwait

- Kuwait Air Force – 12 Tucano T52 (see Short Tucano).

Kenya

- Kenya Air Force – 12 Tucano T51 (see Short Tucano).

Mauritania

- Mauritanian Air Force – 5 EMB-312F
  - Ecole Militaire Inter Armes (EMIA) at Atar

Mozambique

- Mozambique Air Force – 3 EMB-312 donated by Brazil

Paraguay

- Paraguayan Air Force – 6 EMB-312.
  - 3 Escuadrón de Roconocimento y Ataque "Moros"
    - Escuadrilla Gama
    - Escuadrilla Omega

Peru

- Peruvian Air Force – 17 EMB-312.
  - Escuadrón Aereo de Instrución 512
  - Escuadrón Aereo de Instrución 514

Venezuela

- Venezuelan Air Force – 19 EMB-312
  - Escuadrón 131
  - Escuadrón 141
  - Escuadrón 142
  - Escuadrón 152

=== Former operators ===
France

- French Air Force : 50 EMB-312F from 1995 to 2009, 20 in 2007.
  - Flying School at Salon-de-Provence Air Base
- Centre d'essais en vol
- Centre d'Études et d'Armement de Mulhouse

Iraq

- Iraqi Air Force : 80 EMB-312 delivered between 1985 and 1988

United Kingdom

- Royal Air Force – 130 Tucano T1 (see Short Tucano).

== Aircraft on display ==
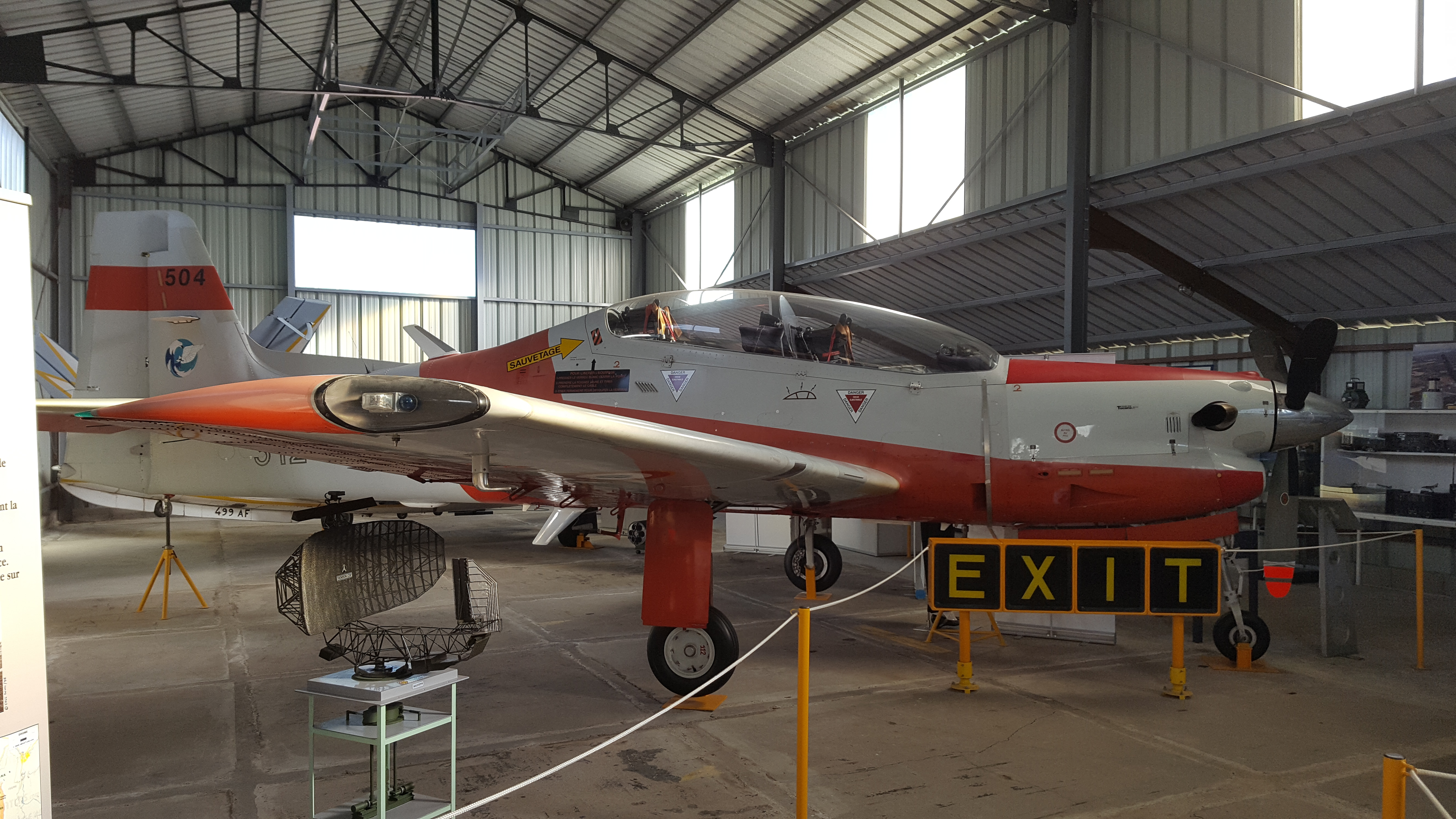
French AF, EMB-312F MSN 312499, at the Musée Européen de l'Aviation de Chasse d'Ancône (France)

The Embraer EMB 312F MSN 312496, a former aircraft of the Armée de l'Air is on display in Musée de l'air et de l'espace from 2014 in a typical French livery.

The Embraer EMB 312F MSN 312499, is on display at the Musée Européen de l'Aviation de Chasse d'Ancône.

Short/Embraer EMB 312S prototype MSN 312007 G-BTUC (ex PP-ZTC) is on display at Ulster Aviation Society museum, Maze Long Kesh, Lisburn, Northern Ireland

== Specifications (standard EMB 312) ==
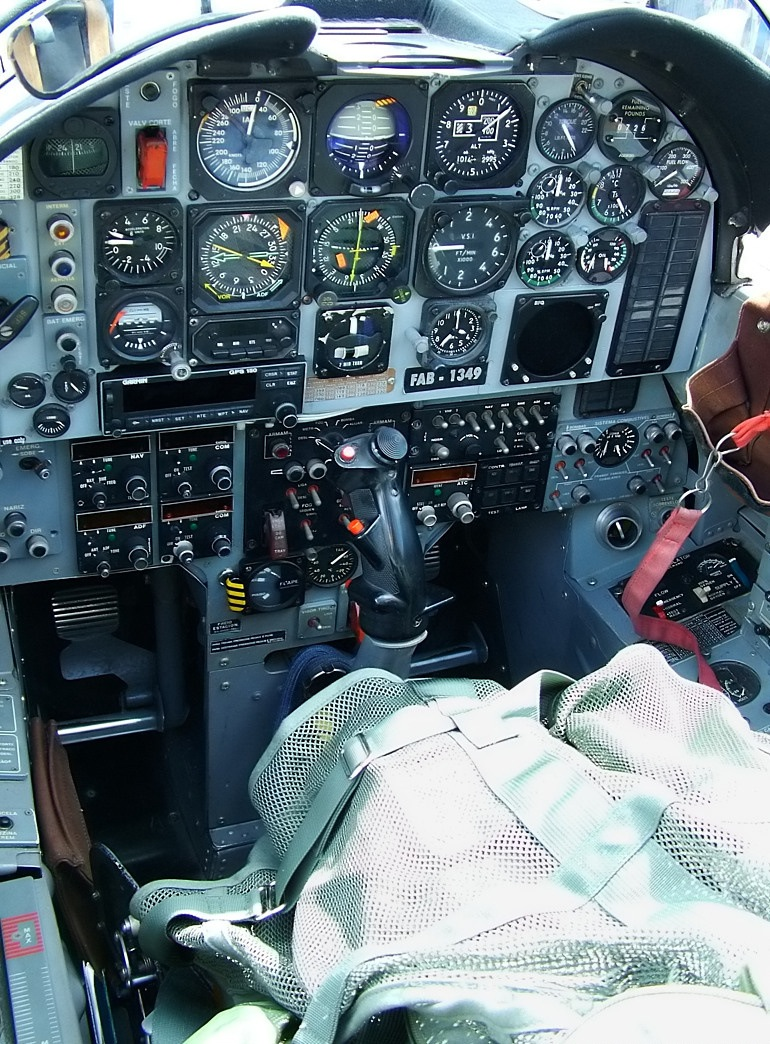
Brazilian Air Force EMB-312 Cockpit

Data from Air International, Vol. 26, Issue 6, and armament data from Air International, Vol. 24, Issue 1.

General characteristics

- Crew: 2
- Length: 9.86 m (32 ft 4 in)
- Wingspan: 11.14 m (36 ft 7 in)
- Height: 3.4 m (11 ft 2 in)
- Wing area: 19.4 m^{2} (209 sq ft)
- Airfoil: root: NACA 63A415; tip: NACA 63A212
- Empty weight: 1,810 kg (3,990 lb)
- Max takeoff weight: 3,175 kg (7,000 lb)
- Fuel capacity: 694 litres (183 US gal; 153 imp gal)
- Powerplant: 1 × Pratt & Whitney Canada PT6A-25C turboprop engine, 552 kW (740 hp)
- Propellers: 4-bladed constant-speed propeller

Performance

- Maximum speed: 458 km/h (285 mph, 247 kn) at 4,115 metres (13,500 ft)
- Cruise speed: 441 km/h (274 mph, 238 kn)
- Stall speed: 124 km/h (77 mph, 67 kn)
- Never exceed speed: 539 km/h (335 mph, 291 kn)
- Range: 1,916 km (1,191 mi, 1,035 nmi)
- Service ceiling: 8,750 m (28,700 ft)
- g limits: +6 /-3
- Wing loading: 164 kg/m^{2} (34 lb/sq ft)

Armament

- Guns: ** Gun pods:
    - AN/M-B machine gun
    - 12,7 mm machine gun
    - 7,62 mm machine gun (500 rounds)
  - Rocket Machine Gun pod:
    - RMP LC with a 12.7mm M3P and (4x) 70 mm
- Hardpoints: 4 under-wing pylons with a capacity of 1,000 kg (2,200 lb)
- Rockets: ** 127 mm HVAR ground rockets
  - Rocket pods:
    - SBAT (7x) 37 mm
    - SBAT (7x) 70 mm
- Bombs: ** General-purpose bomb:
    - Mk 81
    - Mk 82
  - Practice bomb:
    - MK 76 (20 lb)
- Others:
  - Ferry tanks: 2x 660 litres (170 US gal) or 330 litres (87 US gal)

== See also ==
- Flying Legend Tucano Replica

Related development

- Short Tucano, a UK licensed version used by the RAF and others
- Embraer EMB 314 Super Tucano

Aircraft of comparable role, configuration, and era

- KAI KT-1
- TAI Hürkuş
- Pilatus PC-7
- Pilatus PC-9
- Fuji T-7
- Utva Lasta
- PZL-130 Orlik
- T-6 Texan II

Related lists

- List of aircraft of the Argentine Air Force
- List of active Brazilian military aircraft
- List of aircraft of the Egyptian Air Force
- List of aircraft of the Iranian Air Force
- List of active United Kingdom military aircraft
