= Neiva Universal =

Military training aircraft

Universal
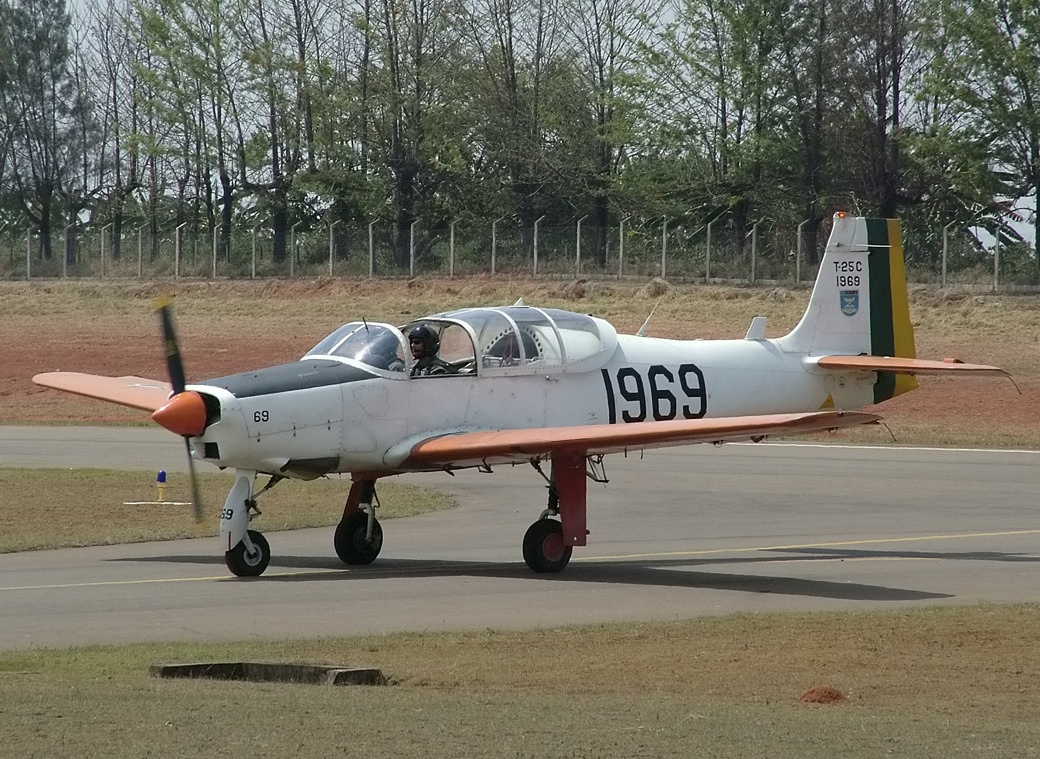
- A T-25 Universal taxiing at São Sebastião do Paraíso

General information
- Type: Basic trainer and ground attack aircraft
- National origin: Brazil
- Manufacturer: Neiva
- Primary users: Brazilian Air Force Chilean Air Force
- Number built: 189

History
- First flight: 29 April 1966

The Neiva N621 Universal is a Brazilian propeller-driven basic trainer and ground attack aircraft manufactured by Indústria Aeronáutica Neiva. It is a cantilever, low-wing monoplane of all-metal construction, with retractable undercarriage and side-by-side seating.

== Design and development ==
The Universal was designed in 1963 by Joseph Kovács (Note: Kovács later led the team that designed the Embraer EMB-312 Tucano.) as a new primary trainer for the Brazilian Air Force, as a replacement for the T-6 Texan and Fokker S-11/S-12 types then in use. The prototype (Registration PP-ZTW) first flew on 29 April 1966. The Brazilian Air Force ordered 150 aircraft as the T-25 Universal, and increased this order in 1978 by an additional 28 aircraft. A further developed version (designated the YT-25B Universal II) first flew on 22 October 1978, but was not put into production.

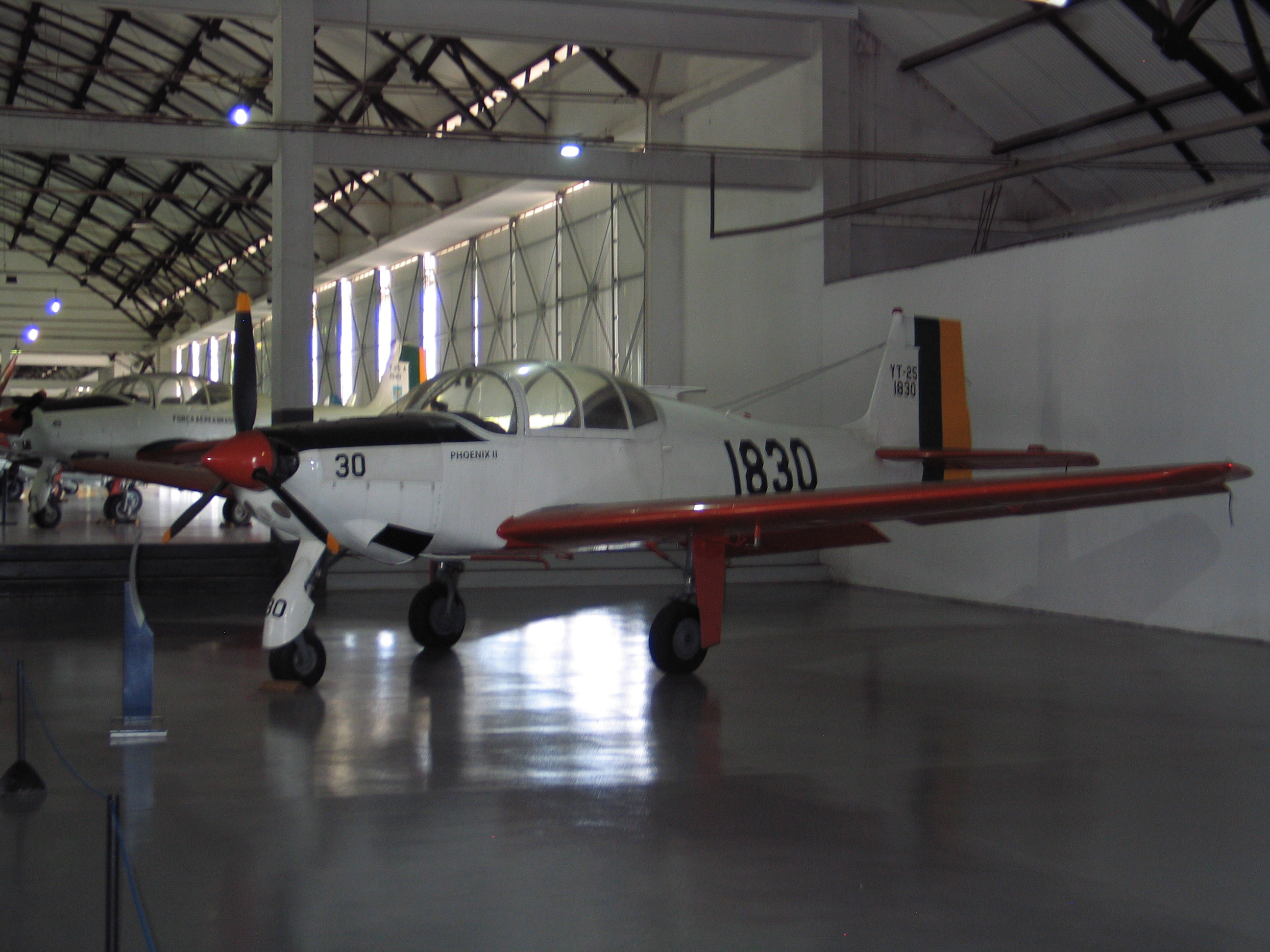
A neiva universal on display.

The Universal was also adopted as a counter-insurgency aircraft. It was later replaced by the Tucano in both the advanced training and attack roles, but it is still used as a primary and basic trainer at the Academia da Força Aérea Brasileira (Brazilian Air Force Academy).

Ten aircraft were ordered by the Chilean Army. These aircraft were later transferred to the Chilean Air Force. In 1983 five FACh T-25s were donated to the Paraguayan Air Force.

In 2005, the Brazilian Air Force donated six T-25s to the Fuerza Aérea Paraguaya and another six to the Fuerza Aérea Boliviana.

== Operators ==
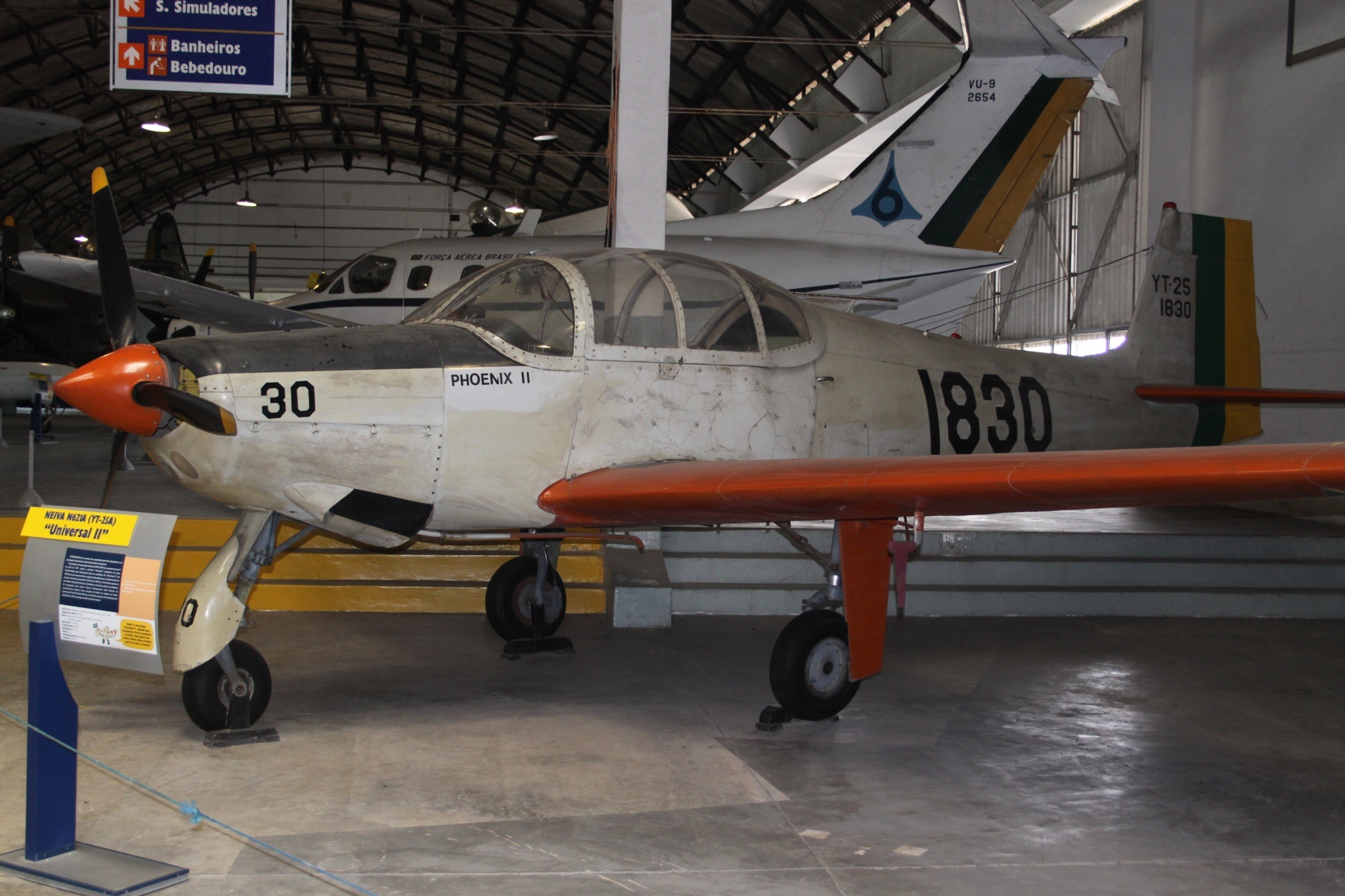
Prototype of the YT-25A Universal II

Bolivia

- Bolivian Air Force

Brazil

- Brazilian Air Force

Chile

- Chilean Air Force
- Chilean Army

Paraguay

- Paraguayan Air Force

== Specifications (Universal) ==
Data from Jane's All the World's Aircraft 1976–77

General characteristics

- Crew: 2–3
- Length: 8.60 m (28 ft 3 in)
- Wingspan: 11.00 m (36 ft 1 in)
- Height: 3.00 m (9 ft 10 in)
- Wing area: 17.20 m^{2} (185.1 sq ft)
- Aspect ratio: 7.1:1
- Airfoil: NACA 63_{2}A315 at root, NACA 63_{1}212 at tip
- Empty weight: 1,150 kg (2,535 lb)
- Max takeoff weight: 1,700 kg (3,748 lb)
- Fuel capacity: 332 L (88 US gal; 73 imp gal)
- Powerplant: 1 × Lycoming IO-540-K1D5 six-cylinder horizontally-opposed air-cooled piston engine, 220 kW (300 hp)
- Propellers: 2-bladed Hartzell HC-C2YK-4/C8475-A2 non-feathering constant speed propeller, 2.13 m (7 ft 0 in) diameter

Performance

- Maximum speed: 300 km/h (190 mph, 160 kn) at sea level
- Cruise speed: 285 km/h (177 mph, 154 kn) at sea level (max. cruise, 75% power)
- Stall speed: 104 km/h (65 mph, 56 kn) (flaps down)
- Never exceed speed: 500 km/h (310 mph, 270 kn)
- Range: 1,500 km (930 mi, 810 nmi)
- Service ceiling: 6,100 m (20,000 ft)
- Rate of climb: 6.66 m/s (1,312 ft/min)
- Takeoff run to 15 m (50 ft): 510 m (1,670 ft)
- Landing run from 15 m (50 ft): 600 m (1,969 ft)

Armament

- Guns: 7.62 mm machine gun pods on hardpoints
- Hardpoints: 2
