= Ozires Silva =

Brazilian entrepreneur (born 1931)

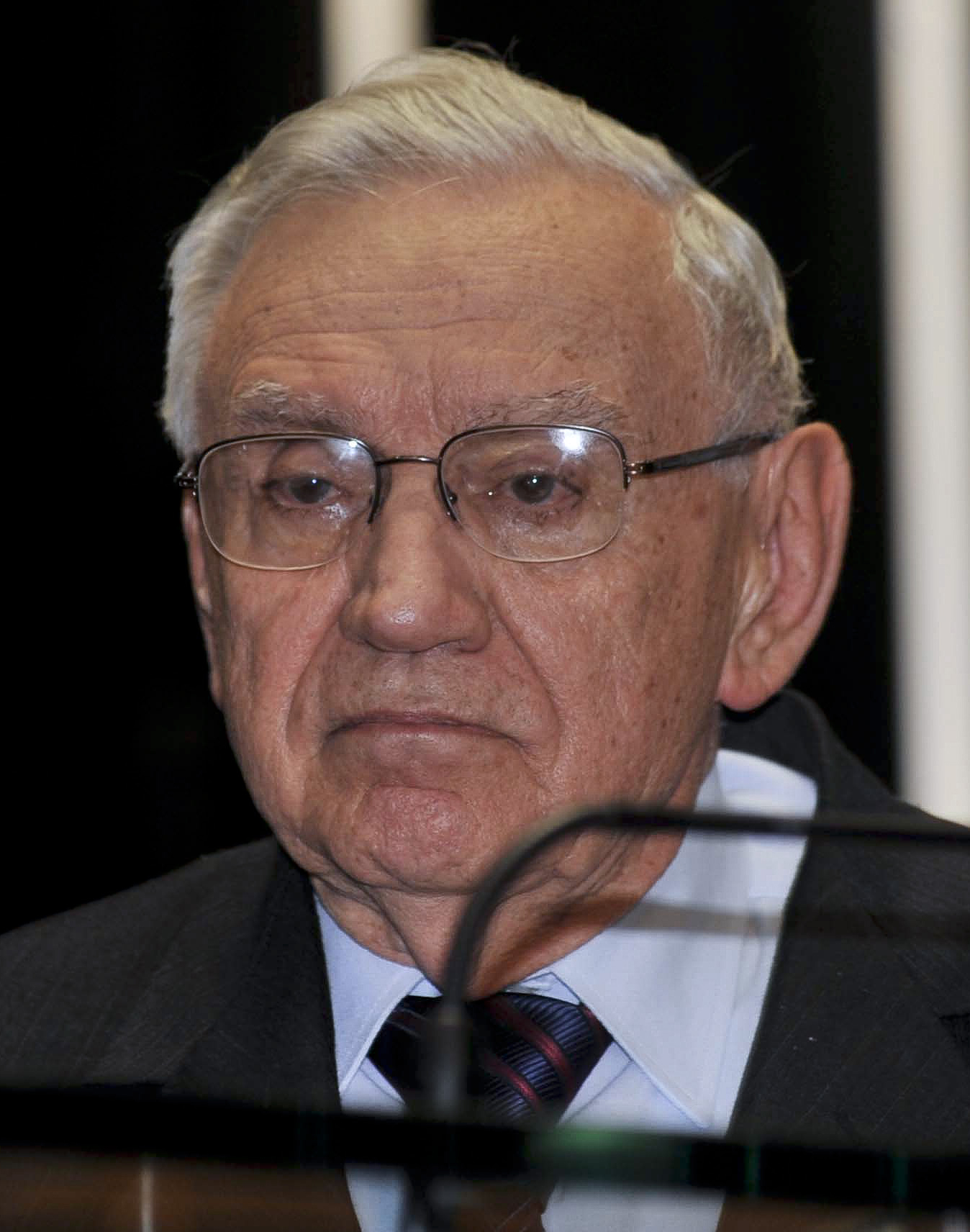
- Ozires Silva in 2011
- Born: 8 January 1931 (age 95); Bauru, São Paulo, Brazil
- Education: Instituto Tecnológico de Aeronáutica
- Occupations: Military pilot, Aeronautical engineer, CEO, Minister (government), Dean
- Organization(s): ITA, Embraer, Petrobras, Brazilian government, Varig
- Known for: Founder and first Embraer president
- Website: Ozires Silva

Ozires Silva (born 8 January 1931) is a Brazilian entrepreneur who is the founder of Embraer.

Ozires was born in Bauru–São Paulo state. He graduated on Escola de Aeronáutica do Campo dos Afonsos (Rio de Janeiro) as a military pilot. He then served the Brazilian Air Force for 4 years in the Amazon rainforest region.

In 1962, Ozires graduated from the Aeronautics Technological Institute (ITA) as an aeronautical engineer. He was immediately hired by the Brazilian General Command for Aerospace Technology (CTA), where he would become part of the IPD - Instituto de Pesquisas e Desenvolvimento (current IAE - Instituto de Aeronáutica e Espaço). He soon became the lead engineer of the Bandeirante project.

The first Bandeirante prototype flew on October 26, 1968. After that, Ozires attempted to convince private industries to produce the Bandeirante in series, without success. His efforts, however, contributed to the creation of a government-owned aircraft manufacturer, Embraer, of which he became president on July 29, 1969.

In 1986, Ozires left Embraer. He became president of Petrobras for a short time, and also became Minister of Infrastructure from March 15, 1990, to March 27, 1991. He returned to Embraer from 1991 to 1995 to conduct the privatization process. He was also president of Varig from 2000 to 2002.

Ozires Silva was one of the first witnesses to report the May 19 1986 Brazilian UFO incident, when he was flying on an executive Xingu turbo-prop plane.

Ozires is also former (2004) Director of Technology of AVAMAX, Executive Vice-president of Academia Brasileira de Estudos Avançados "Dr. Adolfo Bezerra de Menezes Cavalcanti", and President of Pele Nova, a biotechnology company and President at World Trade Center Advisory Board.

He is currently dean of Unimonte, a private university in Brazil.

== Published books ==
- A Decolagem de um Sonho - História da Criação da Embraer - Lemos Editorial - 1998
- Cartas a um Jovem Empreendedor - Elsevier Editora - 2006
- A Decolagem de um Grande Sonho - Elsevier Editora - 2008
- Ethanol - A Brazilian revolution - 2008
