= 1986 Brazilian UFO incident =

Radar and visual sighting of several UFOs across Brazil

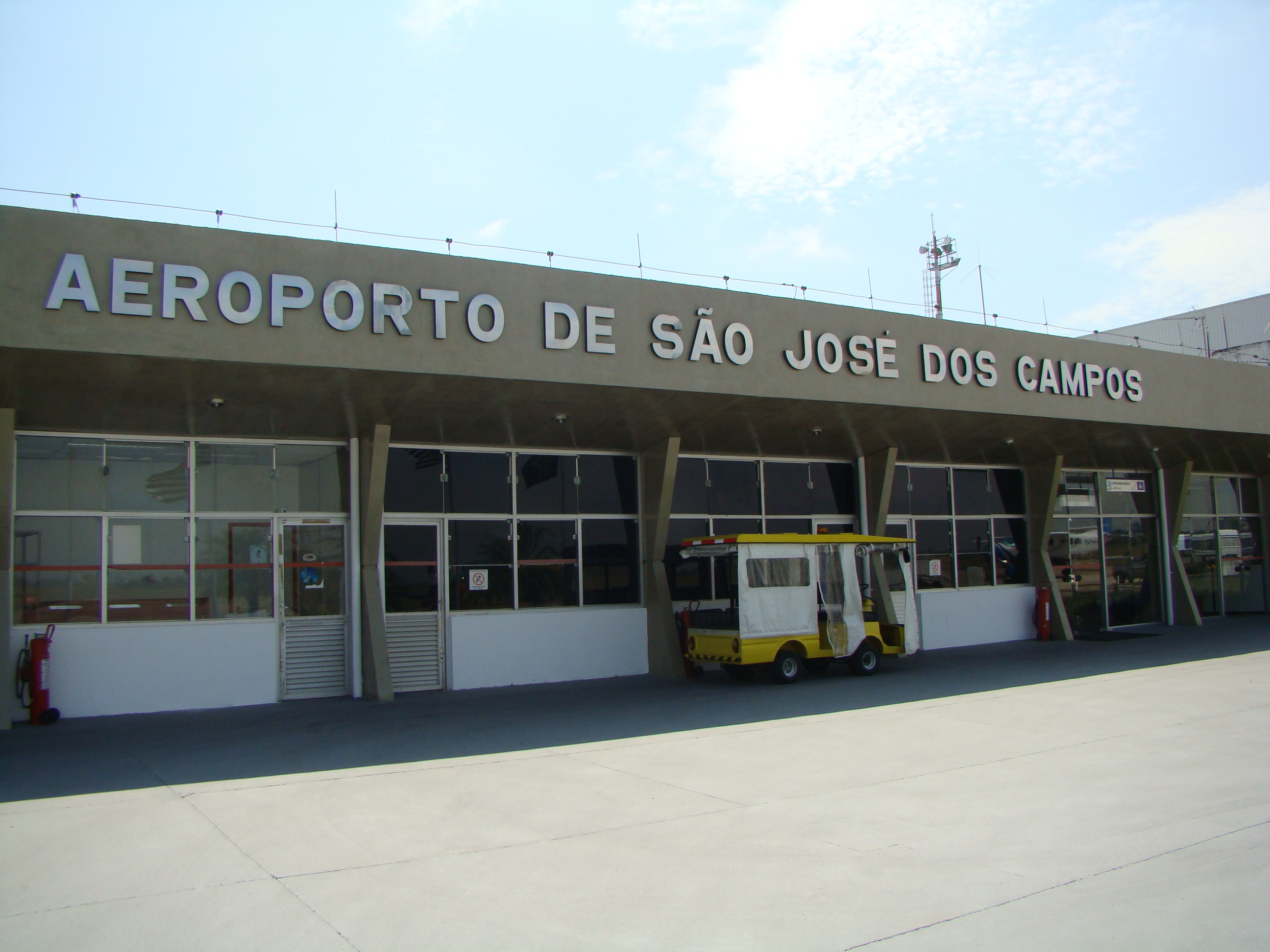
Aeroporto Internacional Professor Urbano Ernesto Stumpf, where the first objects were sighted

On 19 May 1986, a series of radar and visual contacts with unidentified flying objects (UFOs) took place across the Brazilian states of São Paulo, Rio de Janeiro, Minas Gerais, and Goiás, becoming locally known as the "Night of the UFOs" (Portuguese: "Noite Oficial dos OVNIs").

== Incident ==
At around 8:15 p.m. BRT on 19 May 1986, Sérgio Mota da Silva, an air traffic controller at São José dos Campos Airport (SJK), spotted three bright lights hovering over the airport in the night sky, and Guarulhos International Airport detected contacts in the vicinity of São José dos Campos. Sérgio observed the objects with a pair of binoculars, noticing that they seemed to emit a bright red light, yet were often changing colors to the yellow, green, and orange parts of the spectrum. Dimming the runway lights, he noticed that the objects seemed to approach the airport, moving away once the intensity of the lights was increased again.

At 9:08 p.m., an EMB 121 Xingu plane, callsign PT-MBZ, on its way towards SJK from Brasília, reported seeing bright red lights at radial 150 of SJK's VOR, moving east to west near the coast. The aircraft that reported witnessing the lights was flown by Colonel Ozires Silva, the founder of Embraer (a Brazilian multinational aerospace corporation), who was returning from a meeting with President José Sarney and who would take office as president of Petrobras on the following day. According to Silva, the objects seemed like "big red stars". He then proceeded, of his own accord, to attempt to approach the objects, without success.

By 9:39 p.m., Santa Cruz Air Force Base was put on alert due to the presence of several unidentified radar plots around São José dos Campos. Around a half hour later, Anápolis Air Force Base reported the detection of radar echoes at radial 270 of its VOR, prompting the air base to also be put on alert. The radar contacts obtained by Anápolis were not being detected by the Center of Military Operations (COpM) located in CINDACTA I.

At 10:27 p.m., a F-5E of 1º/1ºGAvCa "Jambock", callsign JB17, was scrambled from Santa Cruz AFB, taking off just seven minutes later. The pilot, approaching at an altitude of 17,000 feet (5,200 m), reported having detected a radar plot and making visual contact with a white light that then proceeded to climb, steadily maintaining itself 10 to 12 miles (16 to 19 km) away and 10° above his aircraft until it reached 33,000 feet (10,000 m). During this period, the pilot reported that the light changed from white to red, then to green, and then back to white again. The object was followed towards the sea until it was around 180 miles (290 km) from Santa Cruz, at which point the F-5 reached bingo fuel and had to return to base.

At 10:48, Anápolis AFB launched their first Mirage IIIE interceptor from the 1st Air Defense Group "Jaguar", callsign JG116, who eventually obtained five radar contacts but no visual contacts. At one point, the Mirage managed to get within 2 miles (3.2 km) of one of the contacts, whose movements seemed to indicate zigzagging and 90-degree turns, before the presumed object rapidly moved away despite the interceptor's supersonic speed. In a 1993 interview with TV Globo, the pilot estimated the object's velocity at Mach 15.

A Brazilian Mirage IIIE of the 1st Air Defense Group

By 10:50 p.m., a second F-5E, callsign JB07, took off from Santa Cruz, reporting visual and radar contact with an object emitting a bright red light. According to the Brazilian Air Force report, after an unsuccessful attempt to close the distance, the light seemed to "turn off" and the radar contact was simultaneously lost. Some time afterwards, the controller at Santa Cruz Air Base detected 13 radar plots directly behind JB07 and instructed the aircraft to turn 180 degrees. As the F-5E turned, however, the pilot was neither able to make visual contact nor did he pick up anything on his radar.

Two additional Mirage IIIE interceptors were launched in Anápolis, but the pilots did not report any further visual or radar contacts. In total, 21 radar plots were obtained during the incident.

== Press conference ==
Then-Commander of the Brazilian Air Force Octávio Júlio Moreira Lima held a press conference on 23 May along with the fighter pilots, confirming the events from four days earlier, stating: "It's not about believing or not [in aliens]. We can only give out technical information. There are several hypotheses. Technically, I'd tell you gentlemen that we have no explanation."

== Declassification of documents ==
The official Brazilian Air Force report on the incident was declassified on 25 September 2009. In its final considerations, the document stated, among other things, that the unidentified aerial phenomena were capable of:

- Varying their velocities from subsonic to supersonic, as well as hovering;
- Varying their altitudes from below 5,000 feet (1,500 m) to above 40,000 feet (12,000 m);
- Emitting white, green, and red lights, or emitting no light at all;
- Sudden acceleration or deceleration;
- Turning with constant radiuses as well as sharp 90-degree turns;
- Showing intelligence in their capabilities to maintain distance from the observers as well as flying in formation, though not being necessarily crewed.

The report also pointed to the efficiency of the bases' responses, as seven armed aircraft were available for use within 30 minutes of the threat's detection.

== See also ==
- UFO sightings in Brazil
- List of UFO sightings
- Varginha UFO incident
