= São José dos Campos Airport =

São José dos Campos-Professor Urbano Ernesto Stumpf International Airport Aeroporto Internacional de São José dos Campos-Professor Urbano Ernesto Stumpf
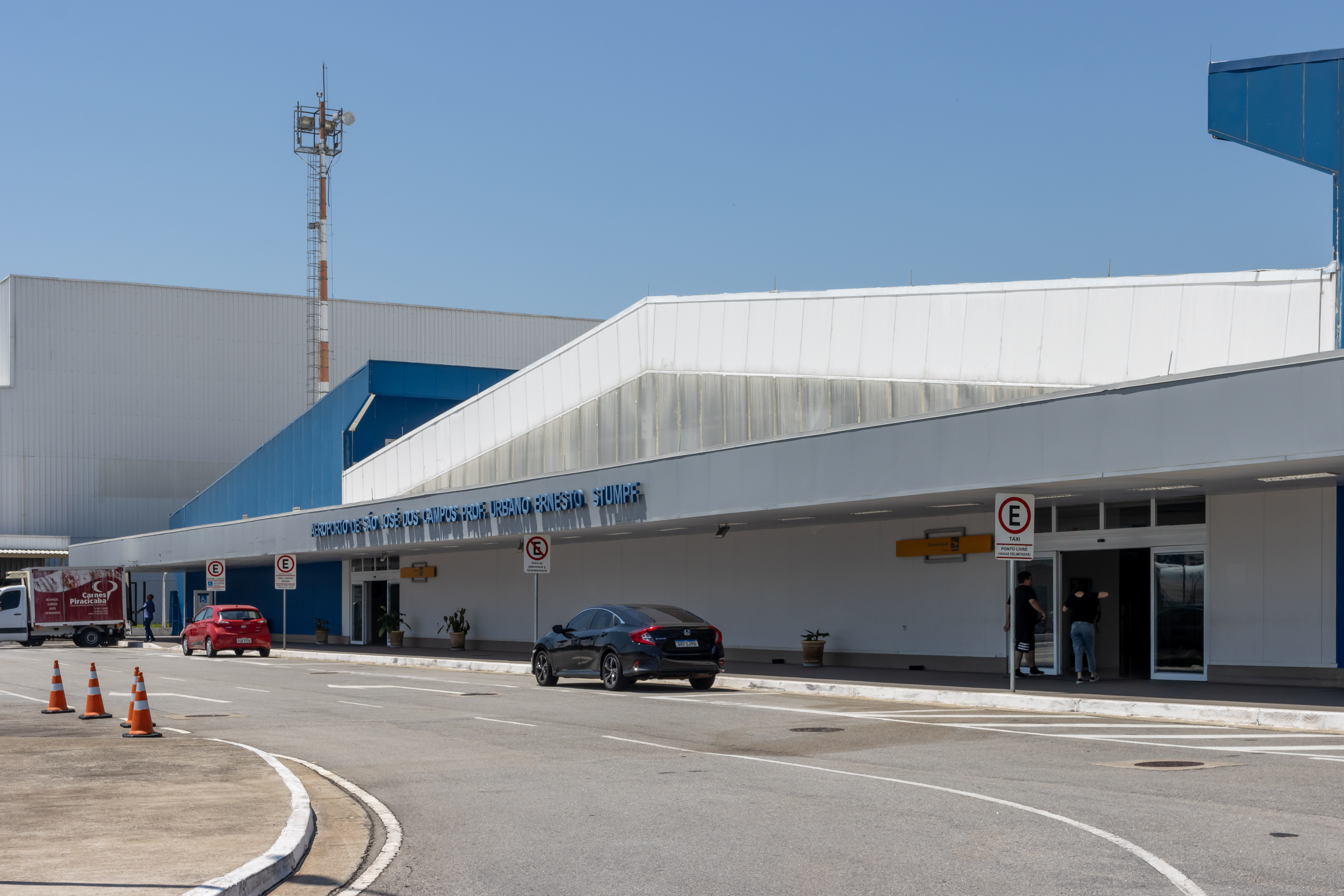
- IATA: SJK; ICAO: SBSJ; LID: SP0008

Summary
- Airport type: Public
- Operator: Infraero (1996–2020); São José dos Campos (2020–2022); SJK Airport (2022–present)
- Serves: São José dos Campos
- Time zone: BRT (UTC−03:00)
- Elevation AMSL: 647 m (2,123 ft)
- Coordinates: 23°13′44″S 045°52′16″W
- Website: www4.infraero.gov.br/aeroportos/aeroporto-internacional-de-sao-jose-dos-campos-professor-urbano-ernesto-stumpf/

Map
- Location in Brazil SJK (Brazil)

Runways
Direction	Length		Surface
Direction	m	ft	Surface
16/34	2,675	8,776	Asphalt

Statistics (2021)
- Passengers: 24,378 ▼63%
- Aircraft Operations: 10,757 ▲47%
- Metric tonnes of cargo: 0 ▼100%
- Statistics: Infraero; Sources: Airport Website, ANAC, DECEA

São José dos Campos-Professor Urbano Ernesto Stumpf International Airport (IATA: SJK, ICAO: SBSJ), is the airport serving São José dos Campos, Brazil. Since November 9, 2004, it is named after Urbano Ernesto Stumpf (1916–1998), colonel-aviator, Aerospace Engineer, professor at several universities and inventor of the motor that runs on ethanol fuel.

The airport is operated by SJK Airport.

The airport shares some facilities with the Department of Aerospace Science and Technology (Portuguese: Departamento de Ciência e Tecnologia Aeroespacial-CTA), Embraer and the flying club of São José dos Campos.

== History ==
Built in the 1950s basically to serve the Department of Aerospace Science and Technology, the airport originally had only a dirt runway. In the 1970s, the runway was paved with asphalt and lengthened to 3,000 meters. The airport was also equipped to handle instrument landings and an apron that is able to accommodate large cargo aircraft.

The 1986 Brazilian UFO incident happened on 19 May 1986.

It has been certified for international cargo flights since 2000. Treatment of cargo, as well as fees for warehousing and handling, are similar to those of other Infraero freight terminals. However some discounts are applied seeking to reduce costs and streamline the clearance process, an important factor for local industries.

The passenger terminal has a capacity for 90,000/year and is served by a snack bar, taxis and public telephones.

On December 2, 2020, the Federal Government signed and agreement to transfer the administration of the airport from Infraero to the Municipality of São José dos Campos.

On February 21, 2022, Aeropart won a 30-year concession to operate the airport. Later, Aeropart was rebranded SJK Airport.

== Airlines and destinations ==
=== Passenger ===
Airlines	Destinations
Gol Linhas Aéreas	Rio de Janeiro–Galeão

=== Cargo ===
Airlines	Destinations
LATAM Cargo Brasil	Brussels, Miami

== Accidents and incidents ==
- 19 May 1986: a local air traffic controller spotted three bright red objects around the airport, in what would be the 1986 Brazilian UFO incident.
- 8 July 1988: a Brazilian Air Force Embraer EMB 120RT Brasília registration FAB-2001 crashed during an engine-out landing at São José dos Campos. Five of the 9 occupants died.
- 9 July 1997: a TAM Airlines Fokker 100 registration PT-WHK operating flight 283 en route from São José dos Campos to São Paulo-Congonhas was climbing after take-off from São José dos Campos when a bomb exploded in the rear part of the passenger cabin. The uncontrolled decompression blew one passenger out of the aircraft. The aircraft made a successful emergency landing in São Paulo, despite the hole in the fuselage.

== Access ==
The airport is located 12 km (7 mi) from downtown São José dos Campos.

== See also ==
- List of airports in Brazil
