= Anápolis Air Force Base =

Air base of the Brazilian Air Force

- Base Aérea de Anápolis
- Anápolis, Goiás in Brazil
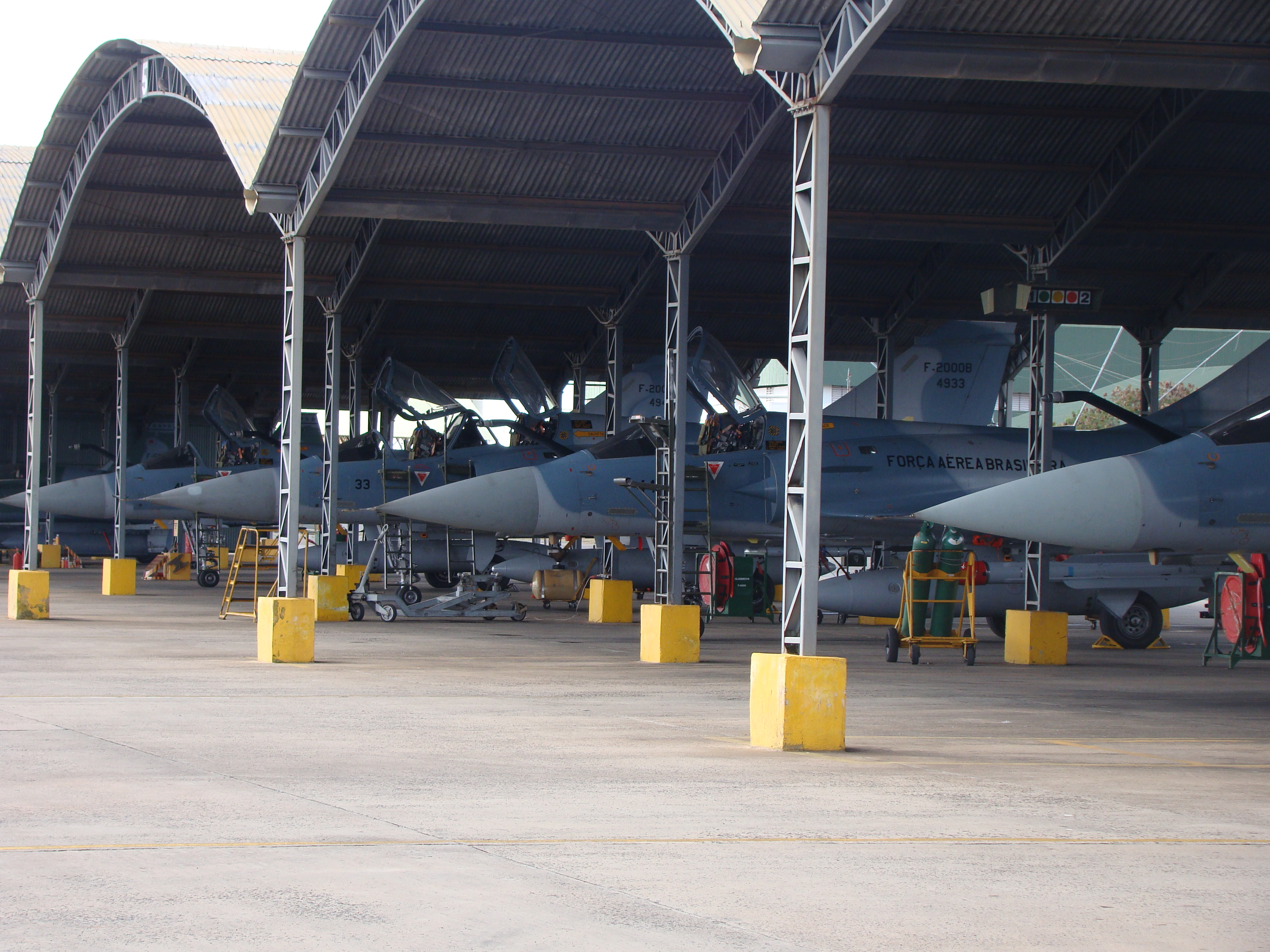
- Mirages 2000 at Anápolis in 2008

Site information
- Type: Air Force Base
- Code: ALA2
- Owner: Brazilian Air Force
- Controlled by: Brazilian Air Force
- Open to the public: No
- Website: fab.mil.br/organizacoes/mostra/34

Location
- Location in Brazil
- Coordinates: 16°14′19″S 048°58′20″W
- Area: 16,000 hectares (61.8 sq mi; 160.0 km^{2})

Site history
- Built: 1970-1972
- In use: 1972-present

Garrison information
- Current commander: Cel. Av. Renato Leal Leite
- Occupants: 1st Troop Transportation Group; 1st Air Defense Group; 2nd Squadron of the 6th Aviation Group

Airfield information
- Identifiers: ICAO: SBAN, LID: GO9001
- Elevation: 1,137 metres (3,730 ft) AMSL
Runways
Direction	Length and surface
06R/24L	2,233 metres (7,326 ft) Asphalt
06L/24R	3,300 metres (10,827 ft) Asphalt

Anápolis Air Force Base – ALA2 (ICAO: SBAN) is a base of the Brazilian Air Force, located in Anápolis, Brazil.

== History ==
The history of Anápolis Air Force Base begins on 9 February 1970, when its construction started, with the main purpose of receiving the new air force fighter at the time, the Mirage III, designated by the Brazilian Air Force as F-103. For strategic reasons, was decided that the new air base would be close to the capital Brasília. After several studies (including issues of air traffic and radio interference) the choice was the city of Anápolis, located 160 km from Brasília.

The facility became operational on 23 August 1972, with the completion of the airstrip. A new air unit, specially created to operate the F-103, was then activated: the 1st Air Defense Wing (1º ALADA). This unit was decommissioned on 19 April 1979, transferring its mission to the 1st Air Defense Group (1º GDA), the unit was responsible for operating the F-103 until 2005. In 2006, started to operate the Mirage 2000, already retired. Currently operates the F-5EM & FM.

From 2021 operates the JAS 39 Gripen, designated by Brazil as F-39 E & F.

== Units ==
The following units are based at Anápolis Air Force Base:

Aircraft	Model	Air unit
	Embraer KC-390	1st Troop Transportation Group (1º GTT) Zeus
	Saab JAS F-39 Gripen E & F	1st Air Defense Group (1º GDA) Jaguar
	Northrop F-5 EM & FM	1st Air Defense Group (1º GDA) Jaguar
	Embraer E-99 M & R-99	2nd Squadron of the 6th Aviation Group (2º/6º GAv) Guardião

The base also operates a battery of surface to air missile called 3rd Air Defense Group (3º GDAAE).

== Retired aircraft ==
Dassault Mirage III

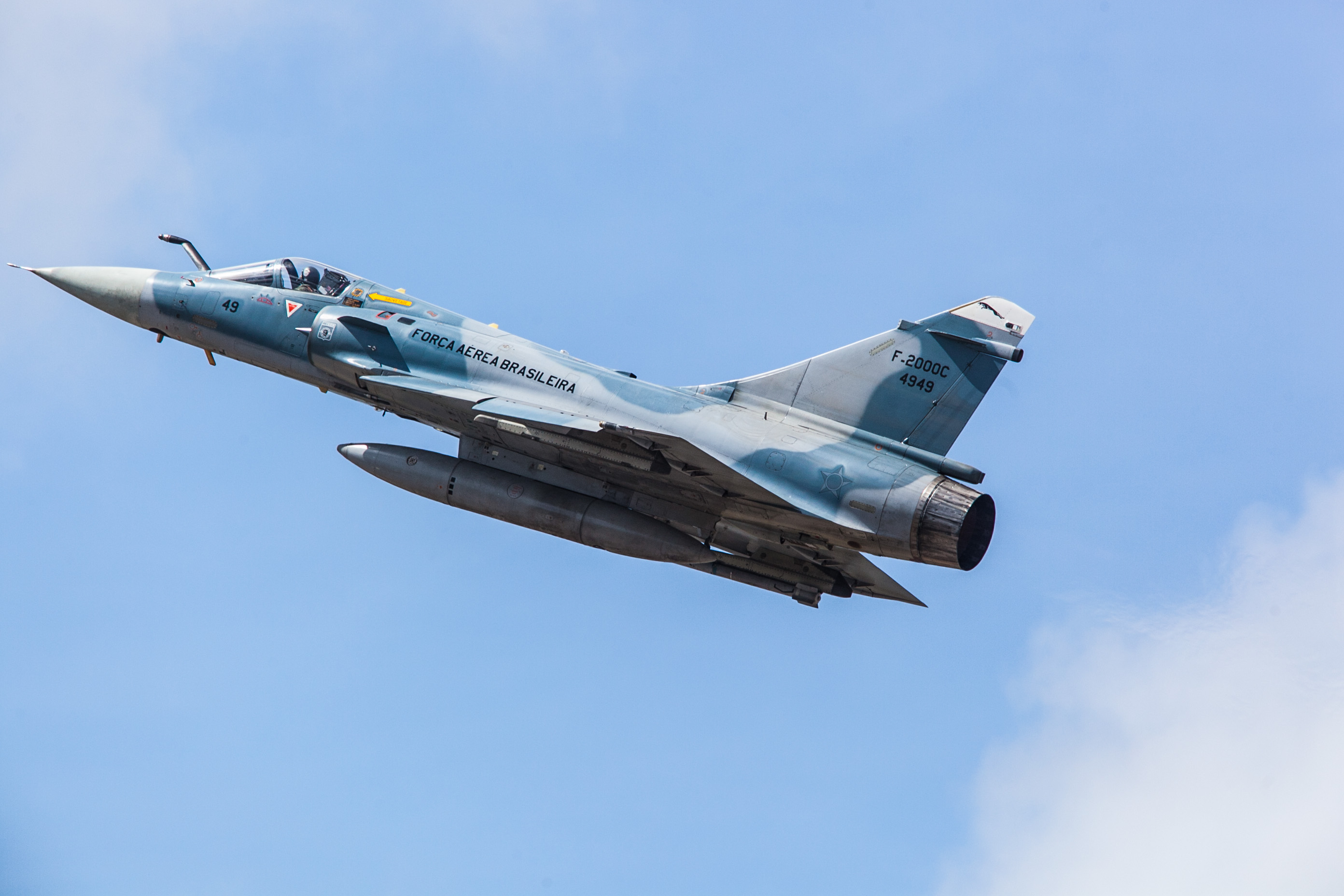
Dassault Mirage 2000

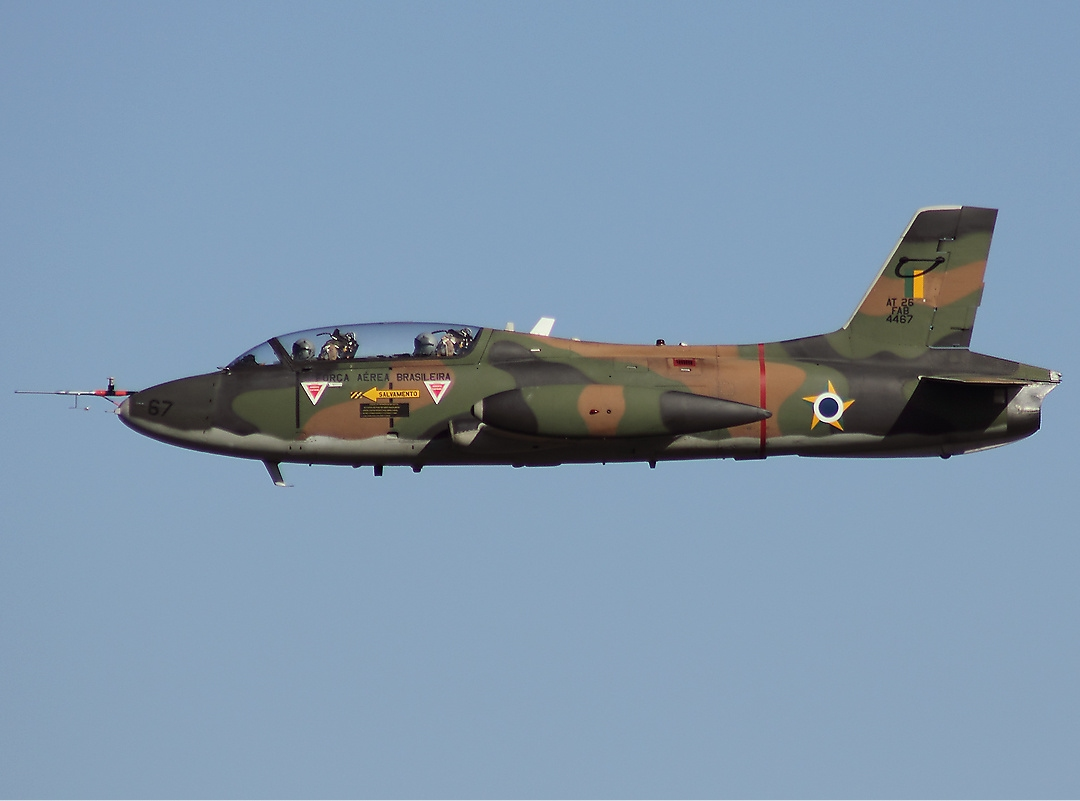
Embraer AT-26 Xavante

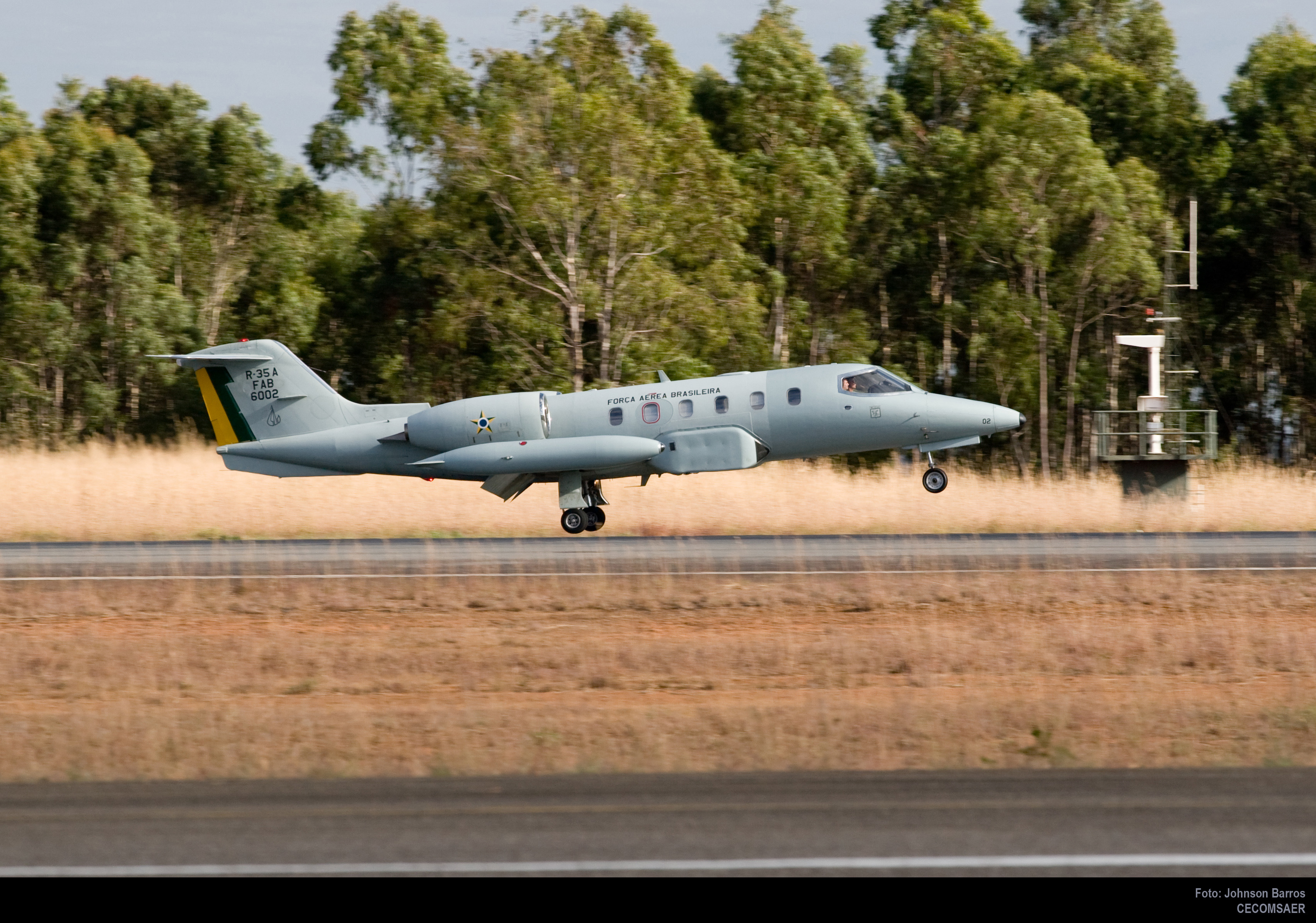
Learjet R-35

== Access ==
The base is located 12 km from downtown Anápolis.

== See also ==
- List of Brazilian military bases
