= Brazilian Air Force =

- Força Aérea Brasileira
- Founded: 20 January 1941; 85 years ago
- Country: Brazil
- Type: Air force
- Role: Aerial warfare
- Size: 67,500 personnel (2025); 578 aircraft (2025)
- Part of: Brazilian Armed Forces
- Headquarters: Brasília
- Patron: Alberto Santos-Dumont; Eduardo Gomes
- Mottos: Portuguese: Asas que protegem o País "Wings that protect the country"
- March: Hino dos Aviadores
- Anniversaries: 22 May (anniversary); 22 April (fighter aviation day)
- Engagements: Contestado War; Lieutenants Revolts; Bombing of São Paulo; Constitutionalist War; World War II; Lobster War; Cold War; Três Passos Guerrilla; Caparaó Guerrilla; Araguaia Guerrilla War; Operation Traira; Angolan Civil War
- Website: www.fab.mil.br

Commanders
- Commander-in-Chief: President Luiz Inácio Lula da Silva
- Minister of Defence: José Múcio
- Commander of the Air Force: Marcelo Kanitz Damasceno

Insignia
- Flag

- Roundel

- Fin flash

Aircraft flown
- Attack: AMX A-1, A-29 Super Tucano
- Electronic warfare: EMB 145 AEW&C, EMB-145 RS
- Fighter: F-5EM Tiger II, JAS 39 Gripen E/F
- Helicopter: AS332 Super Puma, EC 135, UH-60 Black Hawk, EC725 Super Cougar
- Patrol: P-3 Orion, EMB 111, IAI Heron
- Reconnaissance: EMB 110, AMX RA-1, Learjet 35, Hermes 450, Hermes 900, IAI Heron
- Trainer: F-5FM Tiger II, AMX A-1B, AT-27 Tucano, AT-29 Super Tucano, T-25 Universal, HB350B Esquilo
- Transport: C-390 Millennium, Caravan II, EADS CASA C-295, Airbus A319, EMB 190, EMB 500, ERJ 135, EMB 110, EMB 120, EMB 145
- Tanker: KC-390 Millennium, Airbus A330 MRTT

The Brazilian Air Force (Portuguese: Força Aérea Brasileira, FAB) is the aerial branch of the Brazilian Armed Forces, and one of the three national uniformed services. The FAB was formed in 1941 when the air branches of the Brazilian Army and Navy were merged into a single military force, initially called the "National Air Forces". In 2025, the Brazilian Air Force had an active strength of 67,500 personnel and operated around 578 aircraft, of which 173 were combat aircraft. The Brazilian Air Force is the largest air force in the Southern Hemisphere.

== History ==
=== Contestado Campaign ===
The Contestado War was the first conflict in which Brazilian military aviation was employed. On September 19, 1914, taking advantage of a special train driving troops, three aircraft were boarded: a Morane-Saulnier biplane, a Morane-Saulnier monoplane, and a Blitzer SIT biplane. The train continued from Rio de Janeiro passing through São Paulo where it would reach the São Paulo – Rio Grande railway to the station of União da Vitória.

Along the way, sparks shot through the locomotive, hitting a gallon of gasoline in one of the wagons carrying the dismantled aircraft. The fire spread, much like the planes. After the crash, only the Morane-Saulnier remained in flying condition.

In the conflict zone, he coordinated the construction of runways and hangars to be used in União da Vitória, Canoinhas and Rio Negro. Then, two Morane-Saulnier and special ammunition were brought from Rio de Janeiro, as well as a mechanic.

The first aerial activity occurred only on January 4, 1915, when a training flight followed the course of the Iguaçú River to the Timbo River. The first official mission took place on January 19 and the duration of the flight was just over an hour.

The following week, on February 25, 1915, a Morane-Saulnier had an accident. During a test flight in the vicinity of the field, the engine stopped and the aircraft crashed with total loss, pilot survived.

March 1, 1915 was the scheduled date for a heavy attack on the rebels. The mission was to fly over the Valley of Santa Maria, to launch bombs on the rebels' stronghold, and to observe and direct the shots of the artillery and the advance of the infantry. Two Morane-Saulnier aircraft took off, but the attack was canceled due to adverse weather conditions, for the aircraft piloted by then lieutenant-aviator Ricardo Kirk suffered a crash, of which he was killed.

Ricardo Kirk was the first Brazilian Military Aviator. In 1891 he entered the Military Academy and was commissioned an ensign in November, 1893 and to first-lieutenant in March, 1898 and posthumously to captain in 1915.

=== Air actions of the Constitutionalist Revolution ===
Although the two sides in struggle had few airplanes during the Constitutionalist Revolution of 1932, aviation made a big impact during the conflict. The federal government had approximately 58 aircraft divided between the Navy and the Army.

On the other hand, the Paulistas had only two Potez 25 and two Waco planes, in addition to a small number of tourist planes. At the end of July, the rebel government obtained another plane, brought by Lieutenant Artur Mota Lima, who defected from Campo dos Afonsos, Rio de Janeiro. The "reds", as the federal government planes were known, not only acted on the lines of combat, but also were used to bombard several cities of São Paulo, among them Campinas, where they caused great damage. They also served as a propaganda weapon, dropping leaflets on enemy cities and into rebel concentration camps.

For the use of aerial means, General Góis Monteiro had in his Staff of two advisers, Captains Vasco Alves Secco and Carlos Pfaltzgraff Brazil.

Major Eduardo Gomes, commander of the Joint Aviation Group, who since the outbreak of hostilities had coordinated the employment of his unit and the reinforcements of the Military Aviation School, was designated, on September 16, Commander of the Air Units of the Army Detachment of the East.

On September 6, Major Ajalmar Vieira Mascarenhas was appointed Commander of the Air Units of the Detachment of the Southern Army.

The Navy's aircraft were under the direct operational control of the naval authorities, operating in support of the surface ships deployed near the port of Santos, to effect a naval blockade and also in support of the Naval Flotilla of Mato Grosso, based in Ladário. They also participated in operations with Military Aviation in the Paraíba Valley and on the southern front, in escort and observation missions.

The Air Force of São Paulo was under the overall command of Major Ivo Borges, Commander of the Aviation Units of the Constitutionalist Aviation, and Major Lysias A. Rodrigues, Commander of the Constitutionalist Aviation Group.

=== Establishment ===
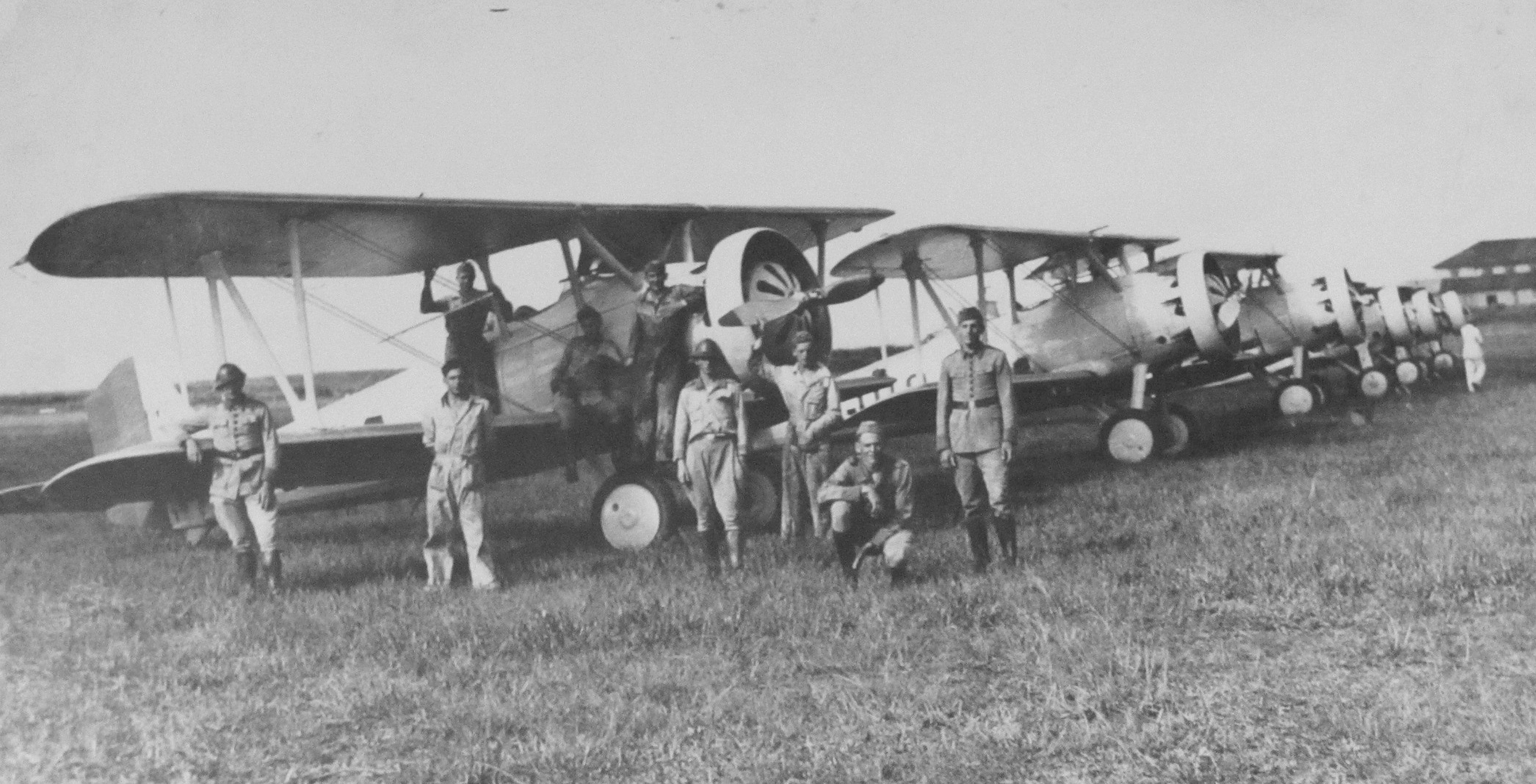
5th Aviation Regiment in Curitiba, Paraná, Brazil in 1932.

The establishment of the United Kingdom's Royal Air Force in April 1918, and the creation of the Italian Air Force (Regia Aeronautica) and the French Air Force during the 1920s drove the idea of uniting Brazilian air power under the same organization. Together with these events the Brazilian strategists were also influenced by the theories of Giulio Douhet, Billy Mitchell and Hugh Montague Trenchard.

The first public manifest to create an integrated military air service came up in 1928 when an army Major called Lysias Rodrigues wrote an article called "An urgent need: The Ministry of the Air" ("Uma premente necessidade: o Ministério do Ar"). Two years later the French Military Mission, working for the Brazilian Army, made the first steps to organize a national air arm. The idea got more support when a group of Brazilian airmen came from Italy in 1934 and explained the advantages of having a military aviation unified. Also, the Spanish Revolution and the first movements of World War II at the end of the thirties showed the importance of Air power for military strategies.

One of the main supporters of the plan to create an independent air arm was the then-president Getúlio Vargas. He organized a study group early in 1940 and the whole structure of the Ministry of Aeronautics (Ministério da Aeronáutica) was established the end of that year. This new governmental agency was responsible for the all aspects of the civil and military aviation including infrastructure, regulation and organization.

Formally, the Ministry of Aeronautics was founded on January 20, 1941, and so its military branch called "National Air Forces", changed to "Brazilian Air Force" (Força Aérea Brasileira – FAB) on May, 22. The Army (Aviação Militar) and Navy (Aviação Naval) air branches were extinguished and all personnel, aircraft, installations and other related equipment were transferred to FAB.

=== World War II ===
The Brazilian Air force made important contributions to the Allied war effort in World War II, especially as part of the Brazilian Expeditionary Force on the Italian front.

From mid-1942 until the end of the war, the FAB also patrolled the Atlantic. On 31 July 1943 it claimed the German submarine U-199, which was located on the surface, off Rio de Janeiro, at 23°54′S 42°54′W. Two Brazilian aircraft, a PBY Catalina and a Lockheed Hudson, and an American PBM Mariner attacked the U-boat. The Catalina, named Ärará, was captained by 2nd Lt. Alberto M. Torres, and hit U-199 with depth charges, sinking her. Forty-nine of the crew were killed, although twelve Germans managed to escape, including the captain. This was possible due to the Catalina's crew, who threw a lifeboat to the survivors. "1st Fighter Group", which saw action in Italy, was formed on December 18, 1943. Its commanding officer was Aviation Lt.Col. Nero Moura.

The group had 350 men, including 43 pilots. The group was divided into four flights: Red ("A"), Yellow ("B"), Blue ("C"), and Green ("D"). The CO of the group and some officers were not attached to any specific flight. Unlike the BEF's Army component, the 1º GAVCA had personnel who were experienced Brazilian Air Force pilots. One of them was Alberto M. Torres, who had piloted a PBY Catalina that had sunk U-199, operating off the Brazilian coast.

The group trained for combat in Panama, where 2º Ten.-Av. (Aviation Second Lieutenant) Dante Isidoro Gastaldoni was killed in a training accident. On May 11, 1944, the group was declared operational and became active in the air defense of the Panama Canal Zone. On June 22, the 1º GAVCA traveled to the US to convert to the Republic P-47D Thunderbolt.

On September 19, 1944, the 1º GAVCA left for Italy, arriving at Livorno on October 6. It became part of the 350th Fighter Group of the USAAF, which in turn was part of the 62nd Fighter Wing, XXII Tactical Air Command, of the 12th Air Force.

The Brazilian pilots initially flew from 31 October 1944, as individual elements of flights attached to 350th FG squadrons, at first in affiliation flights and progressively taking part in more dangerous missions. Less than two weeks later, on November 11, the group started its own operations flying from its base at Tarquinia, using its tactical callsign Jambock. Brazilian Air Force stars replaced the white U.S. star in the roundel on the FAB Thunderbolts. The 1^{o}GAVCA started its fighting career as a fighter-bomber unit, its missions being armed reconnaissance and interdiction, in support of the US Fifth Army, to which the FEB was attached. On April 16, 1945, the U.S. Fifth Army started its offensive along the Po Valley. By then, the strength of the Group had fallen to 25 pilots, some having been killed and others shot down and captured. Some others had been relieved from operations on medical grounds due to combat fatigue. The Group disbanded the Yellow flight and distributed the surviving pilots among the other flights. Each pilot flew on average two missions a day.

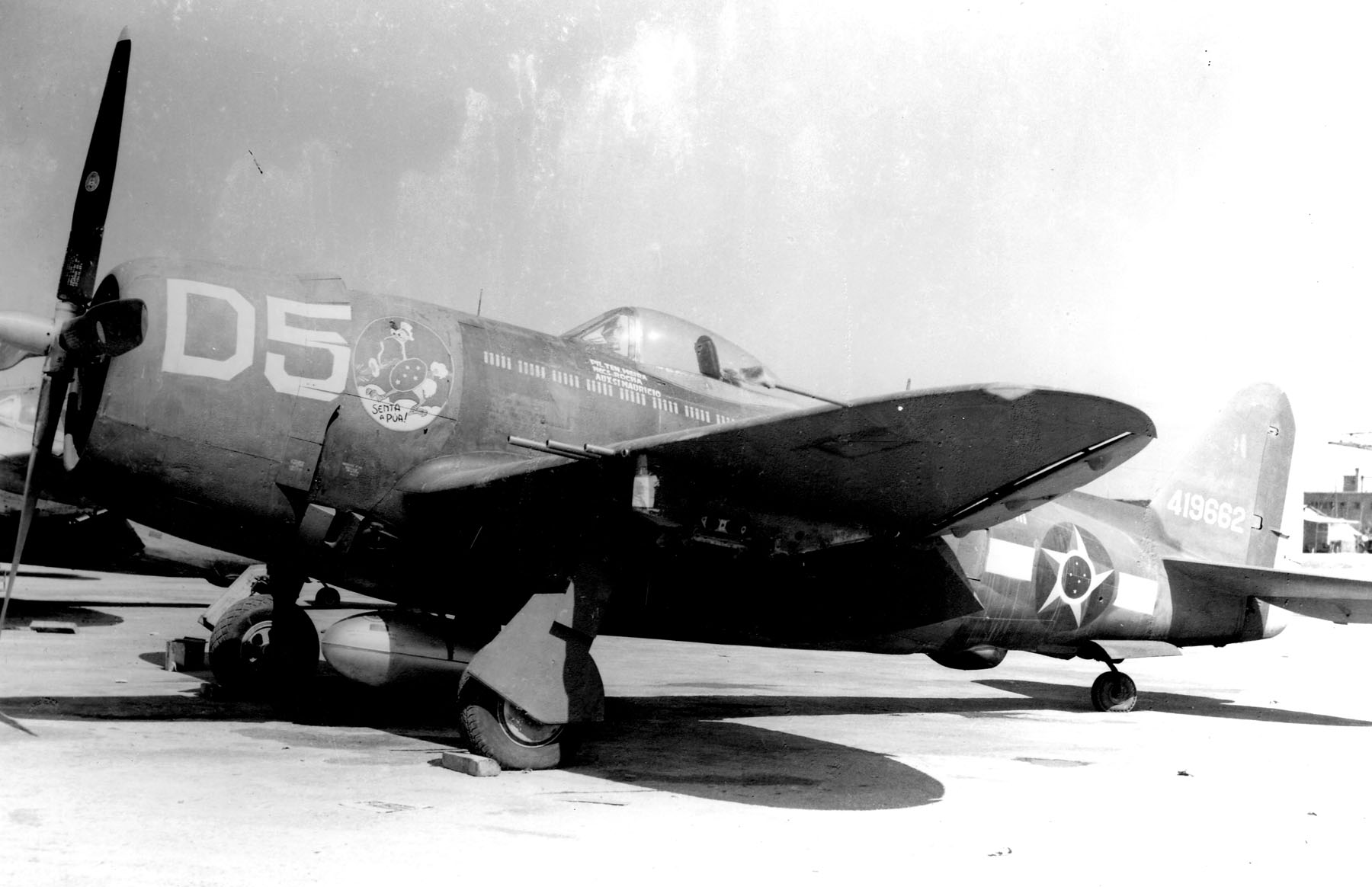
1º GAC P-47s carried the "Senta a Pua!" emblem as nose art along with the national insignia of Brazil.

On 22 April 1945, the three remaining flights took off at 5-minute intervals, starting at 8:30 AM, to destroy bridges, barges, and motorized vehicles in the San Benedetto region. At 10:00 AM, a flight took off for an armed reconnaissance mission south of Mantua. They destroyed more than 80 tanks, trucks, and vehicles. By the end of the day, the group had flown 44 individual missions and destroyed hundreds of vehicles and barges. On this day the group flew the most sorties of the war; consequently, Brazil commemorates April 22 Brazilian Fighter Arm Day.

In all, the 1^{o}GAVCA flew a total of 445 missions, 2,550 individual sorties, and 5,465 combat flight hours, from 11 November 1944 to 6 May 1945. The XXII Tactical Air Command acknowledged the efficiency of the Group by noting that although it flew only 5% of the total of missions carried out by all squadrons under its control, it accomplished a much higher percentage of the total destruction wrought:

- 85% of the ammunition depots
- 36% of the fuel depots
- 28% of the bridges (19% damaged)
- 15% of motor vehicles (13% damaged)
- 10% of horse-drawn vehicles (10% damaged)

=== Post World War II ===
After the war, the FAB began flying the British Gloster Meteor jet fighter. The jets were purchased from the British for 15,000 tons of crude cotton, as Brazil had no foreign currency reserves to spare. The jet was operated by the FAB until the mid-1960s, when it was replaced by the F-80C and TF-33A, which were later replaced by the MB-326, Mirage III and Northrop F-5 jets.

During events involving the Lobster War, between 1961 and 1964, the Brazilian Air Force played an important role in monitoring and patrolling the large area of litigation with France, making its B-17 squadrons available for observation and photo-reconnaissance of French vessels close to Brazilian coast, in addition to using its most modern anti-submarine warfare means, such as the S-2 Tracker and P-2V Neptune.

Having been given authority over all national military aircraft since 1941, from her commissioning in 1961 to 1999 the Brazilian Air Force flew the S-2 Trackers of the aircraft carrier Minas Gerais while from 1965 naval aviation flew its own helicopters. Now naval aviation is also authorized to fly its own fixed wing carrier based aircraft.

=== Cold War ===
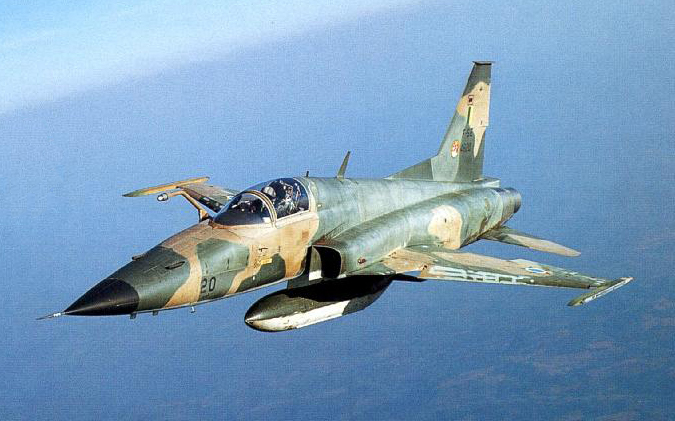
A F-5E from the 1st Fighter Aviation Group

During the Cold War, the then Brazilian military government was aligned with the United States and NATO. This meant that the Northrop F-5 could be bought cheaply from the United States, which called this jet the "Freedom Fighter". Many other countries, such as Mexico, also benefited from this policy. But Brazil did not buy the F-5A Freedom Fighter, instead buying the F-5 Tiger II years later.

In the middle of the Cold War, between 1970 and 1974, the Brazilian Air Force used its attack aircraft to bomb camps of internal Maoist guerrilla groups in the regions of the Vale do Ribeira and in the Araguaia River, attacking targets inside the jungles, using North American T-6 attack planes and Douglas B-26 Invader bombers armed with napalm.

In 1977 the Brazilian Air Force conducted Operation Saucer regarding alleged UFO sightings in the city of Colares, Pará State. The objects observed in the military records received the nickname of luminous bodies and were associated with phenomena reported by residents and authorities, reported by the local press, which reported alleged attacks on the civilian population. The operation was terminated after 4 months, and other related missions were carried out during 1978 by the National Intelligence Service. The Operation's documentary collection comprises hundreds of pages of documents, such as reports, photographic images and footage.

On April 9, 1982, the Brazilian Air Force showed its ability to guarantee Brazilian sovereignty. In the midst of the Falklands War, on a rainy Good Friday night, the radar system detected a lyushin II-62M, registration number CU-T1225, Soviet-made and belonging to Cubana, a Cuban state company about 300 km away from Brasilia. Two F-103E Mirage III fighters from the 1st Air Defense Group (1st GDA), based at Anápolis Air Base, took off at around 9:00 pm to carry out the mission to protect Brazilian airspace. Under the guidance of the ground control, the two F-103Es positioned themselves next to the Cuban invader. It was then that, from the Military Operations Center, Major José Orlando Bellon said on the radio, in English: "You were intercepted. There are two combat aircraft at your side. The order is to land in Brasilia immediately ". Under the surveillance of Brazilian fighters, they made a landing at Brasilia International Airport at 10:12 pm.

On June 3, 1982, two F-5E Tiger II fighters from the 1st Fighter Aviation Group, based at the Santa Cruz Air Force Base - Rio de Janeiro, intercepted an Royal Air Force Avro Vulcan that had technical problems when returning from a mission during the Falklands War in the South Atlantic Ocean off the coast of Rio de Janeiro. The aircraft was temporarily detained in Brazil.

A Brazilian Mirage IIIE of the 1st Air Defense Group

On May 19, 1986, a series of radar and visual contacts with unidentified flying objects (UFOs) took place across the Brazilian states of São Paulo, Rio de Janeiro, Minas Gerais and Goiás, the Santa Cruz Air Force Base was put on alert due to the presence of several unidentified radar plots around São José dos Campos. Around half an hour later, Anápolis Air Force Base reports the detection of radar echoes at radial 270 of its VOR, prompting the air base to also be put on alert. During the events of that night, 2 Northrop F-5 and 3 Dassault Mirage III fighters were activated in an attempt to intercept dozens of UFOs over the four Brazilian states. The Minister of the Air Force, Brigadier Lt. of the Air Octávio Júlio Moreira Lima granted a press conference on the 23rd of May along with the fighter pilots, confirming the events of the 19th and stating, "It's not about believing or not [in aliens]. We can only give out technical information. There are several hypotheses. Technically, I'd tell you gentlemen that we have no explanation."

The Embraer (Empresa Brasileira de Aeronáutica, Brazilian Aeronautic Co.) company has its origins as an enterprise directly managed and sponsored by the FAB. Working with Italian corporations, it developed the new AMX attack aircraft (known locally as the A-1) which makes up the backbone of the FAB's attack force. The successful Tucano T-27 trainer and the new A-29 light attack aircraft are also Embraer types used extensively by the FAB.

During Operation Traira, in February 1991, six AT-27 Tucanos were used for close air support against a group of 40 rebels from the Revolutionary Armed Forces of Colombia), which had seized a Brazilian military detachment.

=== Post Cold War ===
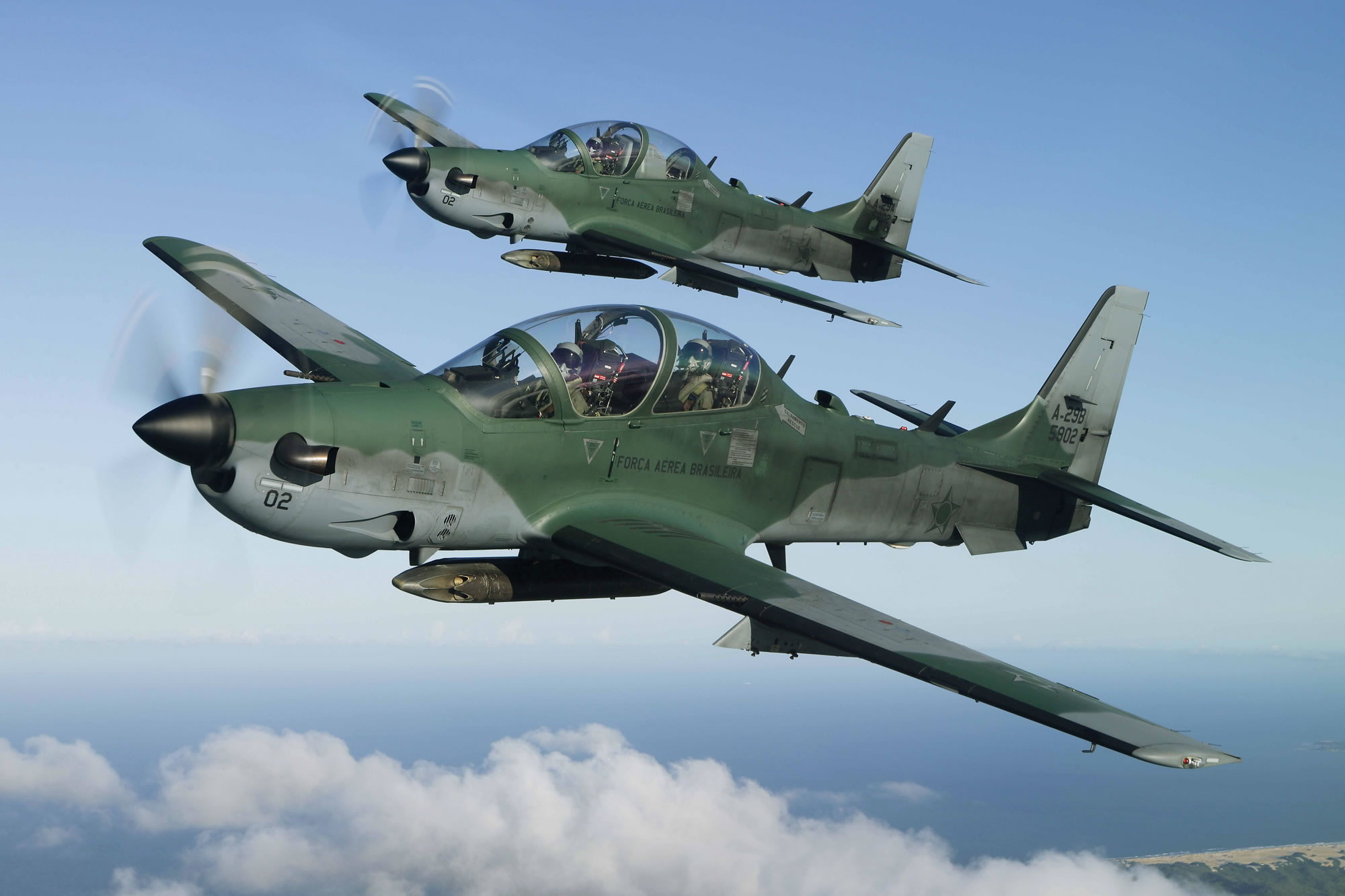
A pair of EMB-314 Super Tucanos

In October, 2002, the Brazilian Air Force used six A-1 AMX fighter bombers to destroy clandestine airstrips used by the narcotics traffickers in the interior of the Amazon rainforest near the border with Suriname. The operation also had support from the Brazilian Army and Brazilian Federal Police with many drug dealers being arrested as a result. The AMX Bomber/Fighter was the primary plane used.

On November 21, 2008, F-5E Tiger II fighter jets from the 1st Fighter Aviation Group based at the Santa Cruz Air Force Base intercepted a civilian cargo Douglas DC-8 from a private company in Ghana as it entered the Brazilian airspace, off the coast of Cabo Frio, littoral of Rio de Janeiro. The aircraft was escorted by the Brazilian F-5s to the Galeão Air Force Base.

On 3 June 2009, two Brazilian Air Force A-29 Super Tucanos, guided by an Embraer R-99, intercepted a Cessna U206G engaged in drug trafficking activities. Inbound from Bolivia, the Cessna was intercepted in the region of Alta Floresta d'Oeste, and after exhausting all procedures, one of the Super Tucanos fired a warning shot from its 12.7 mm machine guns, after which the aircraft followed the Super Tucanos to Cacoal airport.

In 2010, the FAB worked on the Search & Rescue mission of Air France Flight 447. The Brazilian Air Force has started a search and rescue from the Brazilian archipelago of Fernando de Noronha, sending eight planes to search a stretch bounded by the coastal cities of Recife, Natal and the archipelago of Fernando de Noronha.

On March 12, 2012, during the Operation Agata 4, the Brazilian Air Force used two A-29 Super Tucano to destroy a clandestine runway used by drug traffickers within the Amazon rainforest.

In 2011–2013, Operation Agatha marks the start of a new decade of the twenty-first century with the consolidation of the Amazon Surveillance System (SIVAM), an intricate network of radars, meteorological sensors, digital satellite communications, and advanced air-traffic-control software, among other technological innovations available to Brazilian Military personnel. The Brazilian Air Force (FAB), which deployed new tactics and methods of fighting using RQ-450 remote-controlled aircraft. Operating in conjunction with E-99 Guardian planes, they assist with locating objectives for A-29 Super Tucano fighters flying in darkness. Northrop F-5EM fighters, responsible for providing air superiority.

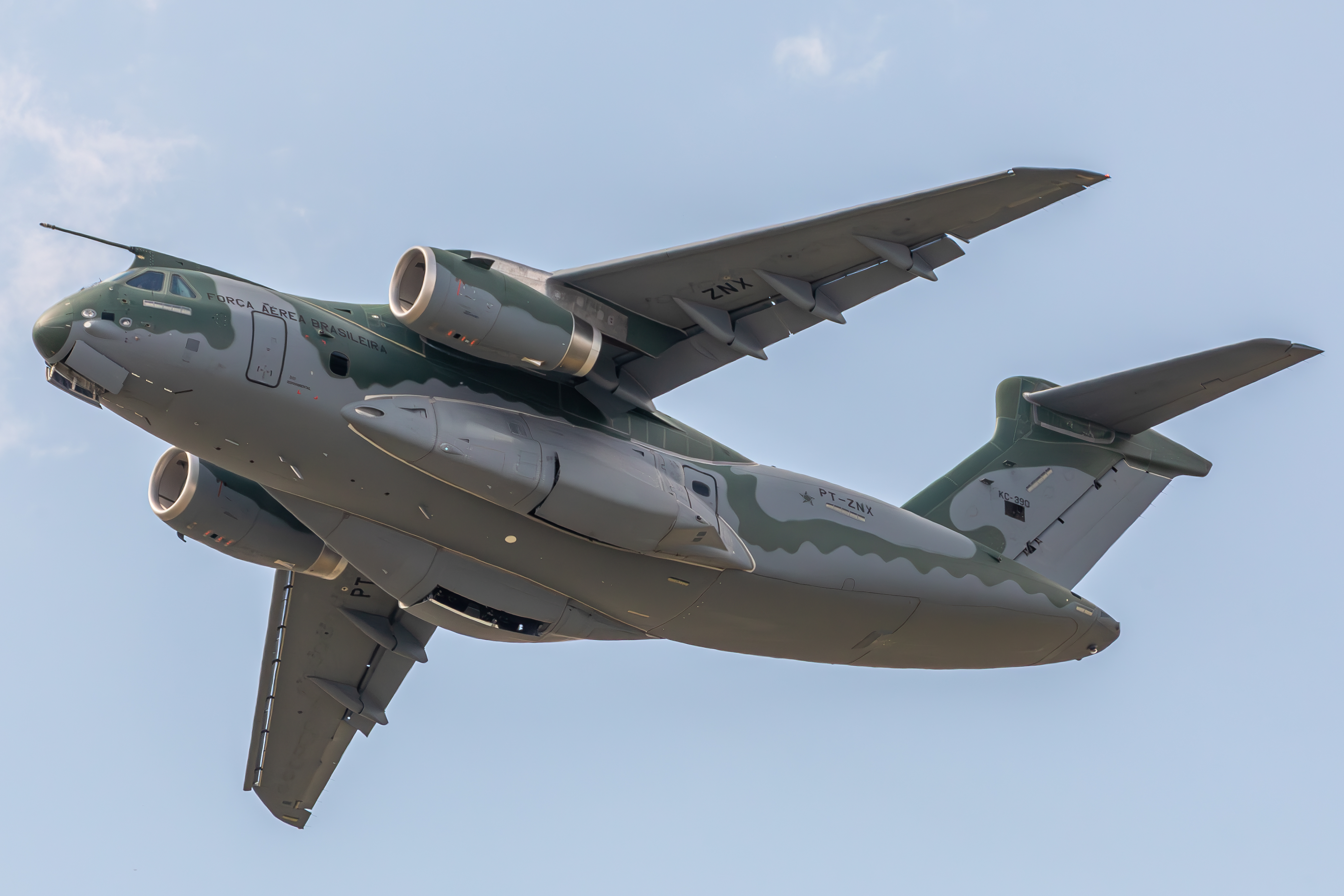
The Embraer KC-390, performing at the Paris Air Show

In July 2016, Defense Aerospace Brazilian command displays participation of Brazilian Air Force at the Olympic Games Rio 2016, there will be over 15,000 military and 80 aircraft involved in the Olympics. To defense missions and aerial patrol 32 fighters (Northrop F-5M and A-29 Super Tucano), for aerial warning missions 2 radar aircraft (Embraer R-99), surveillance missions 3 Unmanned aircraft (Hermes 450 and Hermes 900), for maritime patrol missions 1 (P-3 Orion), for logistical support missions (Boeing C-767, C-130 and C-295), 15 helicopters (Mil Mi-35, UH-60 Black Hawk and EC-725).

Between 2004 and 2017, the FAB worked on the United Nations Stabilization Mission in Haiti (MINUSTAH) supporting the United Nations force (a joint Brazilian, Uruguayan, Chilean and Argentine force) deployed there. FAB planes transported an estimated sixty four thousand passengers and six thousand tons of cargo.

In November 2017, while searching for the missing Argentine Submarine ARA San Juan, the Brazilian Air Force sent a C-295M search and rescue aircraft and a P-3AM Orion anti-submarine warfare aircraft to assist in the international search effort.

In January 2021, in the middle of the second wave of the COVID-19 pandemic, the Brazilian city of Manaus, located in the interior of the amazon rainforest, was left with an overburdened medical service needing medical supplies and transferring patients, a major operation was set up by Brazilian air force, mobilizing all its available transport aviation, aircraft C-130, KC-390, C-97 Brasilia, C-95M Bandeirantes, CASA C-105 and C-99 were deployed for the largest aeromedical evacuation operation in Brazilian aviation military history.

In October 2023, during the Israel-Gaza war, the Brazilian Air Force together with the Brazilian government mounted its largest repatriation operation of nationals in a conflict zone in history, employing 6 aircraft (2 Airbus A330 MRTT, 2 Embraer C-390 Millennium and 2 Embraer Lineage 1000) to rescue more than 2,700 people from the conflict zone between Hamas and Israel.

=== Exercises ===
The Cruzex air force exercises are the most important of its type in South America. They are hosted every 2 years by the Brazilian Air Force. Issues and participants:

- Cruzex I 2002: South Region – Argentina, Brazil, France, Chile – participation of 90 aircraft
- Cruzex II 2004: Northeast Region – Argentina, Brazil, France, Venezuela – participation of 92 aircraft
- Cruzex III 2006: Central-West Region – Argentina, Brazil, France, Chile, Uruguay, Venezuela – participation of 104 aircraft
- Cruzex IV 2008: Northeast Region – Brazil, Chile, France, Uruguay, Venezuela – participation of 100 aircraft
- Cruzex V 2010: Northeast Region – Brazil, Chile, France, Uruguay, United States – participation of 97 aircraft
- Cruzex VI 2012: Northeast Region – Argentina, Brazil, Canada, Chile, Ecuador, France, Peru, Uruguay, Venezuela, Sweden, United Kingdom, United States – personnel only, no aircraft
- Cruzex Flight 2013: Northeast Region – Brazil, Canada, Colombia, Chile, Ecuador, Uruguay, Venezuela, United States – participation of 96 aircraft
- Cruzex Flight 2018: Northeast Region – Brazil, Canada, Chile, France, Peru, Uruguay, United States – participation of 100 aircraft
- Cruzex 2024: Northeast Region – Brazil, Argentina, Colombia, Chile, Peru, Paraguay, Portugal, United States - Participation 90 aircraft

=== Future of the Air Force ===
The Air Force has a large number of active and planned projects, under the modernization plans of the Brazilian Armed Forces, defined in the National Defense White Paper.

== Inventory ==
=== Developments ===
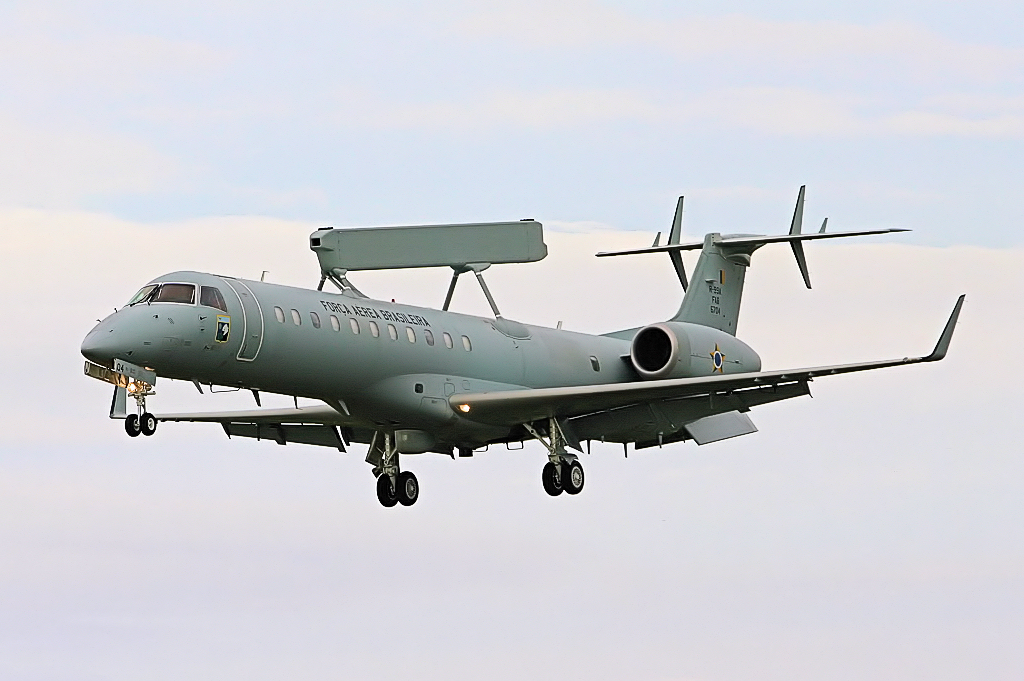
The E99 AEW&C platform

In the early 2000s, with renewed economic stability, the FAB underwent an extensive renewal of its inventory through several acquisition programs, the most ambitious of which was the acquisition of 36 new front-line interceptor aircraft to replace the aged Mirage III in the FABs inventory. Known in the late 1990s as the F-X Project, the program was postponed during the presidential mandate of Fernando Henrique Cardoso, who in the end of 2002 left the decision for his successor, Luís Inácio ‘Lula’ da Silva, who postponed it again in 2003 and 2004. It was cancelled in 2005.

On July 15, 2005, one agreement was set with the French government for the transfer of twelve Dassault Mirage 2000s (ten "C" and two "B" versions) second-hand ex-Armée de L'Air. Known as F-2000s in Brazil, the first two aircraft arrived at Anápolis Air Base on September 4, 2006.

In 2007, Brazilian Air Force's Institute for Advanced Studies started development for the 14-X, a hypersonic scramjet prototype envisaged to fly at 30 km (98,425ft) of altitude at 3 km/s (6,710 mph), corresponding to Mach number 10. In March 2012 a Mach 7 variation has been suggested, named as 14-X S.

In 2006, the F-X Project was restarted under a new name: "F-X2 Project", starting with a bigger budget than its predecessor. The competitors for acquisition were the Eurofighter Typhoon, Sukhoi Su-35, Gripen NG, Dassault Rafale, Boeing F/A-18E/F Super Hornet and, although information on Lockheed Martin's F-35 Lightning II was requested, Lockheed Martin presented an F-16 Fighting Falcon variant (designated F-16BR). In October 2008, FAB released a shortlist of 3 aircraft: Saab Gripen NG, Dassault Rafale and Boeing F/A-18E/F Super Hornet. In February 2009, the three companies provided their final bids. In September 2009, following a surprise French visit to Brazil, Brazilian President Luiz Inácio Lula da Silva and Nicolas Sarkozy, from France, made a new military cooperation agreement. Lula, on an interview at TV5 Monde, said French Rafale was a step forward, as technology transfer would be effective.

On September 7, 2009, Brazilian Independence Day, it was announced Brazil would negotiate 36 Dassault Rafale. But the Defence Minister did not confirm the final decision.

On January 5, 2010, after lobbying by Air Force Officers and Commanders, it was reported that the final evaluation report by the Brazilian Air Force placed the Saab Gripen NG ahead of the other contenders. The decisive factor was apparently the overall cost of the new fighters, both in terms of unit cost, and operating and maintenance costs, and the personal preference of the test pilots. Rafale was reported not to be even the second choice. It was announced in February 2011 that the decision would be further delayed due to budget cuts. And that July the decision was put off for yet another six-month extension.

However, in 2013, yet another six-month delay was announced. In early June 2013, after a visit from US Vice President Joe Biden with Brazilian President Dilma Rousseff; Biden assured President Rousseff that the US Congress would approve technology transfer for Boeing's F-18s.

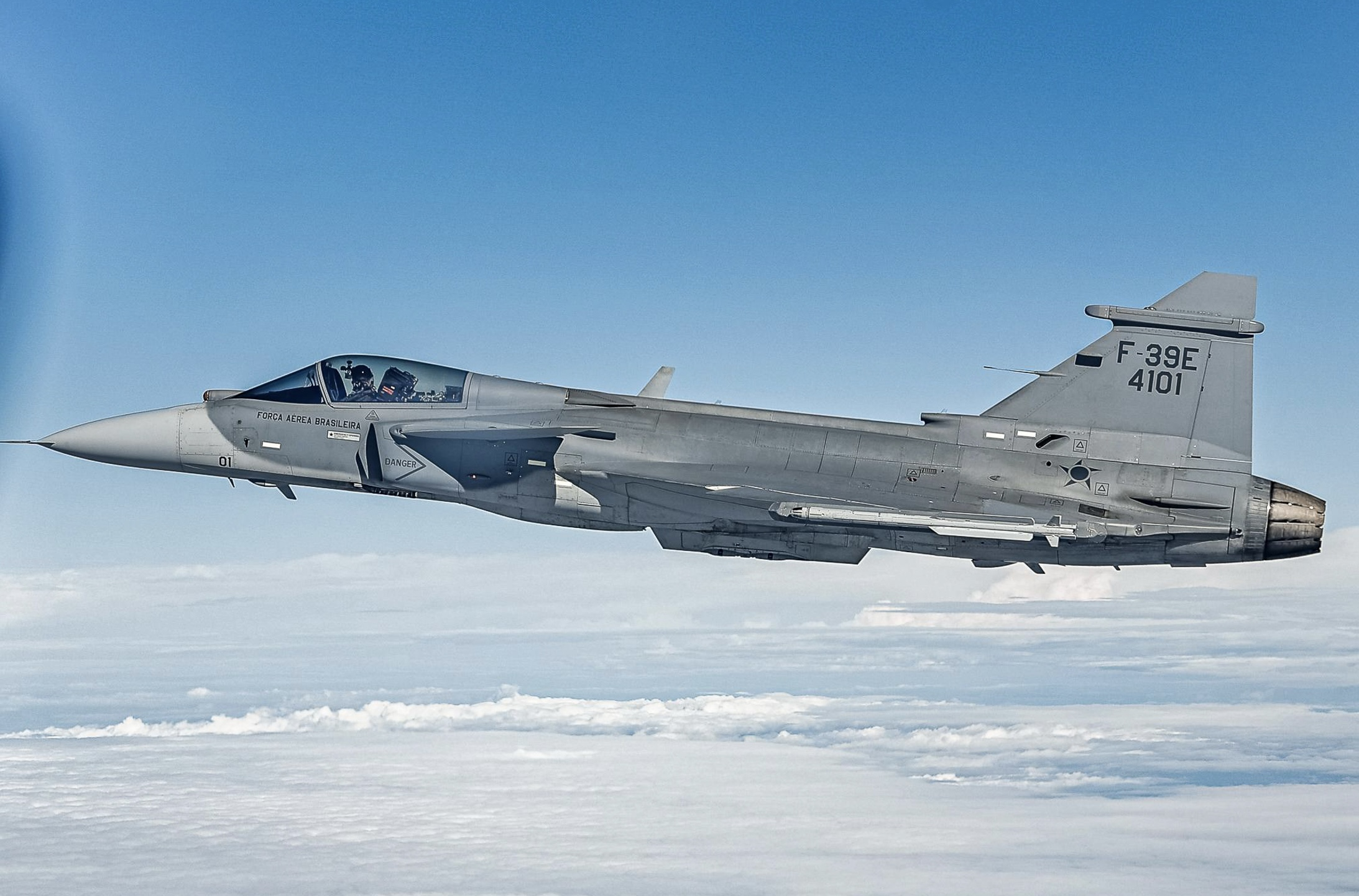
F-39E Gripen multirole jet

In a move apparently following the NSA spying scandal, Russia has also offered Brazil a stake in the development of the Sukhoi PAK-FA 5th generation jet fighter with complete stealth technology transfer.

Saab won the competition on 18 December 2013. The change away from the American jet was due to the 2013 Global surveillance disclosure, according to Reuters reporting; other sources agree with the official rationale that the decision was due to cost and technological transfer. As of January 2014, Brazil is in negotiations with Saab to lease current model Gripens while they wait four years for the next generation jets on order to be developed and built.

On July 28, 2015, the Brazilian government met with a Swedish trading commission to revisit the contract and request a low of 2.58% in interest rates to 1.98% per annum, generating a savings of 1 billion dollars in 25 years. Sweden rejected the application and signing the contract is seriously threatened with limit until October 2015. On July 29, 2015, the Brazilian government confirmed that it had reached an agreement with Sweden to finance the purchase of a batch of 36 Gripen NG.

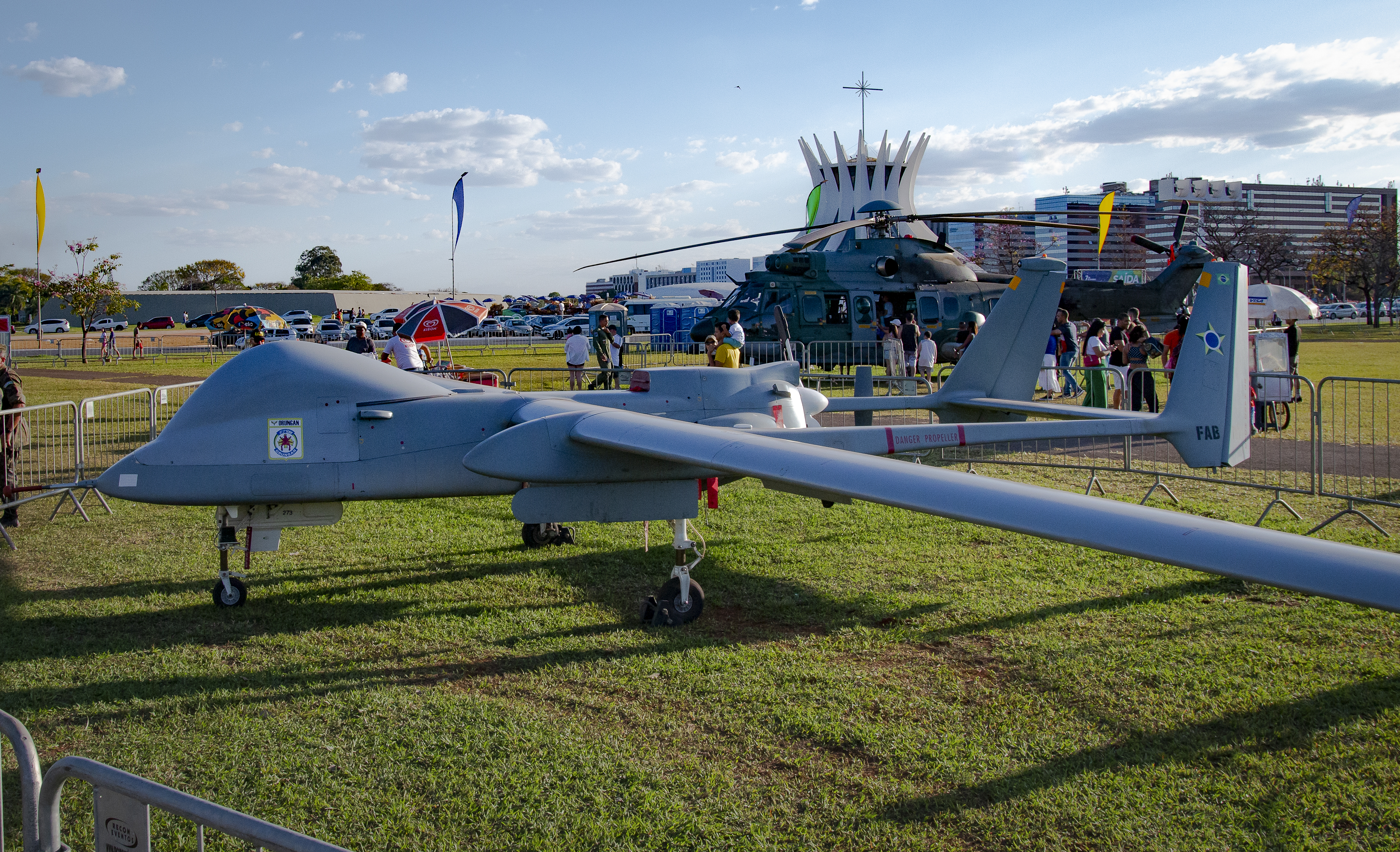
The patrol UAV IAI Heron in Brazilian Air Force

In September 2015 Brazil finalized the US$4.68 billion purchase of 36 Saab Gripen E fighters to be delivered between 2019 and 2024. An assembly line is being established in Brazil to build 15 of the aircraft with engineers and technicians from Brazil traveling to Sweden to begin training. Saab officials have said they believe this is just an initial order, with potential for additional sales to other Latin American countries.

=== Helicopter aerial refueling ===
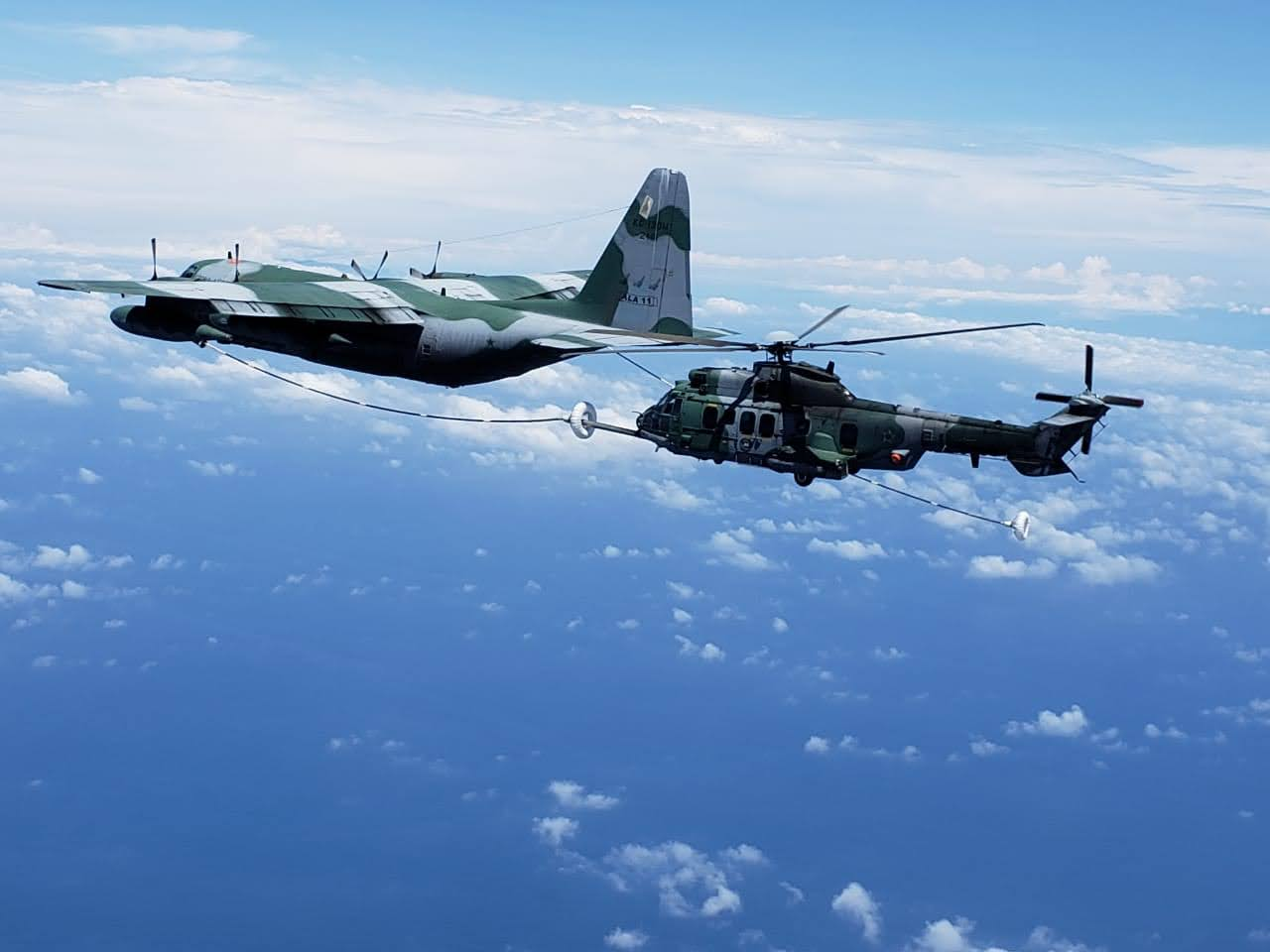
KC-130 Hercules of the "Squadron Fast" and H-36 Caracal helicopters from "squadrons Falcon" met to perform the REVO procedure.

In November 2020 the Brazilian Air Force (FAB), through a technical and multidisciplinary team coordinated by the Department of Aerospace Science and Technology, concluded, on October 30, in Rio de Janeiro, the last phase of the inflight refueling tests campaign between the H-36 Caracal helicopter and the KC-130 Hercules aircraft.

The flights took place in a restricted area under military control, on the coast of Rio de Janeiro, where the refueling aircraft KC-130 Hercules of the Squadron Gordo ( "fat", 1st / 1st GT) and H-36 Caracal helicopters from squadrons Falcão ( "Falcon" 1st / 8th GAV) and Puma (3rd / 8th GAV) met to perform the REVO procedure.

The Campaign aimed to complete the tasks foreseen in the certification process, including the unprecedented steps of transferring fuel from the KC-130 to the H-36 and the simultaneous refueling of two helicopters.

As a result, Brazil becomes the first country in South America with the ability to refuel helicopters in flight, a historic landmark for Brazilian Air Force and Brazil.

=== Datalink ===
The Link-BR2 is a datalink developed by the Air Force and the Brazilian defence company AEL Sistemas, this technology allow the exchange of data such radar information, videos and images with other units of the three branches anytime and anywhere, using an advanced encrypted protocol with a high degree of security.

== Structure ==
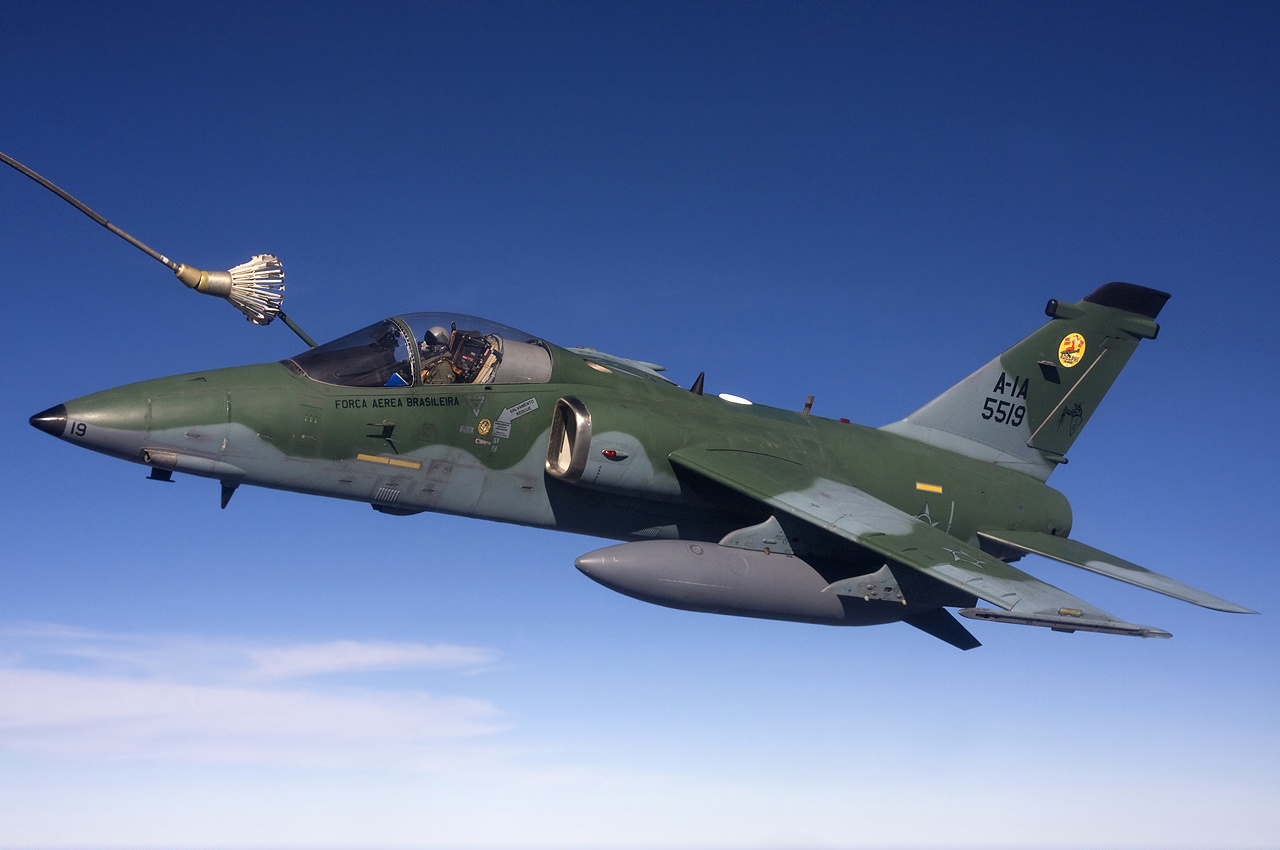
An AMX conducting air-to-air refueling

The Brazilian Air Force is the aerospace branch of the Brazilian armed forces and is managed by the "Aeronautics Command" (Comando da Aeronáutica – COMAER). The COMAER was created in 1999 and is assigned as service branch of the Armed Forces as part of the Ministry of Defense (Ministério da Defesa).

The COMAER is the department of the Air Force, the successor of the former Ministry of Aeronautics, when it was absorbed into the Ministry of Defence. The department is led by the "Aeronautics Commander" (Comandante da Aeronáutica). The Commander is the most senior Air Force rank (Tenente-Brigadeiro-do-Ar), is appointed by the President, and reports directly to the Minister of Defense. The COMAER includes the Air Force Staff (Estado-Maior da Aeronáutica (EMAER)). The COMAER is in charge of seven major organization bodies, which comprise the FAB.

Readiness Command (Comando de Preparo (COMPREP)) is the successor of the former General Command of Air Operations (Comando-Geral de Operações Aéreas – COMGAR). It is headquartered in Brasília, DF and commands most of the air force's flying units, responsible for their operational training and readiness.

Aerospace Operations Command (Comando de Operações Aeroespaciais (COMAE)) succeeded the Brazilian Aerospace Defence Command (Comando de Defesa Aeroespacial Brasileiro (COMDABRA)), also headquartered in Brasília, DF. It is responsible for the constant surveillance and security of the country's aerospace and takes over operational command of the COMPREP's units.

General Command for Support (Comando-Geral de Apoio (COMGAP)) is in charge of aircraft and infrastructure maintenance and logistics. It is headquartered in São Paulo, SP.

General Command for Personnel (Comando-Geral de Pessoal (COMGEP)) is in charge of personnel development, training, medicine and documentation. HQ is in Brasília, DF.

Aerospace Control Department (Departamento de Controle do Espaço Aéreo (DECEA)) is in charge of air defence, air traffic control (both civil and military), control and communications, meteorology, cartography and enforcement of civil air traffic regulations. HQ is at Rio de Janeiro - Santos Dumont IAP, RJ.

Science and Aerospace Technology Department (Departamento de Ciência e Tecnologia Aeroespacial (DCTA)) is in charge of technology development, project management and industry relations with the private sector. HQ is at São José dos Campos IAP, SP.

Economy, Finance and Administration Secretariate (Secretaria de Economia, Finanças e Administração da Aeronáutica (SEFA)) is headquartered in Brasília, DF.

There are also seven "Regional Air Commands" (Comandos Aéreos Regionais – COMAR). The four former operational air forces were specialised into advanced flying training (I. Air Force), maritime patrol and helicopters (II. Air Force), combat aviation (III. Air Force) and air transport (V. Air Force). The seven regional air force commands were specialised into land-based operational support, air force infrastructure maintenance and support to the civilian population. Each region had a single air transport squadron as its only flying unit. Beginning 2016, the Air Force's flying operations were merged into the Air Force Readiness Command (AFRC), which was organized into 12 wings and the 1st Air Defense Brigade. The four air forces were disbanded and their flying squadrons were re-assigned to the air bases, which in turn were subordinated to the air force regions, giving them operational tasks.

=== Air units organization ===
At unit levels, "Groups" (Grupos) usually consist of one to sixteen consecutively numbered "Squadrons" (Esquadrões), each with varying numbers of aircraft, usually from six to 12. Smaller formations are known as "Flights" (Esquadrilhas). According to its tasks, a group has one of the following designations:

- Air Defense Group: Grupo de Defesa Aérea (GDA): Air defense fighters. (Fighter Jets)
- Transport Group: Grupo de Transporte (GT): Transport, Flight refueling
- Aviation Group: Grupo de Aviação (GAv): Fighter, attack, reconnaissance, SAR, rotary wing
- Fighter Aviation Group: Grupo de Aviação de Caça (GAvCa): Fighter, attack planes
- Troop Transport Group: Grupo de Transporte de Tropas (GTT): Transports, troop carrying, parachutist drop
- Special Flight Inspection Group: Grupo Especial de Inspeção em Vôo (GEIV): Calibration
- Special Test Flights Group: Grupo Especial de Ensaios de Vôo (GEEV): Test flights
- Special Transport Group: Grupo de Transporte Especial (GTE): VIP transport

Common used designations for squadrons are:

- Air Transport Squadron: Esquadrão de Transporte Aéreo (ETA)
- Air Training Squadron: Esquadrão de Instrução Aérea (EIA)
- Demonstration flying team: Esquadrão de Demonstração Aérea (EDA) (also called Esquadrilha da Fumaça)
Air units of the Brazilian Air Force:
F-39E & F F-5EM & FM A1-A & B A-29A & B AT-27

A330 MRTT KC-390 C-130M C-105 P-3AM R-99M & E-99M
AH-2 UH-60L EC725

VIP Transport

The Military Units of the Brazilian Air Force are:

Location	State	ICAO	CODE	Air Base
Anápolis	Goiás	SBAN	ALA2	Anápolis Air Force Base
Belém	Pará	SBBE	ALA9	Belém Air Force Base
Boa Vista	Roraima	SBBV	ALA7	Boa Vista Air Force Base
Brasília	Federal District	SBBR	ALA1	Brasília Air Force Base
Campo Grande	Mato Grosso do Sul	SBCG	ALA5	Campo Grande Air Force Base
Canoas	Rio Grande do Sul	SBCO	ALA3	Canoas Air Force Base
Florianópolis	Santa Catarina	SBFL	BAFL	Florianópolis Air Force Base
Fortaleza	Ceará	SBFZ	BAFZ	Fortaleza Air Force Base
Guarulhos	São Paulo	SBGR	BASP	São Paulo Air Force Base
Manaus	Amazonas	SBMN	ALA8	Manaus Air Force Base
Natal	Rio Grande do Norte	SBNT	ALA10	Natal Air Force Base
Porto Velho	Rondônia	SBPV	ALA6	Porto Velho Air Force Base
Recife	Pernambuco	SBRF	BARF	Recife Air Force Base
Rio de Janeiro	Rio de Janeiro	SBGL	ALA11	Galeão Air Force Base
Rio de Janeiro	Rio de Janeiro	SBSC	ALA12	Santa Cruz Air Force Base
Rio de Janeiro	Rio de Janeiro	SBAF	BAAF	Afonsos Air Force Base
Salvador	Bahia	SBSV	BASV	Salvador Air Force Base
Santa Maria	Rio Grande do Sul	SBSM	ALA4	Santa Maria Air Force Base
Santos	São Paulo	SBST	BAST	Santos Air Force Base
Caravelas	Bahia	SBCV	DESTAE-CV	Caravelas Air Force Detachment
Macapá	Amapá	SBMQ	DESTAE-MQ	Macapá Air Force Detachment
São Gabriel da Cachoeira	Amazonas	SBUA	DASG	São Gabriel da Cachoeira Air Force Detachment
Guaratinguetá	São Paulo		EEAR	School for Aeronautics Specialists
Pirassununga	São Paulo	SBYS	AFA	Brazilian Air Force Academy
Novo Progresso	Pará	SBCC		Brigadeiro Velloso Testing Range Air Base

=== Airspace Control Department ===
Air Traffic Control in Brazil is militarised and under the Air Force. This is a legacy from the time when each of the three armed serviced was under its own government ministry and the corresponding Ministério da Aeronáutica (MAER) was in charge of both the FAB and civil aviation. The Airspace Control Department (Departamento de Controle do Espaço Aéreo (DECEA)) was established in 1942 and due to the civil-military character of the former Ministry of Aeronautics it developed into a heterogenous service tasked with air force communications, operations command and control, civil air traffic control, aerial navigation systems calibration and meteorology, even including a disciplinary council for violations of airspace directives.

Airspace Control Department (Departamento de Controle do Espaço Aéreo (DECEA)) - Rio de Janeiro - Santos Dumont Airport, RJ (co-located with the 3rd Air Force Region Command)

- Airspace Control System Implementation Committee (Comissão de Implantação do Sistema de Controle do Espaço Aéreo (CISCEA)) - Rio de Janeiro - Santos Dumont Airport, RJ
- Air Movement Management Center (Centro de Gerenciamento da Navegação Aérea (CGNA)) - Rio de Janeiro - Santos Dumont Airport, RJ
- 1st Integrated Air Defence and Air Traffic Control Center (1º Centro Integrado de Defesa Aérea e Controle de Tráfego Aéreo (CINDACTA I)) - Brasília Air Force Base, DF (co-located with the Air Force Readiness Command (COMPREP))
- 2nd Integrated Air Defence and Air Traffic Control Center (2º Centro Integrado de Defesa Aérea e Controle de Tráfego Aéreo (CINDACTA II)) - Bacacheri Airport, Curitiba, PR
- 3rd Integrated Air Defence and Air Traffic Control Center (3º Centro Integrado de Defesa Aérea e Controle de Tráfego Aéreo (CINDACTA III)) - Recife Air Force Base, PE
- 4th Integrated Air Defence and Air Traffic Control Center (4º Centro Integrado de Defesa Aérea e Controle de Tráfego Aéreo (CINDACTA IV)) - Manaus, AM
- Southeast Regional Airspace Control Center (Centro Regional de Controle do Espaço Aéreo Sudeste (CRCEA-SE)) - São Paulo–Congonhas Airport, SP - responsible for the cluster of the country's busiest airports in the Rio de Janeiro - São Paulo area.
- Brazilian Aeronautical Technical [Support] Mission in Bolivia (Missão Técnica Aeronáutica Brasileira na Bolívia (MTAB-Bolívia)) - Jorge Wilstermann IAP, Cochabamba, Bolivia - providing technical assistance for the implementation of a CINDACTA-type integrated system for the whole Bolivian airspace.
- 1st Communications and Control Group (1º Grupo de Comunicações e Controle (1º GCC)) - Galeão Air Force Base, Rio de Janeiro, RJ
  - 1st Communications Squadron (1º Esquadrão de Comunicação (1º/1º GCC)) - Santa Cruz Air Force Base, Rio de Janeiro, RJ - the Air Force's main communication hub.
  - 2nd Early Warning, Command and Control Squadron (2º Esquadrão de Controle e Alarme (2º/1º GCC)) - Canoas Air Force Base, Canoas, RS
  - 4th Early Warning, Command and Control Squadron (4º Esquadrão de Controle e Alarme (4º/1º GCC)) - Santa Maria Air Force Base, Santa Maria, RS
  - 3rd Control Squadron (3º Esquadrão de Controle (3º/1º GCC)) - Natal Air Force Base, Natal, RN - equipped with terminal and precision approach radars.
  - 5th Control Squadron (5º Esquadrão de Controle (5º/1º GCC)) - Porto Velho Air Force Base, Porto Velho, RO - equipped with terminal and precision approach radars.
- Air Force Electronic Materiel Park Rio de Janeiro (Parque de Material de Eletrônica da Aeronáutica do Rio de Janeiro (PAME-RJ)) - Rio de Janeiro, RJ - maintenance facility for ground radar equipment.
- Airspace Control Institute (Instituto de Controle do Espaço Aéreo (ICEA)) - São José dos Campos IAP, SP - training institute for air traffic control personnel.
- Integrated Center for Aeronautics Meteorology (Centro Integrado de Meteorologia Aeronáutica (CIMAER)) - Galeão Air Force Base, Rio de Janeiro, RJ
- Air Force Institute for Cartography (Instituto de Cartografia da Aeronáutica (ICA)) - Rio de Janeiro - Santos Dumont Airport, RJ
- Disciplinary Council of Aeronautics (Junta de Julgamento da Aeronáutica (JJAer)) - Rio de Janeiro - Santos Dumont Airport, RJ
- Special Air Group for Flight Control Systems Inspection (Grupo Especial de Inspeção em Voo (GEIV)) - Rio de Janeiro - Santos Dumont Airport, RJ - the Department's sole flying unit, operating specially-modified Embraer Legacy 500 flight laboratory aircraft.

=== Brazilian Air Force Infantry ===
The Air Force Security Groups, which replaced the Air Force Infantry Battalions in 2018–21, are composed of Air Force Police Companies, Air Force Base Defense Squadrons, Firefighting Companies and Quick Reaction Companies, in addition, they are organized into:

- Group HQ and HQ Squadron
- Supply and Logistics Squadron
- Enlisted Training Section
- Mobilization and National Service Squadron
- Training Squadron
- Guard of Honor Squadron

The Esquadrão Aeroterrestre de Salvamento, known as Para-SAR, although it is operationally subordinated to the Readiness Command's 5th Wing, and its subordinate flights, are also part of the Air Force Infantry.

Destined to the protection of the air force bases and other terrestrial installation, the air defense forces also manned by the Air Force Infantry. At FAB, there are three groups, each stationed in the air bases in Canoas, Manaus and Anápolis.

The Fire Fighting Service, whether be in the Air Force Command or in air bases, is responsible for maintaining the safety of the various military airfields, shared or not, as well as the buildings of interest of this command. Follows international standards of protection to the flight, having like the Central Organ of its management, the Direction of Aeronautical Engineering. The military and civilians belonging to this sector are properly qualified professionals and have the need to be continuously alert for the prompt attendance of aeronautical emergencies, which according to ICAO rules have only 3 minutes to attend an aeronautical emergency that occurs in the area Of the aerodrome.

Formed in 1941 with the formation of the Air Force the Air Force Infantry is organized on a regional basis with units stationed in air bases all over Brazil.

=== Airborne Rescue Squadron (PARA-SAR) ===
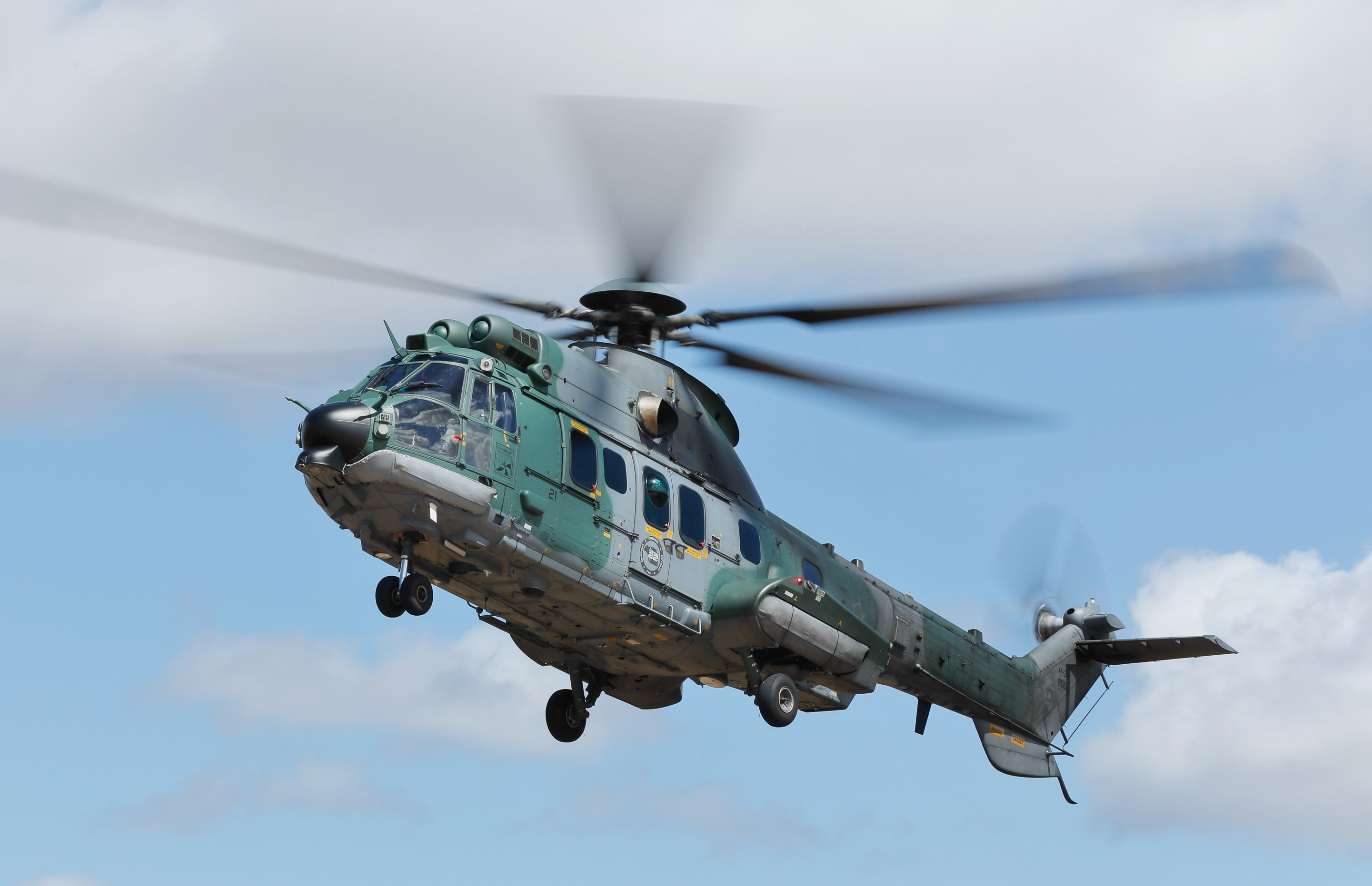
A CSAR EC 725 helicopter

The Esquadrão Aeroterrestre de Salvamento (EAS) (English: Airborne Rescue Squadron), known by its nickname Para-SAR, is a Brazilian Air Force airborne search and rescue squadron, based in the city of Rio de Janeiro. The unit has seven SAR teams located in seven states. Each Para-SAR detachment is made up of SAR qualified military parachutists. Members of this unit can be distinguished by their maroon berets and orange baseball caps.

The Brazilian Air Force has a long history of parachute training. In 1943, at the former Alfonsos Field School of Aeronautics and with the support of the Air Force, cadet gymnastics instructor Achile Garcia Charles Astor first introduced civil parachute training in Brazil.

Seeing the usefulness of having a parachuting unit, the Electronics and Flight Protection Administration conducted studies to see how such a unit could be created under the auspices of the air force. The results of that study gave rise to the Para-SAR.

In 1946, the Brazilian Army formed its parachute school, the now-named General Penha Brazil Parachutist's Instruction Center. It graduated its first class of Brazilian Air Force students in 1959.

== Ranks ==
=== Commissioned officer ranks ===
The rank insignia of commissioned officers.

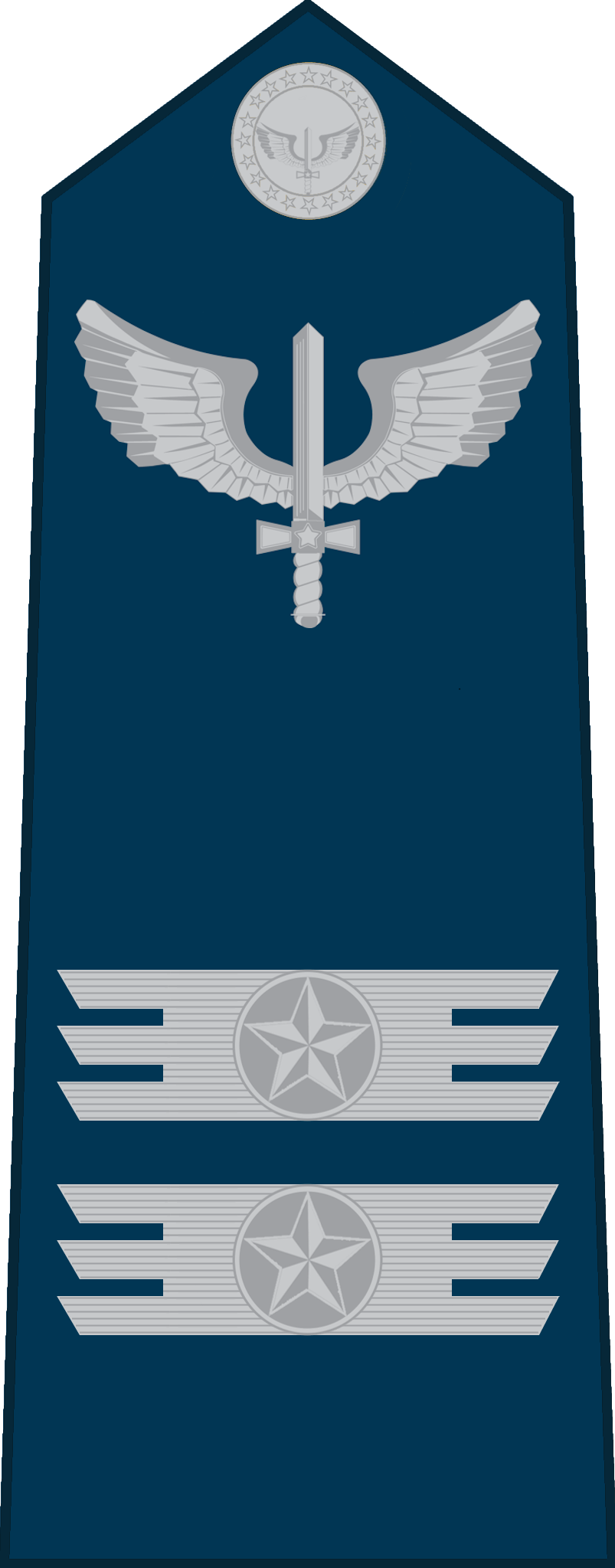
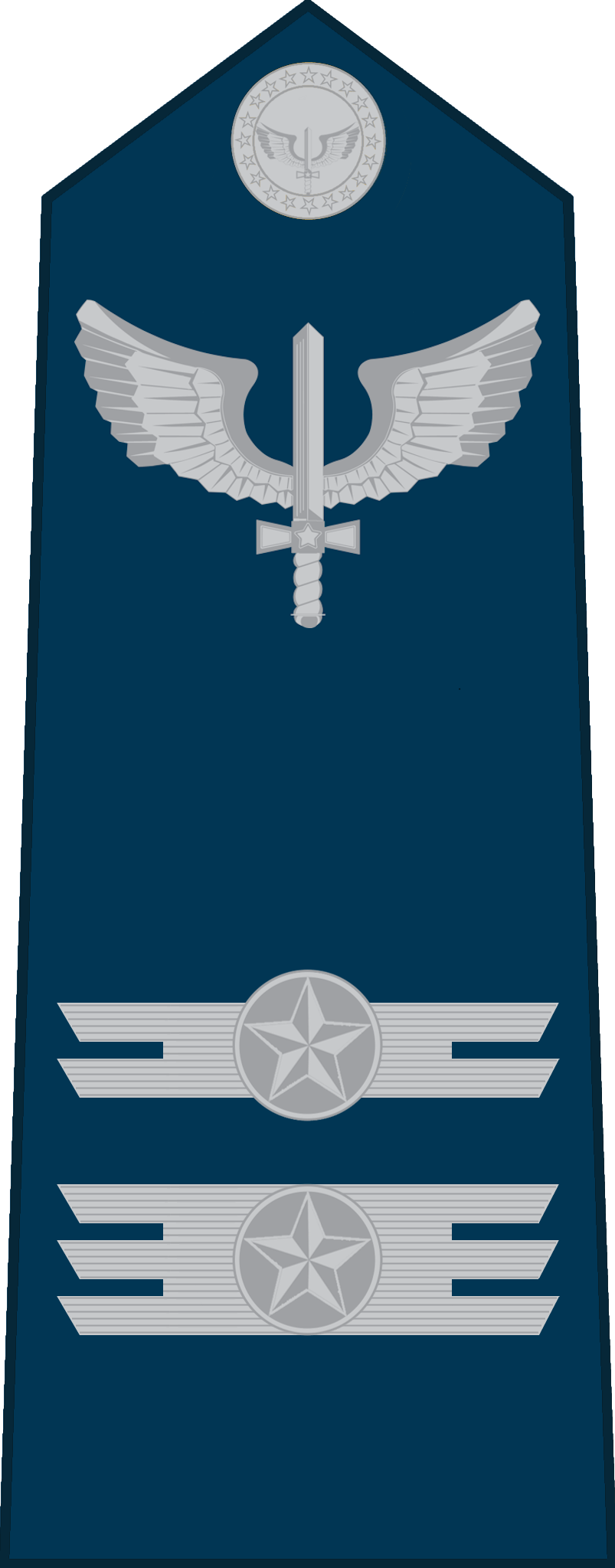
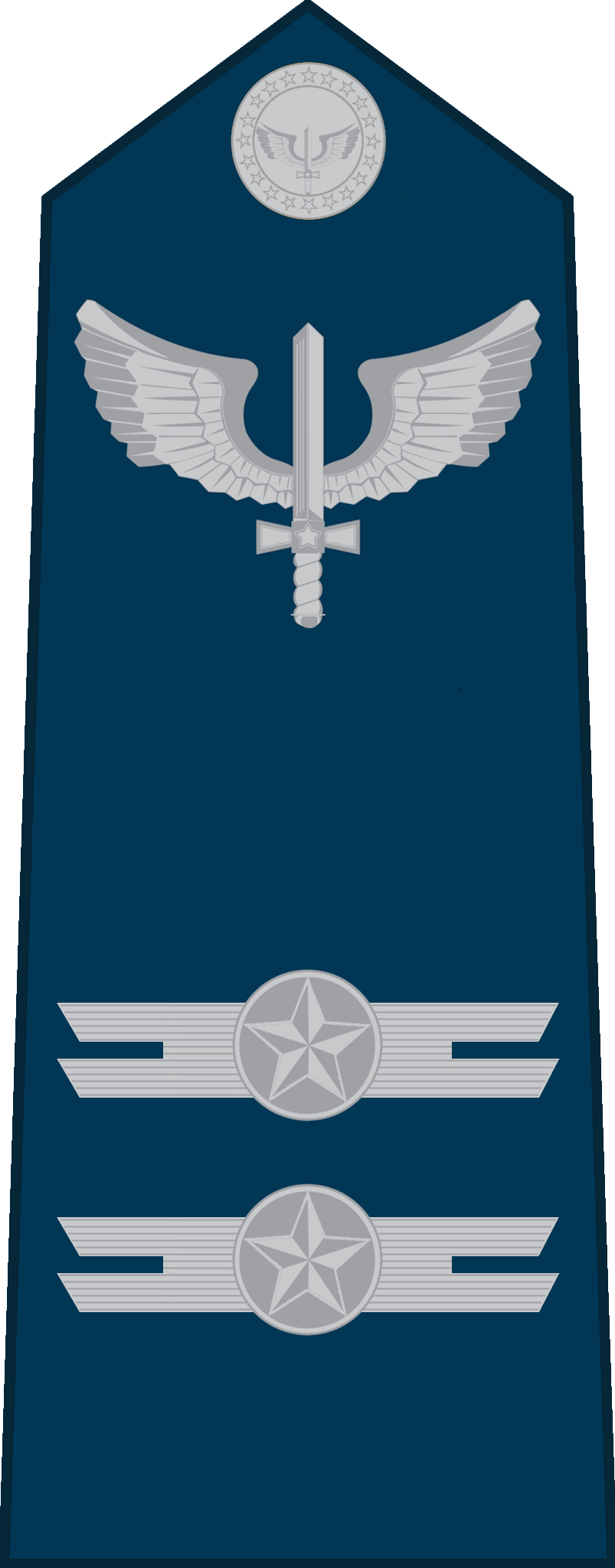
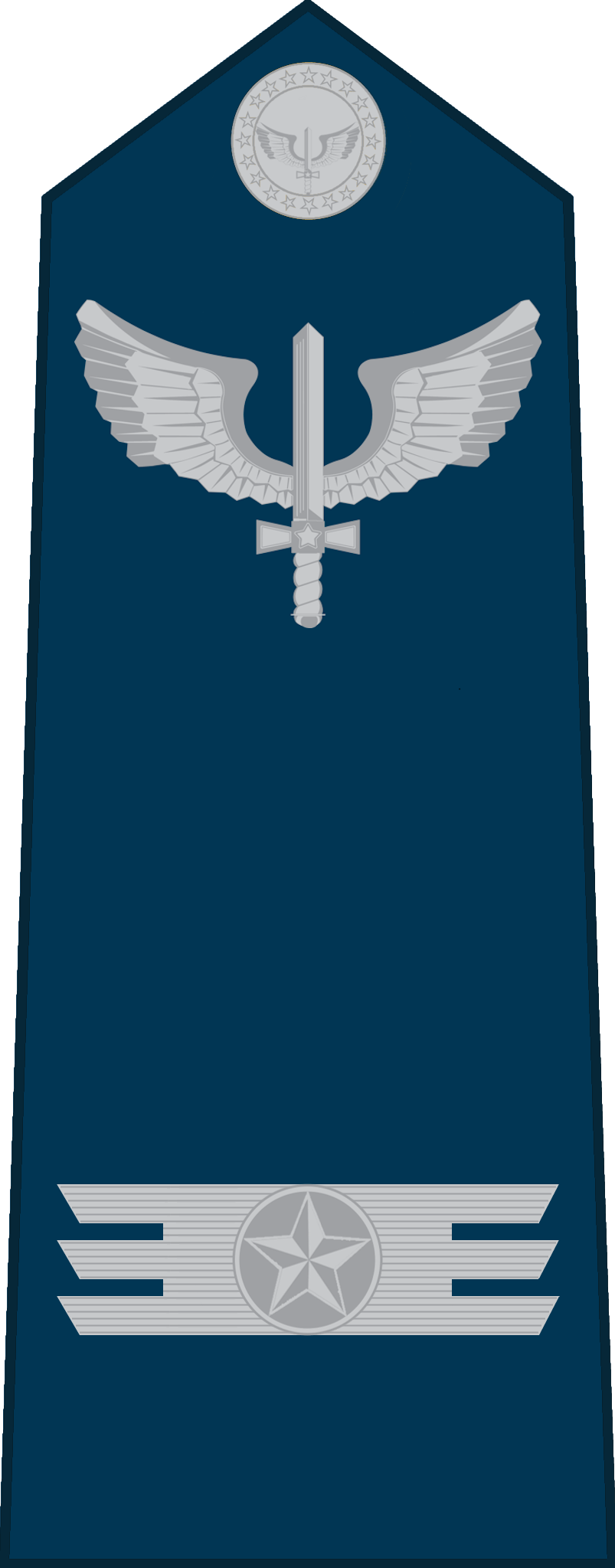
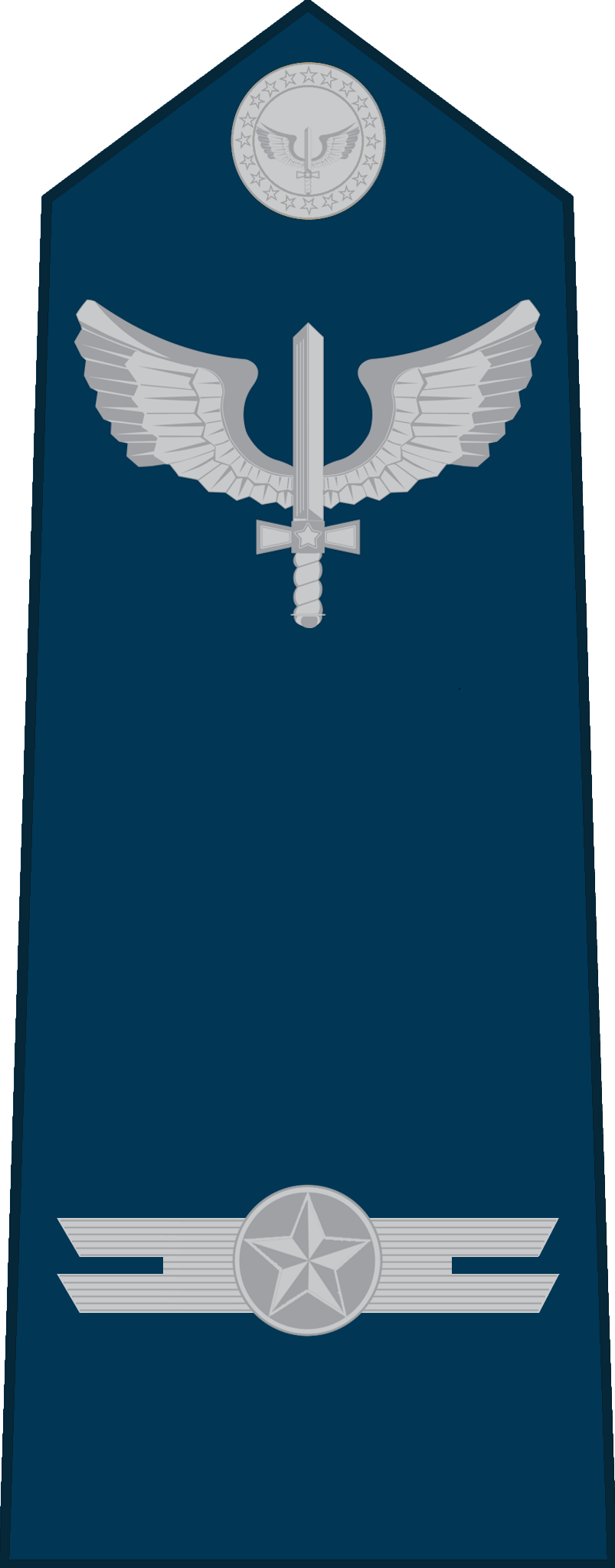
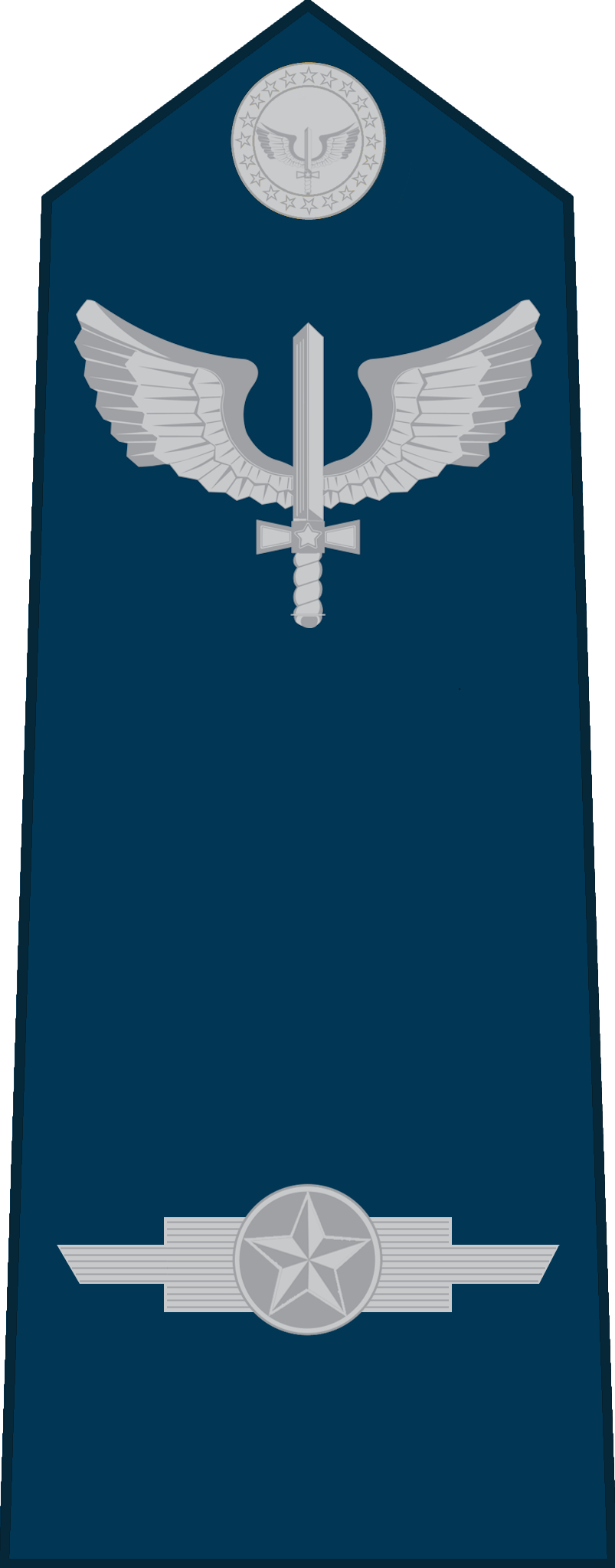
Rank group	General / flag officers				Senior officers			Junior officers
Brazilian Air Force
Brazilian Air Force	Marechal-do-ar	Tenente-brigadeiro do Ar	Major-brigadeiro	Brigadeiro	Coronel	Tenente-coronel	Major	Capitão	Primeiro-tenente	Segundo-tenente

=== Other ranks ===
The rank insignia of Brazilian non-commissioned officers and enlisted personnel.

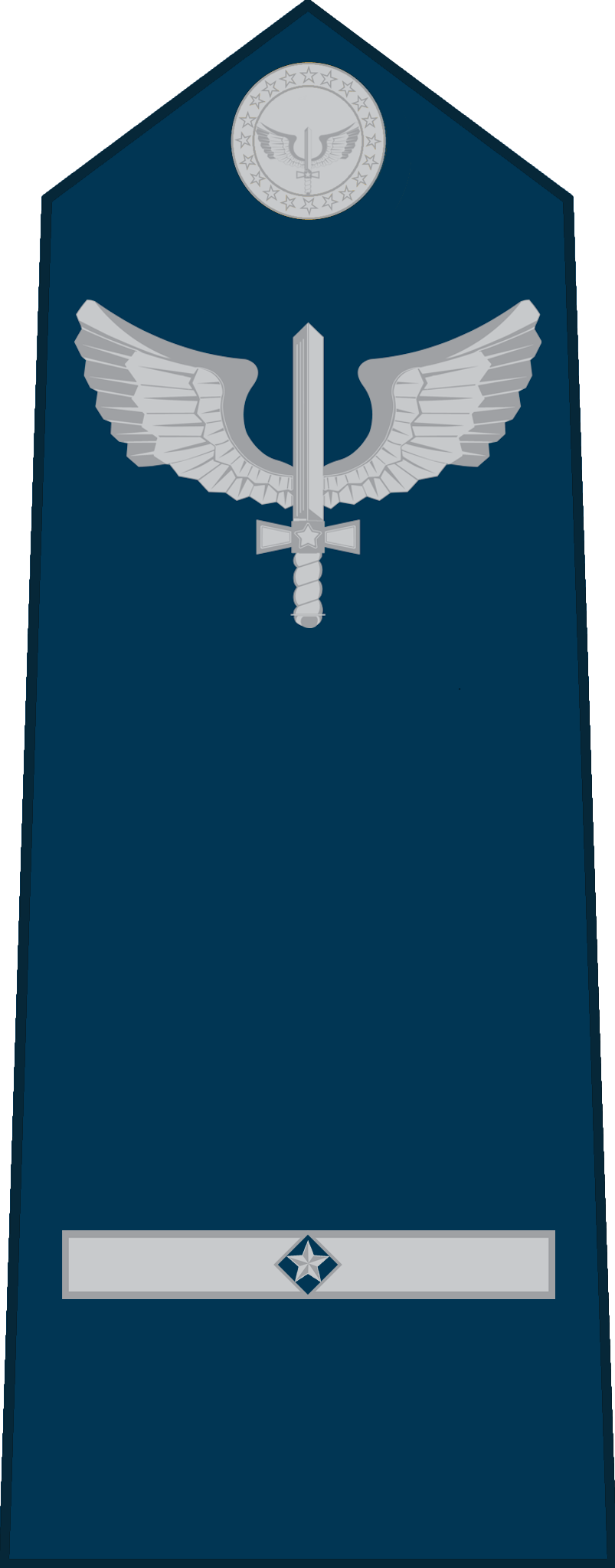
Rank group	Senior NCOs				Junior NCOs		Enlisted
Brazilian Air Force
Brazilian Air Force	Suboficial	Primeiro-Sargento	Segundo-Sargento	Terceiro-Sargento	Cabo	Taifeiro-mor	Soldado	Taifeiro primeira classe	Soldado segunda classe	Taifeiro segunda classe

== See also ==
- Academia da Força Aérea
- Aerial Demonstration Squadron
- Alberto Torres
- Brazil and weapons of mass destruction
- Brazilian Army
- Brazilian Army Aviation Command
- Brazilian Naval Aviation
- Brazilian Navy
- Military history of Brazil
- Military ranks of Brazil
- Rui Moreira Lima

== Bibliography ==
- Hackett, James, ed. (2010-02-03), The Military Balance, London: International Institute for Strategic Studies, Routledge, ISBN 978-1-85743-557-3
- Hagedorn, Daniel P. (September–October 1996). "Talkback". Air Enthusiast (65): 80. ISSN 0143-5450.
- Neto, Ricardo Bonalume (March–April 1999). "'Ugly Ducklings' and the 'Forgotten Division': Brazilian Piper L-4s in Italy, 1944–1945, Part One". Air Enthusiast (80): 36–40. ISSN 0143-5450.
- Neto, Ricardo Bonalume (May–June 1999). "'Ugly Ducklings' and the 'Forgotten Division': Brazilian Piper L-4s in Italy, 1944–1945, Part Two". Air Enthusiast (81): 73–77. ISSN 0143-5450.
