= Convair Model 48 Charger =

Prototype light attack and observation aircraft built 1964

Charger
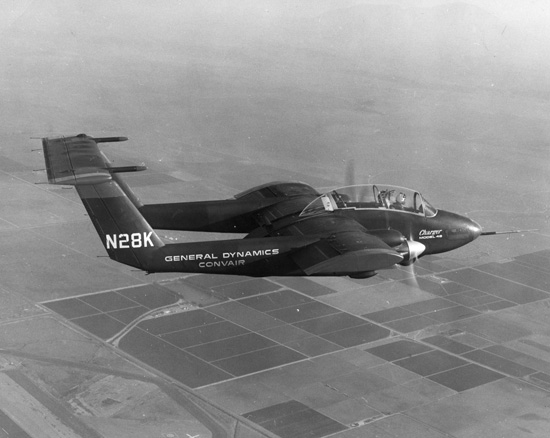

General information
- Type: Light attack and observation aircraft
- National origin: United States
- Manufacturer: Convair
- Status: Prototype
- Number built: 1

History
- First flight: 25 November 1964

The Convair Model 48 Charger was a prototype light attack and observation aircraft of the 1960s, developed to meet a requirement for a dedicated counter-insurgency (COIN) aircraft. It was a two-seat, twin-boom aircraft powered by two turboprop engines which lost out to the North American Rockwell OV-10 Bronco of similar layout. Only the single prototype Model 48 was built, and this turned out to be the last complete aircraft constructed by Convair.

== Design and development ==
In 1959, two United States Marine Corps officers developed the concept of a small low cost aircraft capable of providing close air support to the U.S. Marines, capable of operating from roads close to the battlefield, the concept being known as the Light Light Marine Attack Aircraft (L2VMA). As interest in such an aircraft grew, with interest from the US Army for a similar type, the Convair Division of General Dynamics started studies into counter-insurgency aircraft in 1961. In 1963, the various requirements were merged into a tri-service specification for a Light Armed Reconnaissance Aircraft (LARA), to be used not just by the U.S. Marines and Army, but also by the United States Air Force for counter-insurgency and forward air control roles, and to be available for export.

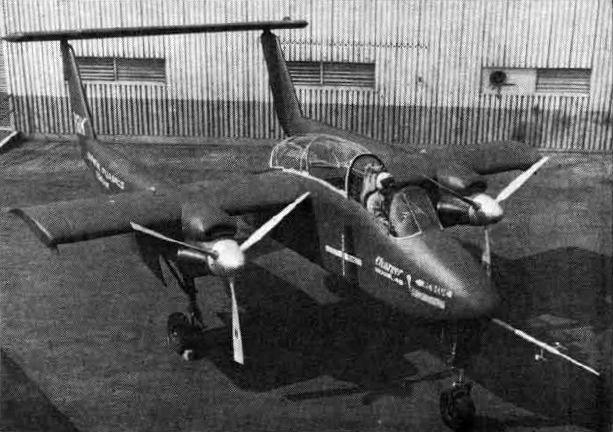
Frontal view of the Convair Model 48 Charger.

The specification produced responses from nine manufacturers, including Convair, who submitted its Model 48 Charger in March 1964. The Model 48 was a twin-boom monoplane, constructed mainly from aluminium, with fiberglass nose, rear fuselage and wingtips, with a retractable nosewheel undercarriage. It was powered by two Pratt & Whitney Canada PT6 (military designation T74), driving three bladed propellers. Its wings were of relatively short (27 ft 6 in/8.38 m) span, which meant that most of the wing was in the slipstream of the propellers, increasing the effectiveness of the full-span trailing-edge slotted flaps and leading edge slats inboard of the engines, which together acted to deflect the slipstream, giving a form of vectored thrust, in order to reduce takeoff and landing distances. The outer trailing-edge flaps doubled as ailerons, which were supplemented by spoilers at low speed. The aircraft was fitted with a large, all-moving tailplane which attached to the vertical fins located at the ends of the tailboom(s), with the tailplane having somewhat greater span (20 ft (6.1 m)) than the distance between the tailbooms.

Pilot and observer sat in tandem under a sliding canopy, while the rear fuselage held a cargo bay with a hinged tail cone capable of carrying 2,000 lb (910 kg) of cargo, which could include a complete PT6 engine, or five paratroopers, in extremely cramped conditions, with a sixth paratrooper in the observer's seat. Four 7.62 mm machine guns were mounted in pods on the side of the fuselage, while 2,000 lb (910 kg) of external stores, including bombs, rockets and gun pods, could be carried on hardpoints under the wings and fuselage. To meet the specification's requirements for amphibious operations, it could be fitted with two large floats.

== Operational history ==
Convair started construction of a prototype as a private venture before a winner of the LARA competition was announced. In August 1964, the US Navy announced North American Aviation's design, the NA-300 (later to become the OV-10 Bronco) as the winner of the LARA competition. The U.S. Marine Corps and U.S. Air Force favored the Charger, however, and protested against the U.S. Navy's decision, and Convair continued construction of their prototype, which made its maiden flight on 25 November 1964.

After initial flight tests, the Charger was modified with an increased wingspan and modified tail to improve low-speed control. The Charger demonstrated excellent STOL capability, taking off over a 50 ft (15 m) obstacle in 485 ft (148 m) with a normal payload. This was better both than the LARA specifications requirement of 800 ft (244 m), and the Bronco.

The Charger was awarded a 100-hour joint service flight test contract where the prototype would be flown by representatives of the U.S. Navy, Marine Corps, Army and Air Force. If orders followed, it was planned to build the production aircraft with a deeper and longer fuselage allowing full dual controls to be fitted. The prototype crashed on its 196th test flight on 19 October 1965, owing to pilot error by its U.S. Navy test pilot, however, and further development was abandoned.

== Specifications (Long-span wings) ==
Data from General Dynamics Aircraft and their Predecessors

General characteristics

- Crew: 2
- Capacity: 6 paratroops in utility/cargo bay
- Length: 34 ft 10 in (10.62 m)
- Wingspan: 30 ft 1 1/4 in (9.18 m)
- Height: 13 ft 7 in (4.14 m)
- Wing area: 216 sq ft (20.1 m^{2})
- Empty weight: 4,457 lb (2,022 kg)
- Gross weight: 10,460 lb (4,745 kg)
- Fuel capacity: 258 US Gallon (977 L) internal
- Powerplant: 2 × Pratt & Whitney Canada T74-CP-8/10 turboprop, 650 hp (480 kW) each
- Propellers: 3-bladed Hamilton Standard, 8 ft 6 in (2.59 m) diameter

Performance

- Maximum speed: 319 mph (513 km/h, 277 kn) at sea level
- Ferry range: 3,000 mi (4,800 km, 2,600 nmi)
- Service ceiling: 21,300 ft (6,500 m)
- Take-off to 50 ft (15 m): Less than 500 ft (152 m)
- Landing from 50 ft (15 m): Less than 500 ft (152 m)

Armament

- Guns: 4 × 7.62mm machine guns
- Hardpoints: 5 with a capacity of 2,000 lb (910 kg) total

== See also ==
Aircraft of comparable role, configuration, and era

- North American Rockwell OV-10 Bronco
- Lockheed CL-760

Related lists

- List of military aircraft of the United States
