= VMO-1 =

Marine Observation Squadron 1
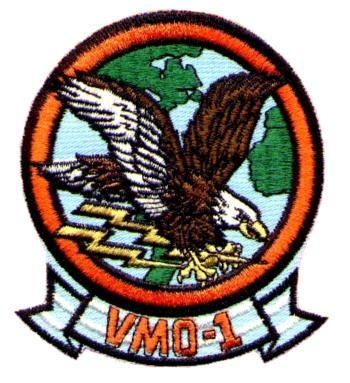
- VMO-1 insignia
- Active: 27 July 1943 – 31 July 1993
- Country: United States
- Branch: USMC
- Type: Observation
- Role: Artillery spotting Aerial reconnaissance
- Garrison/HQ: Inactive
- Nickname(s): Yazoo
- Motto(s): "Can Do"
- Tail Code: ER
- Engagements: World War II * Battle of Guam * Battle of Iwo Jima; Operation Desert Storm

Marine Observation Squadron 1 (VMO-1) was an observation squadron of the United States Marine Corps which saw extensive action during World War II and supported numerous contingencies during the Cold War. The squadron was last based at Marine Corps Air Station New River, North Carolina and saw its final deployment in support of Operation Desert Storm in 1991. The squadron was decommissioned on 31 July 1993.

== History ==
=== World War II ===
Marine Observation Squadron 155 (VMO-155) was commissioned at Marine Corps Air Station Quantico, Virginia on July 27, 1943. In November of that year, the squadron moved out to San Diego, California and on 1 January 1944, they were redesignated Marine Observation Squadron 1 (VMO-1) and deployed to Espiritu Santo. In February 1944, they moved to Guadalcanal and in July they joined the III Amphibious Corps and participated in the Battle of Guam. In February and March 1945, the squadron also participated in the Battle of Iwo Jima.

=== 1946–1980s ===
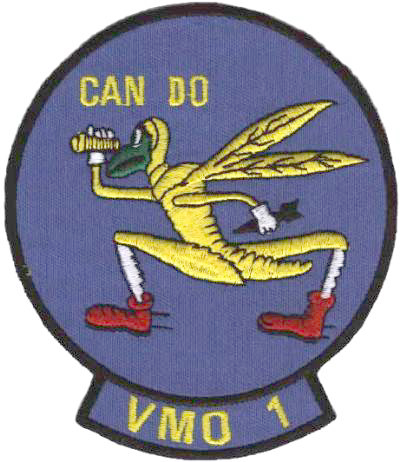
Early squadron insignia.

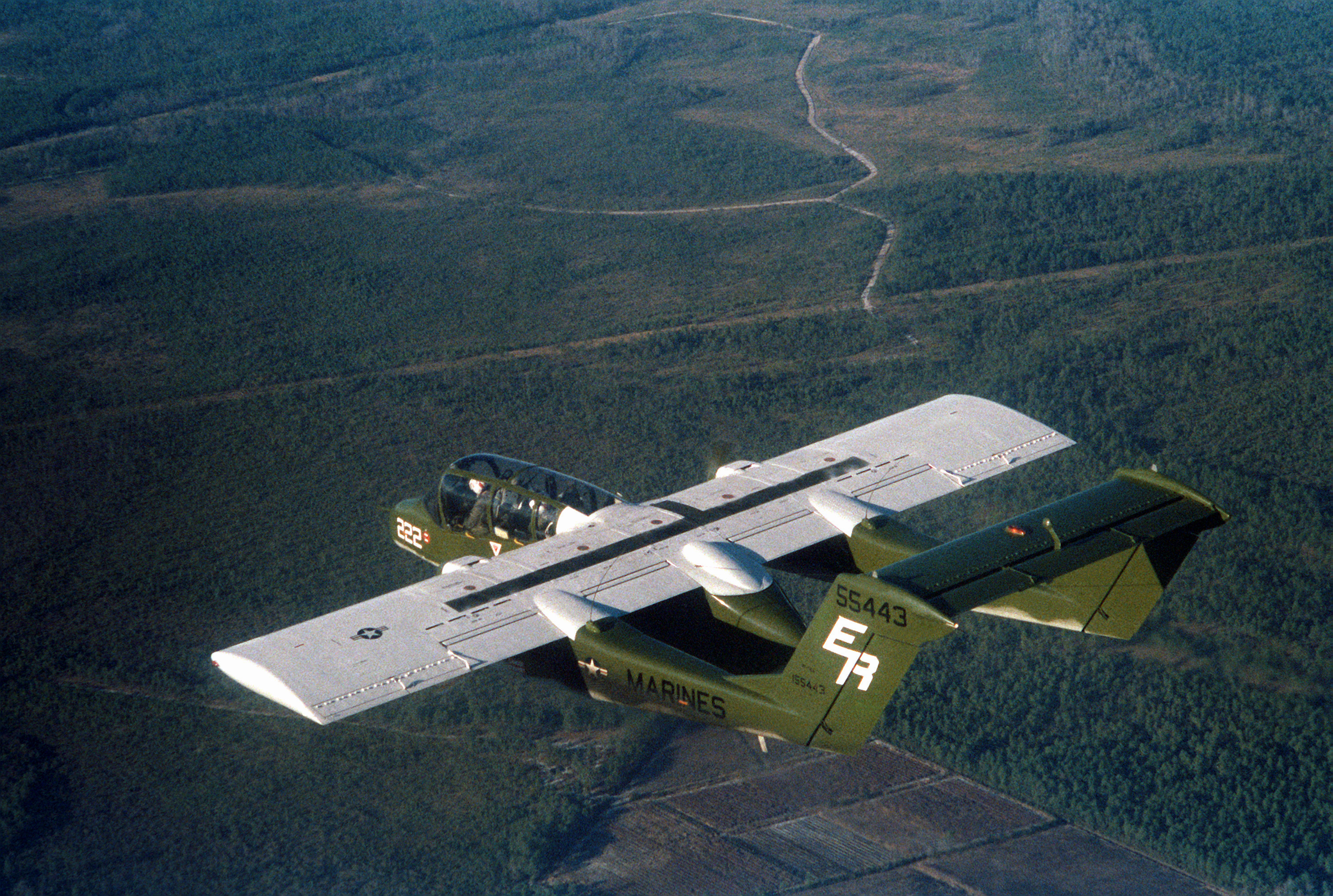
An OV-10A of VMO-1 in 1982.

In January 1946, the squadron moved to Marine Corps Air Station Cherry Point. During the Korean War, they trained replacement pilots for the war and supported operation of the 2nd Marine Division. In 1950, the squadron received eight Cessna OE-1 for light fixed wing operations. In 1952, they moved to Marine Corps Air Station New River and received their first helicopters. The tail code during this time was changed from LR to ER. In 1953 the squadron received the Cessna OE-2. In 1958, the squadron was part of the U.S. 6th Fleet task force that intervened in Lebanon and in 1965 they participated in the U.S. intervention into the Dominican Republic. From 1964 to 1968 the squadron operated without any fixed wing aircraft.

In July 1968, VMO-1 became conversion to the OV-10 Bronco and by 1971 they were an all fixed-wing squadron. During the 1970s and 1980s, the squadron rotated through deployments to Japan and supported exercises throughout Asia, the Mediterranean, the Caribbean and Northern Europe.

In 1974 VMO-1 set a Navy/Marine Corps Maintenance record with 21 of 21 OV-10A aircraft up with all systems go for 21 days in a row. Commanding Officer was Lt.Col. Art Dittmeier. Maintenance Officer was Major John H. Pierson Jr.

On 5 July 1974 VMO-1 Pilot John H. Pierson Jr. and Co-pilot Major David R. Shore set a world straight line non-stop distance record for Class C 1 f Group II (Turboprop) aircraft. The flight covered 2,769.84 miles from Naval Air Station Whidbey Island, in Washington State to Homestead Air Force Base, in Florida. The aircraft was equipped with an internal auxiliary fuel tank in the cargo bay and an Aero 3C external fuel tank which provided total fuel for over 12.5 hours flight time. The original reason for the flight was to demonstrate the OV-10A trans-Atlantic capability which Marine Corps Headquarters staff planners did not recognize at the time.

=== 1990s and deactivation ===
In December 1990, the squadron boarded the USS America and USS Theodore Roosevelt headed for Saudi Arabia to support Operation Desert Shield. When Operation Desert Storm began, the squadron flew over 1000 combat sorties with the loss of 1 aircraft and 1 pilot killed in action. Upon their return, the squadron was deactivated on 31 July 1993.

== Unit awards ==
| Navy Unit Commendation (with one bronze star) |
| Meritorious Unit Commendation |
| Asiatic-Pacific Campaign Medal |
| World War II Victory Medal |
| National Defense Service Medal (with two bronze stars) |
| Armed Forces Expeditionary Medal |
| Southwest Asia Service Medal (with two bronze stars) |

== See also ==
- United States Marine Corps Aviation
- List of United States Marine Corps aircraft squadrons
- List of decommissioned United States Marine Corps aircraft squadrons
