= North American Rockwell OV-10 Bronco =

Observation and light attack aircraft

OV-10 Bronco
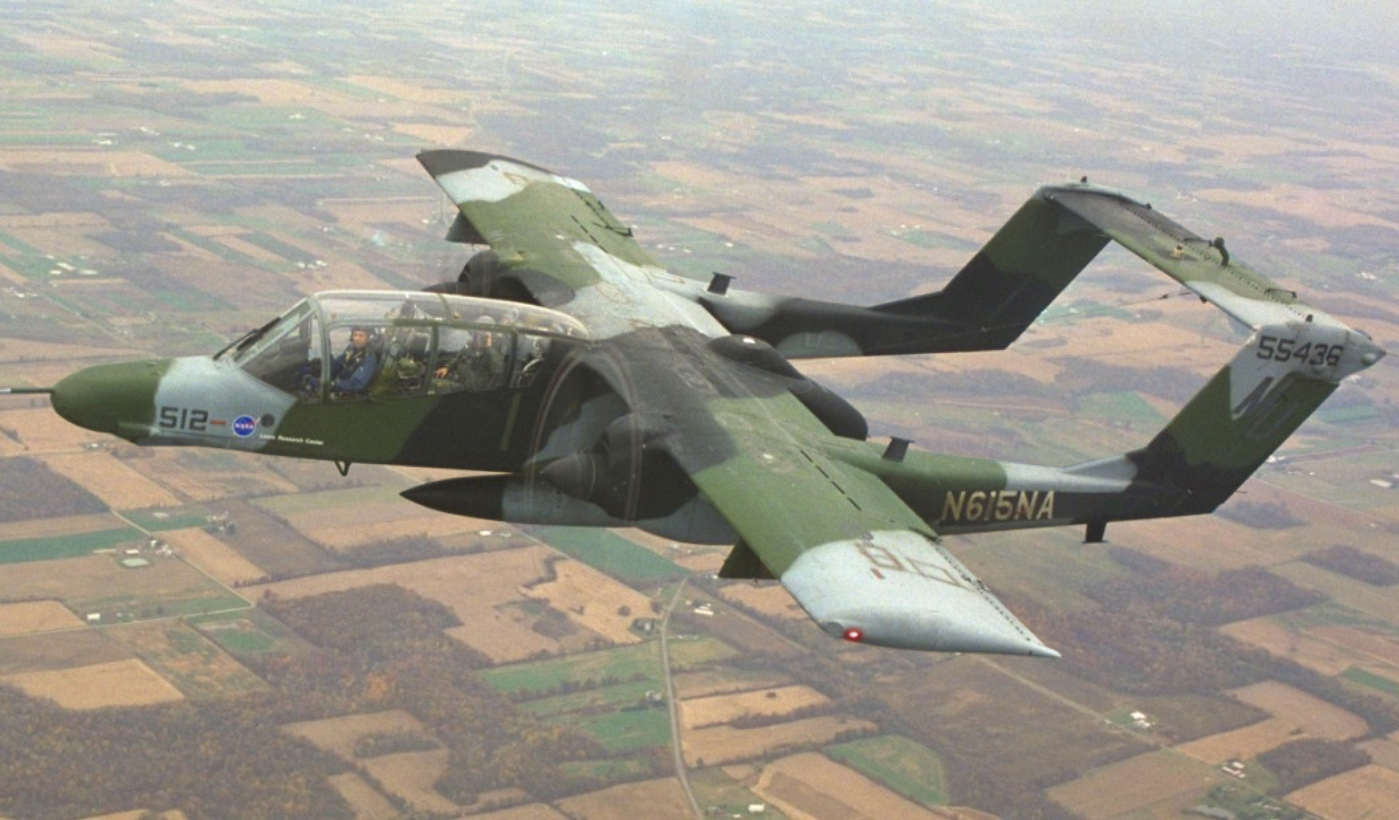
- A NASA OV-10D in 2009

General information
- Type: Light attack and observation aircraft
- National origin: United States
- Manufacturer: North American Rockwell
- Status: In limited service
- Primary users: United States Marine Corps (historical) United States Air Force (historical); United States Navy (historical); Philippine Air Force (historical)
- Number built: 360

History
- Manufactured: 1965–1986
- Introduction date: October 1969
- First flight: 16 July 1965

The North American Rockwell OV-10 Bronco is a twin-turboprop light attack and observation (O) aircraft with short takeoff and landing (V) capability designed and produced by the American aircraft manufacturer North American Rockwell. It was the first aircraft to be specifically designed to conduct counter-insurgency (COIN) and limited war operations.

The OV-10 emerged as a concept during the early 1960s by W.H. Beckett and K.P. Rice, having been originally conceived to be a rugged, simple, close-air-support aircraft integrated with frontline ground operations, suitable for operating from the unimproved surfaces of forward operating bases (FOBs), flying at slow to medium subsonic speeds, and possessing much longer loiter times than a jet aircraft, partially by adopting efficient turboprop engines instead of using jet propulsion or piston engines. It was specifically designed to perform the COIN mission as well as to function as a forward air control (FAC) aircraft. In 1963, the Light Armed Reconnaissance Aircraft (LARA) requirement for such an aircraft was issued; one year later, the NA-300, subsequently designated as the OV-10, was selected. The prototype OV-10 performed its maiden flight on 16 July 1965. Subsequent production aircraft were considerably larger than the prototype due to various late stage requirements, including armor for the crew and engines and an expanded capacity for both armaments and fuel, necessitating longer wings and uprated engines.

The first production OV-10A was delivered in June 1967 and was introduced to service in October 1969. It could carry up to 3,200 lb (1,450 kg) of external munitions and internal loads such as paratroopers or stretchers, and could remain on station for at least three hours. The OV-10 became one of the premier COIN aircraft of the Cold War era, being operated by the United States Air Force (USAF), United States Marine Corps (USMC), and United States Navy (USN). Furthermore, the type was exported and sold to a number of other countries. The first major combat use of the type was the Vietnam War, during which it was used extensively in the FAC role. In the Vietnam theatre alone, 81 OV-10s were lost to a variety of causes; divided by service, the USAF lost 64 aircraft, the USN lost 7, and the USMC lost 10. The USMC's last combat deployment of the OV-10 was during Operation Desert Storm, where the type's slow speed, low-altitude flight, and lack of infrared countermeasures was thought to have made the type more vulnerable to Iraqi anti-aircraft fire.

Following the end of the Cold War in the early 1990s, the type was withdrawn from US military service; the retired aircraft were typically reused for a wide variety of purposes, including numerous export sales to overseas operators. During the 2010s, the USAF briefly resumed operation of the OV-10 for Operation Inherent Resolve, flying combat missions over Iraq and Syria in support of special forces. The Royal Moroccan Air Force have flown their OV10s on COIN operations against Polisario forces in the Western Sahara War. The Indonesian Air Force performed live combat missions with their OV-10s on multiple occasion, such as during the 2003–2004 Indonesian offensive in Aceh to provide air support for airborne landings in Banda Aceh and Takengon. The Philippine Air Force (PAF) has used the type to conduct air strikes against the Moro Islamic Liberation Front as well as during the Battle of Marawi.

== Development ==
=== Background ===
The origins of the OV-10 can be traced back to the late 1950s, at which point several officials within both the United States Air Force (USAF) and United States Marine Corps (USMC) began advocating for a cost-effective fixed wing aircraft that could perform both the forward air control (FAC) role in addition to supporting counter-insurgency (COIN) operations. While jet-powered fighters had proven to be suitable for numerous combat roles, it was becoming increasingly recognised that they were simply too quick to be effectively used as COIN aircraft. Since 1947, this mission had been performed by the Cessna O-1 Bird Dog observation aircraft, but this had proved to be somewhat vulnerable; it was also felt by some figures that helicopters were too slow to be dependable for COIN operations. Around this time, the United States Army had been experimenting with armed helicopters; however, figures within the USMC were skeptical that rotorcraft could carry sufficiently heavy armaments.

The concept for the aircraft has been attributed to an informal collaboration between W.H. Beckett and K.P. Rice of the USMC, who had both flown Vought F4U Corsairs in the late 1940s and later became neighbors in Santa Ana, California. They had observed the trend towards procuring increasingly sophisticated and complex fighters, and noted that the close air support mission was more appropriately performed by durable and slower conventional aircraft that could operate close to ground forces and remain on station for an extended period due to its sufficient endurance. Such an aircraft would be simplistic, relatively easy to maintain, and compatible with operating from austere airstrips and unimproved landing surfaces to permit combat battalions to directly access their own aircraft. Furthermore, Beckett and Rice formulated that a pair of turboprop engines would be the optimum powerplant configuration.

Weapons were to be mounted on the centerline, an arrangement that provided for efficient unranged aiming. Beckett and Rice favored strafing weapons, such as self-loading recoilless rifles, which could deliver aimed explosive shells with less recoil than cannons, and a lower per-round weight than rockets. The airframe was to be designed to avoid the back blast. Beckett and Rice developed a basic platform meeting these requirements, then attempted to build a fiberglass prototype within Rice's garage. Following efforts to promote the concept, the pair garnered a group of enthusiastic supporters within multiple services, although some figures believed that the envisioned aircraft lacked sufficient payload.

Rice states:

The military definition of STOL (500 ft to a 50-ft obstacle) allows takeoff and landing in most of the areas in which limited war might be fought. In addition, the airplane was designed to use roads so that operation would even be possible in jungle areas, where clearings are few and far between. As a result, the wingspan was to be limited to 20 feet and a heavy trailing arm-type landing gear with a tread of 6.5 ft was provided for operation from roads. Float operation was to be feasible ... ...it is quite feasible to design the various components so that it can be disassembled easily and stored in a box that would fit in a 6×6 truck bed together with the equipment needed for re-assembly in the field. It could thus be transported by amphibious shipping and either heli-lifted or driven ashore by a 6×6 truck.

=== Light Armed Reconnaissance Aircraft ===
A tri-service specification for the Light Armed Reconnaissance Aircraft (LARA) was approved by the United States Navy (USN), USAF, and US Army, and was issued in 1963. This requirement was based on a perceived need for a new type of "jungle fighting", versatile, light attack and observation aircraft. Existing observation aircraft, such as the O-1 Bird Dog and Cessna O-2 Skymaster, were perceived as obsolescent, possessing a slow top speed and a limited load capacity for this flexible role. The specification called for a twin-engined, two-man aircraft that could carry at least 2,400 pounds (1,100 kg) of cargo or six paratroopers or stretchers, and be stressed for +8 and −3 g (basic aerobatic ability). It also had to be able to operate from an aircraft carrier, fly at least 350 miles per hour (560 km/h), take off in 800 feet (240 m), and convert to an amphibious version. Various armaments had to be carried, including four 7.62 mm (0.300 in) machine guns with 2,000 rounds, and external weapons including a gun pod with 20 mm (0.79 in) M197 electric cannon, and AIM-9 Sidewinder air-to-air missiles.

In March 1963, eleven proposals were submitted. These included the Grumman Model 134R tandem-seat version of the already fielded US Army's OV-1 Mohawk (the USMC dropped out of the Mohawk program in 1958), Goodyear GA 39, Beechcraft PD-183, Douglas D-855, Convair Model 48 Charger, Helio 1320, Lockheed CL-760, a Martin design, and the North American Aviation/Rockwell NA-300. In August 1964, the NA-300 was selected; two months later, a contract for seven prototype aircraft was issued. Convair protested the decision and built a small-wing prototype of the Model 48 Charger anyway, which first flew on 29 November 1964. The Model 48, which was also a twin-boom aircraft that shared a broadly similar layout to the OV-10, was capable of outperforming the OV-10 in some respects, but crashed on 19 October 1965 after 196 test flights and Convair subsequently dropped out of contention.

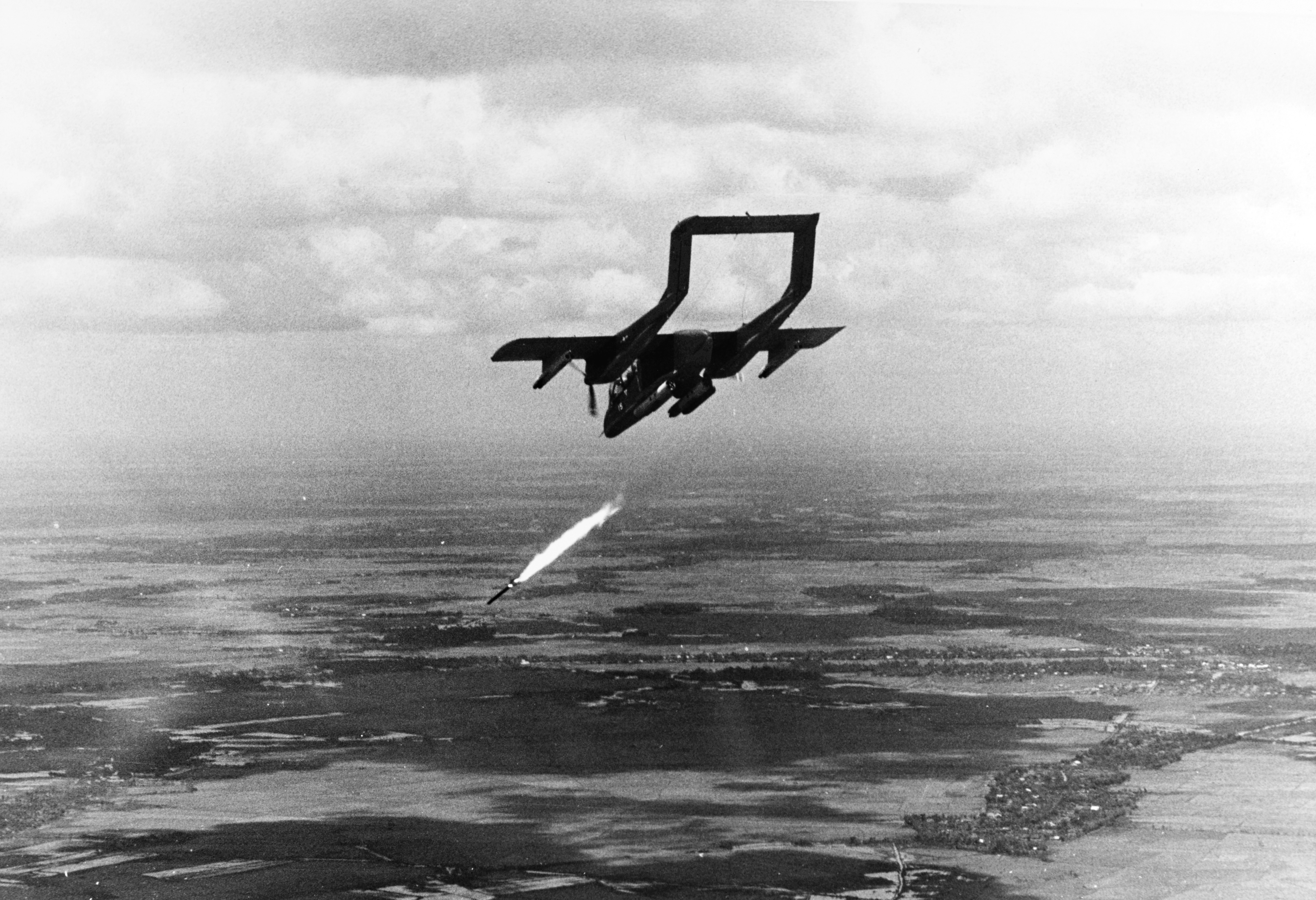
An OV-10A of VAL-4 attacking a target in Vietnam

On 16 July 1965, the prototype OV-10 made its maiden flight; it was smaller than the subsequent production aircraft, being operated by a single pilot and carrying several passengers in a cramped compartment behind this pilot. During flight testing, additional requirements were enacted, which included an observer as a second crewman, the adoption of armor plate around the crew and engines, an increased internal fuel capacity of 250 gallons, more communications apparatus, and an increased weapons capacity of 2,000 lb. These changes increased the OV-10's empty weight by 29 percent; to accommodate this increase, the wings were lengthened from 30 to 40 feet to improve lift while the power output of the engine was increased to 715 hp. The modified aircraft did not achieve Rice's L2 VMA concept, largely due to the longer wings having made it dependent on airbases. Rice concludes:

The original concept of a small, simple aircraft that could operate close to the supported troops had been almost completely eviscerated by the 'system'. The ability to operate from roads (20 ft span and 6.5 tread) had been ignored, and performance [was] compromised by the short 30 ft span, the extra 1,000 lb for the rough field landing gear and another 1,000 lb of electronics. The 'light, simple' airplane also had a full complement of instruments, ejection seats, and seven external store stations. The concept of using ground ordnance and a bomb bay had been ignored, although it did have provisions for four M60 [medium] machine guns. In spite of this growth (almost double the size and weight of our home built), the YOV-10 still had great potential. It would not achieve the advantages of integration with the ground scheme of maneuver, but it did have capabilities at the low end of the performance envelope that were still valuable and unique.

The first production OV-10A was delivered in June 1967. The type performed observation, forward air control, helicopter escort, armed reconnaissance, utility light air transport, and limited ground attack. It has also performed aerial radiological reconnaissance, tactical air observation, artillery and naval gunfire spotting, airborne control of tactical air support operations, and front-line, low-level aerial photography. A prototype in Vietnam designed to lay smoke was extremely successful, kept in service by evaluators for several months, and only reluctantly released, but was not purchased due to a perceived lack of mission.

== Design ==
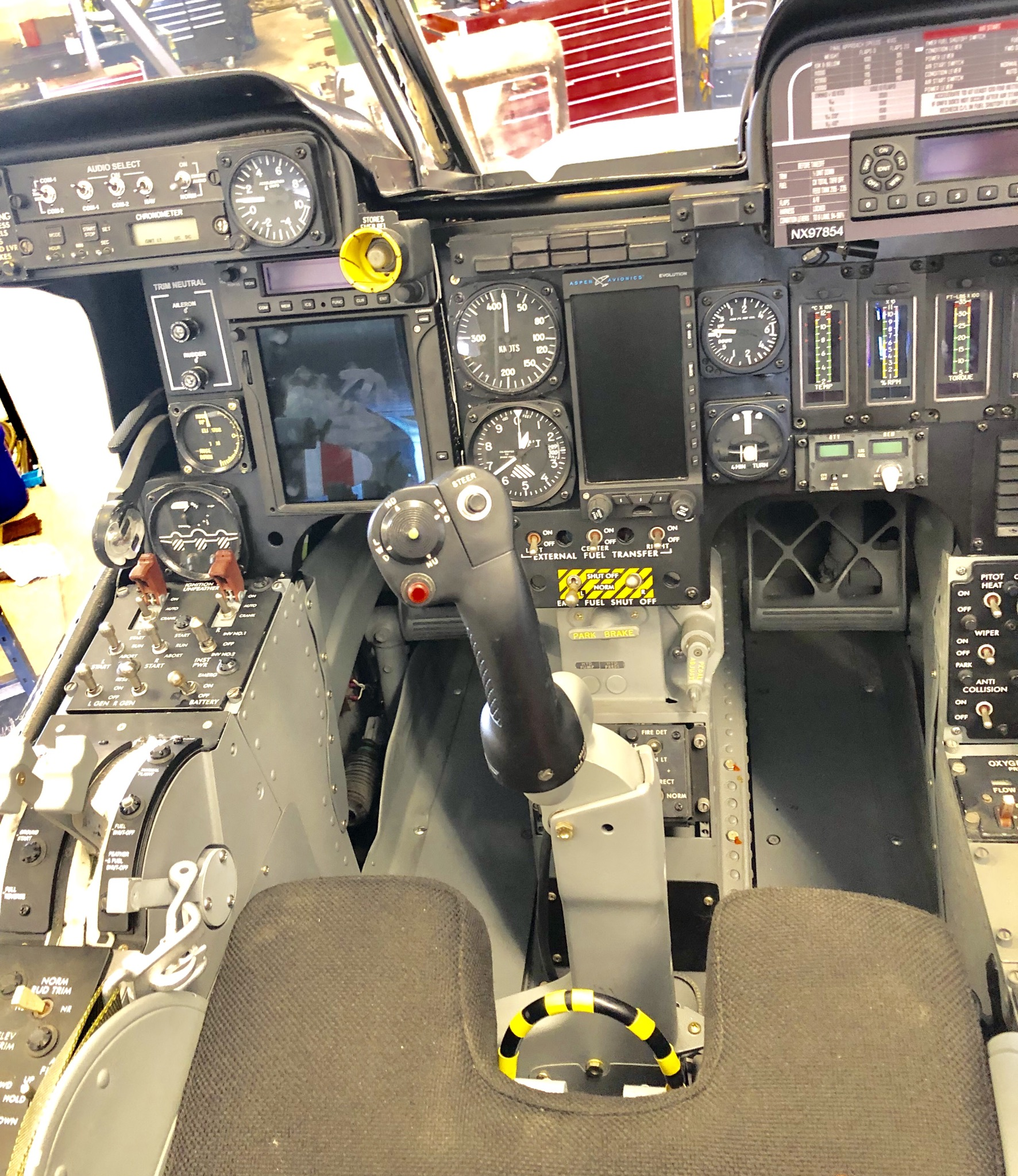
North American Rockwell OV-10D Bronco cockpit

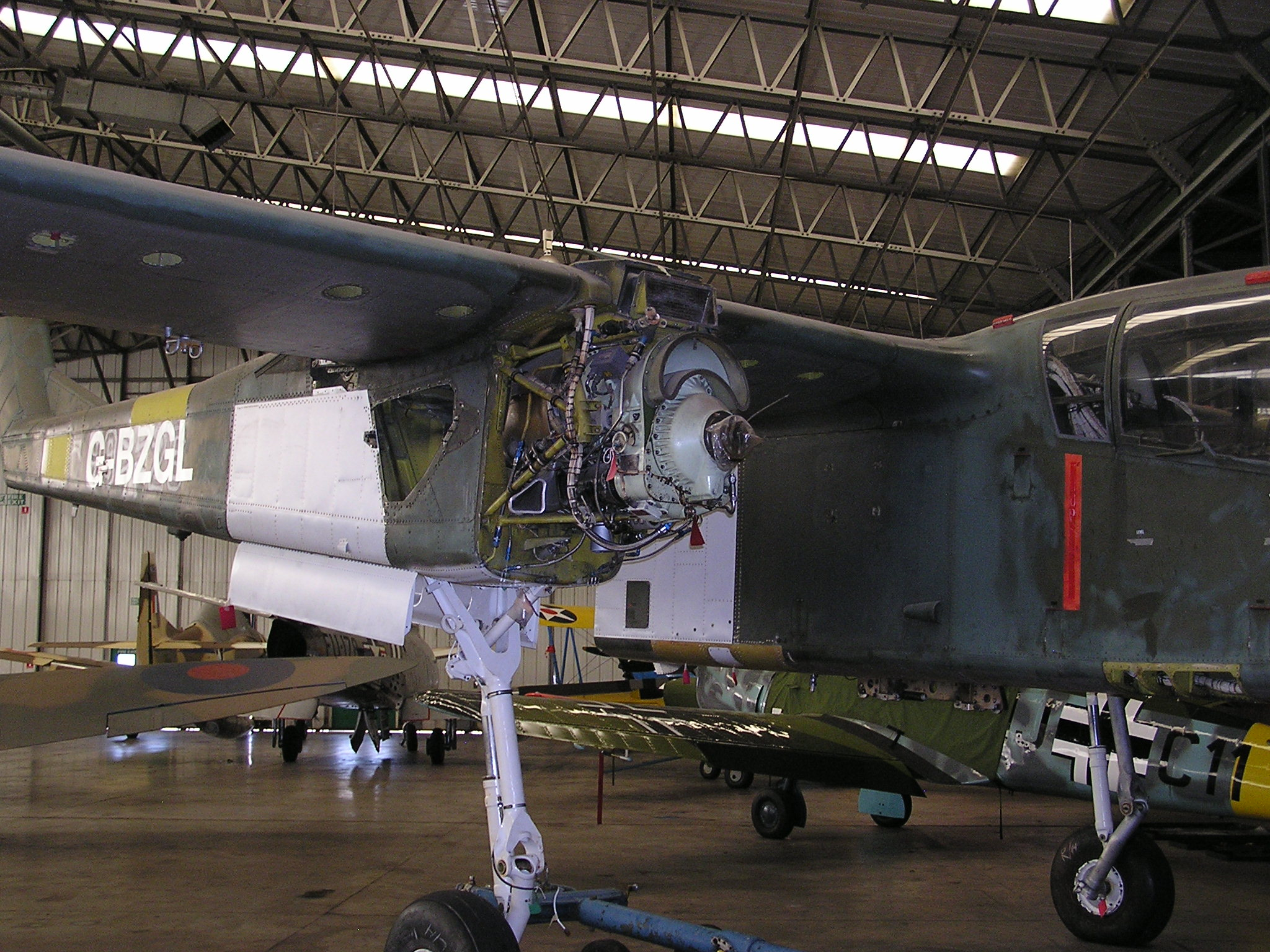
Engine installation on OV-10B Bronco

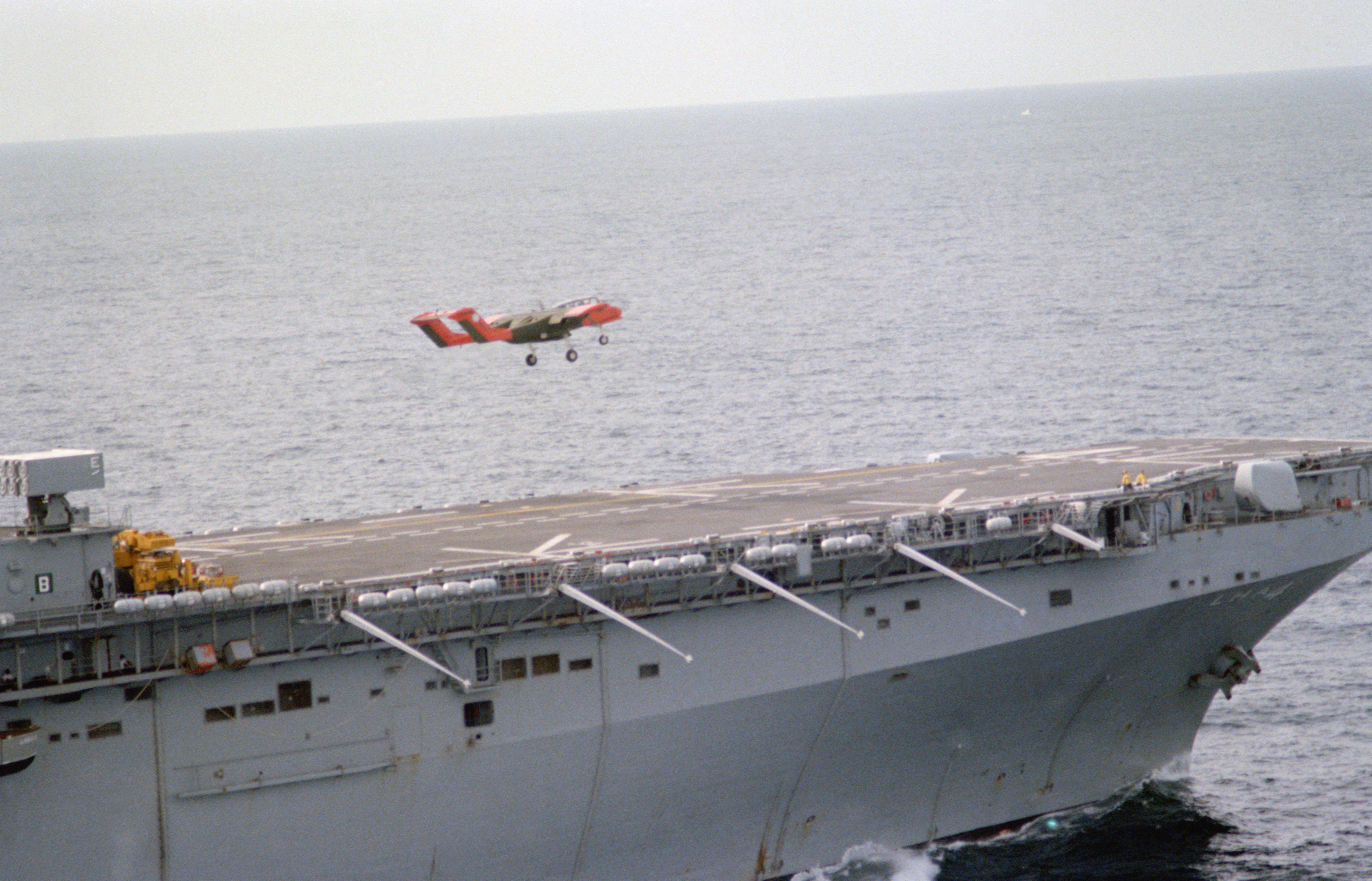
An OV-10A Bronco from VMO-1 takes off from the flight deck of USS Nassau in 1983

The general configuration of the OV-10 Bronco comprised a sizable central fuselage section that was attached to the main wing; in turn, the main wing was attached to twin booms. Between these twin booms was the horizontal stabilizer; this arrangement was advantageous for the air-dropping of cargo and paratroopers via a rear-facing removable hinged door. The aircraft's cargo bay could accommodate a maximum weight of 3,200 lb. Another advantage of the aircraft's general configuration, which is somewhat reminiscent of the Lockheed P-38 Lightning, is the alignment of the twin booms with the tail surfaces and the prop blast produced by the engines, which maximises directional control during takeoff. The cockpit, which was positioned in the middle fuselage section, was set well forward of the engines to provide favourable external visibility.

The aircraft's design supported effective operations from forward bases. The OV-10 can perform short takeoffs and landings, including on aircraft carriers and large-deck amphibious assault ships without using catapults or arresting wires. Further, the OV-10 was designed to take off and land on unimproved sites. Repairs could be made with ordinary tools and no ground equipment was required to start the engines. If necessary, the engines could operate on high-octane automobile fuel with only a slight loss of power. The airframe was designed to withstand up to eight G.

The aircraft had responsive handling and could fly for 5 1/2 hours with external fuel tanks. With the second seat removed, it can carry 3,200 pounds (1,500 kg) of cargo, five paratroopers, or two litter patients and an attendant. Empty weight was 6,969 pounds (3,161 kg). Normal operating fueled weight with two crew was 9,908 pounds (4,494 kg). Maximum takeoff weight was 14,446 pounds (6,553 kg). As standard, the crew was provisioned with North American Rockwell in-house designed ejection seats, with numerous successful ejections during service.

The bottom of the fuselage bore sponsons or "stub wings" that improved flight performance by decreasing aerodynamic drag underneath the fuselage. The sponsons were mounted horizontally on the prototype. Testing caused them to be redesigned for production aircraft; the downward angle of the sponsons on production models ensured that stores carried on the sponsons jettisoned cleanly. Normally, four 7.62 mm (.308 in) M60C machine guns were carried on the sponsons with the M60Cs accessed through a large, forward-opening hatch on the top of each sponson. The sponsons also had four racks to carry bombs, pods, or fuel. The wings outboard of the engines contain two additional racks, one per side. Racked armament in the Vietnam War was usually seven-shot 2.75 in (70 mm) rocket pods with white phosphorus marker rounds or high-explosive rockets, or 5 in (127 mm) four-shot Zuni rocket pods. Bombs, ADSIDS air-delivered/para-dropped unattended seismic sensors, Mk-6 battlefield illumination flares, and other stores were also carried.

Operational experience showed some weaknesses in the OV-10's design. It was significantly underpowered, which contributed to crashes in Vietnam in sloping terrain because the pilots could not climb fast enough. While specifications state that the aircraft could reach 26,000 feet (7,900 m), in the Vietnam theatre, the aircraft could reach only 18,000 feet (5,500 m). Also, no OV-10 pilot survived ditching the aircraft.

== Operational history ==
=== United States Marine Corps ===
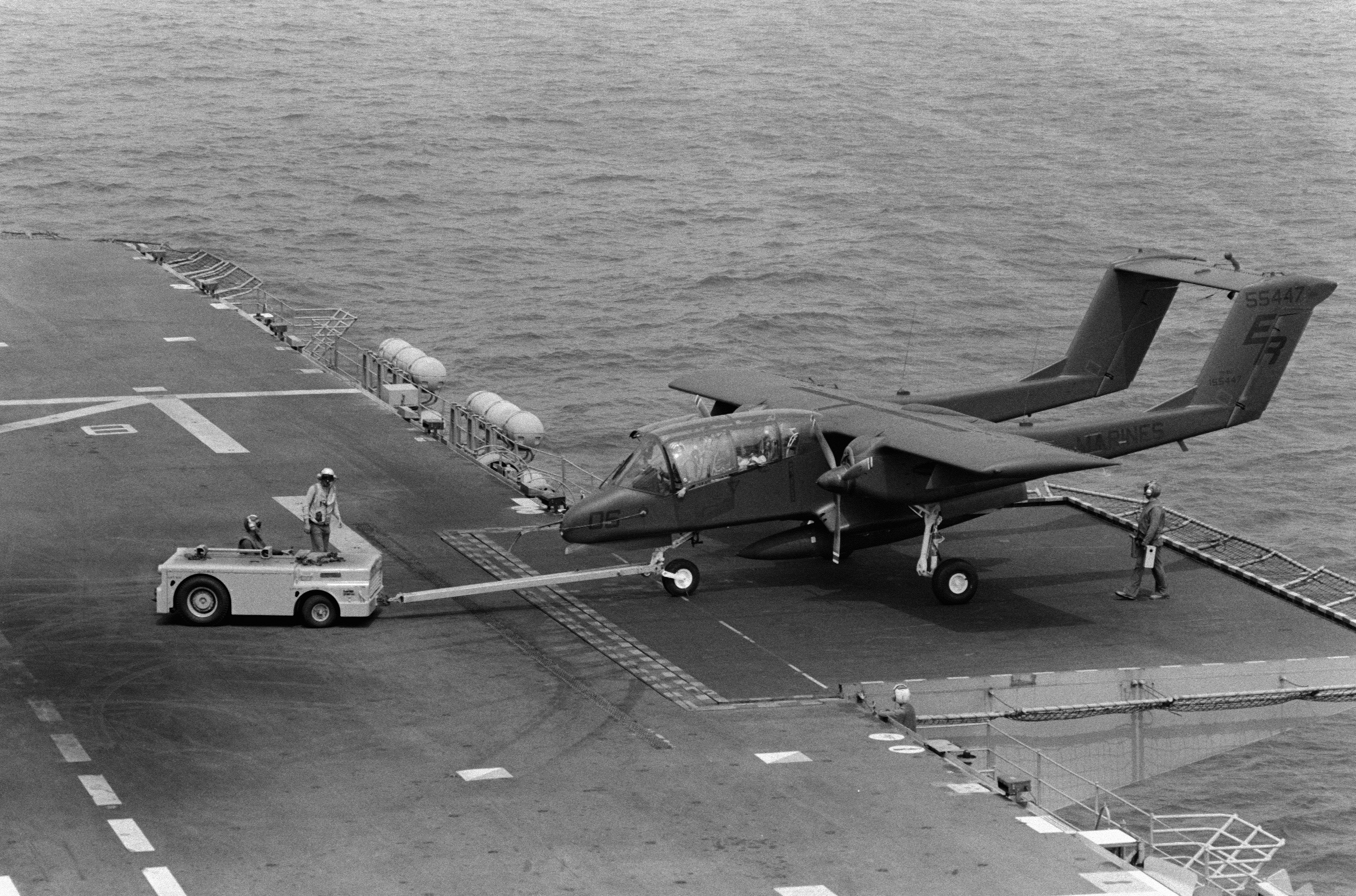
An OV-10A of VMO-1 operating from USS Nassau, 1983

The OV-10 was first acquired by the USMC, and made its combat debut in the Vietnam War in 1968. In the Vietnam theatre, the type was used in a variety of roles, including as a forward air controller (FAC), radio relay station, artillery spotter, helicopter escort, visual reconnaissance, convoy escort, and attack aircraft, across which the type's performance met or surpassed expectations.

Each of the USMC's two observation squadrons (designated VMO) had 18 aircraft – nine OV-10As and nine OV-10Ds - night-observation aircraft. A Marine Air Reserve observation squadron was also established.

Its last major combat deployment was during Operation Desert Storm, with the first units arriving in Saudi Arabia on 17 January 1991. In the theatre, the OV-10s were used to coordinate support for the coalition's ground forces as they rapidly advanced against Iraqi forces, increasing their awareness of what was in their vicinity as well as ensuring effective air support availability. The shooting down of two USMC OV-10s during this conflict has been attributed to a lack of effective infrared countermeasures, while its slow speed and low-altitude flight patterns were thought to have made the type more vulnerable to anti-aircraft weapons.

In the aftermath of Desert Storm, which had seen the final combat losses of the type in U.S. service, the USMC's OV-10 fleet was withdrawn in 1995. The forward air control mission was transferred to other assets, primarily ground units with laser designators and digital radios as well as the twin-seat McDonnell Douglas F/A-18D Hornet (FAC(A)s). Most operational Broncos were reassigned to civilian government agencies in the U.S., while some aircraft were sold to other countries.

The USMC YOV-10D night-observation gunship system (NOGS) program modified two OV-10As (BuNo 155395 and BuNo 155396) to include a turreted, forward-looking infrared (FLIR) sensor, laser target designator, and turreted 20 mm (.79 in) XM197 gun slaved to the FLIR aimpoint. NOGS succeeded in Vietnam, but funds to convert more aircraft were not approved. NOGS evolved into the NOS OV-10D, which included a laser designator, but no gun.

=== United States Air Force ===
The USAF acquired the Bronco primarily as an FAC aircraft. The first combat USAF OV-10As arrived in Vietnam on 31 July 1968 as part of "Operation Combat Bronco", an operational testing and evaluation of the aircraft. These test aircraft were attached to the 19th Tactical Air Support Squadron, 504th Tactical Air Support Group at Bien Hoa Air Base in South Vietnam. The test roles included the full range of missions then assigned to FAC aircraft, including day- and night-strike direction, gunship direction, bomb damage assessment, visual reconnaissance, aerial artillery direction, and as escorts for aircraft engaged in Operation Ranch Hand. The aircraft's ability to generate smoke internally was used for strike direction and "in four specific instances under conditions of reduced visibility, the smoke was seen by strike aircrews before the [OV-10A] [was] detected." Operation Combat Bronco ended on 30 October 1968.

After the end of Combat Bronco, the USAF began to deploy larger numbers to the 19th TASS (Bien Hoa), 20th TASS (Da Nang Air Base), and for out-of-country missions to the 23d TASS (Nakhom Phanom in Thailand). The 23d TASS conducted Operation Igloo White, Operation Prairie Fire/Daniel Boone, and other special operations missions.

Between 1968 and 1971, 26 pilots from the Royal Australian Air Force (RAAF) and Royal New Zealand Air Force (RNZAF) flew the OV-10A on FAC sorties, while attached to USAF squadrons. The 19th TASS hosted 13 RAAF pilots and three from the RNZAF; another seven RAAF pilots and three from the RNZAF were assigned to the 20th TASS. (Consequently, the Australian War Memorial has acquired an OV-10A 67-14639, which was flown by some of these pilots.)

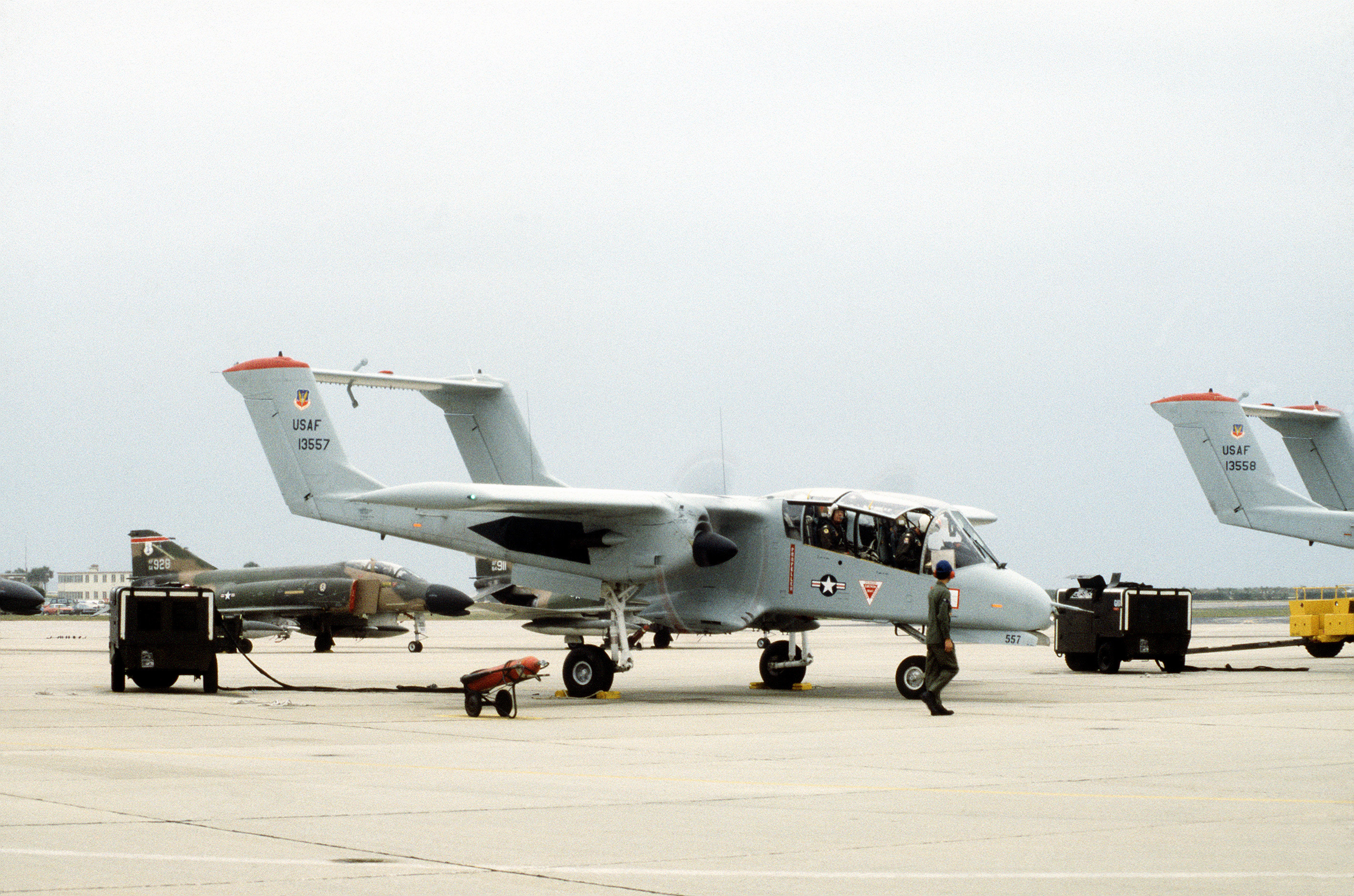
An OV-10A at Patrick Air Force Base, Florida, in 1980

From April to June 1969, the USAF conducted an operational exercise called "Misty Bronco" in South Vietnam's III Corps tactical zone to evaluate the OV-10A's performance as a light strike aircraft. The results were positive, and by October 1969, every USAF OV-10A had been armed with their internal .308 in (7.62 mm) M60C machine guns, which had generally been left out during the Combat Bronco evaluations and subsequent deployment. High-explosive 2.75 in (70 mm) rockets were also authorized for use against ground targets.

In 1971, the 23d TASS's OV-10A Broncos received modifications under project Pave Nail. Carried out by LTV Electrosystems during 1970, these modifications primarily included the addition of the Pave Spot target laser designator pod, and a specialized night periscope (replacing the initial starlight scopes that had been used for night operations) and LORAN equipment. The call sign Nail was the radio handle of this squadron. These aircraft supported interdiction of troops and supplies on the Ho Chi Minh Trail by illuminating targets for laser-guided bombs dropped by McDonnell F-4 Phantom IIs. After 1974, these aircraft were converted back to an unmodified OV-10A standard.

At least 157 OV-10As were delivered to the USAF before production ended in April 1969. The USAF lost 64 OV-10s during the conflict to all causes. In the late 1980s, the USAF started to replace their OV-10s with OA-37B and OA-10A aircraft. Unlike the USMC, the USAF did not deploy the type to the Middle East in response to the Iraqi invasion of Kuwait, as it believed that the OV-10 was too vulnerable. The final two USAF squadrons equipped with the OV-10, the 19th and 21st Tactical Air Support Squadron (TASS) retired the OV-10 on 1 September 1991.

In 2012, $20 million were allocated to activate an experimental unit of two OV-10s, acquired from NASA and the State Department. Starting in May 2015, these aircraft were deployed to support Operation Inherent Resolve flying combat missions over Iraq and Syria, flying more than 120 combat sorties over 82 days. They reportedly provided close air support for Special Forces missions. The experiment ended satisfactorily, but an USAF spokesman stated they are unlikely to invest in reactivating the OV-10 on a regular basis on account of the overhead cost of operating an additional aircraft type.

=== United States Navy ===
The USN formed Light Attack Squadron Four (VAL-4), the "Black Ponies", on 3 January 1969 to operate the type. In the Vietnam theatre, USN OV-10s were active between April 1969 and April 1972 to perform various roles, including a light ground-attack aircraft, the interdiction of enemy logistics, scramble alert, artillery spotting, and fire support of USMC, SEALs, and naval riverine force vessels. The USN recorded the loss of seven OV-10s during the conflict to various causes. Other than OV-10 fleet replacement training done in cooperation with Air Antisubmarine Squadron 41 (VS-41) at NAS North Island, California, VAL-4 was the only squadron in the USN to ever employ the OV-10, and it was decommissioned shortly following the end of the Vietnam War. VAL-4's surviving OV-10s were subsequently transferred to the USMC.

At least two USN Broncos were used as test beds in the 1970s at the Naval Air Test Center at NAS Patuxent River, Maryland. Furthermore, two OV-10s were evaluated for special operations, while the USMC lent 18 aircraft for operation by VAL-4 in Vietnam.

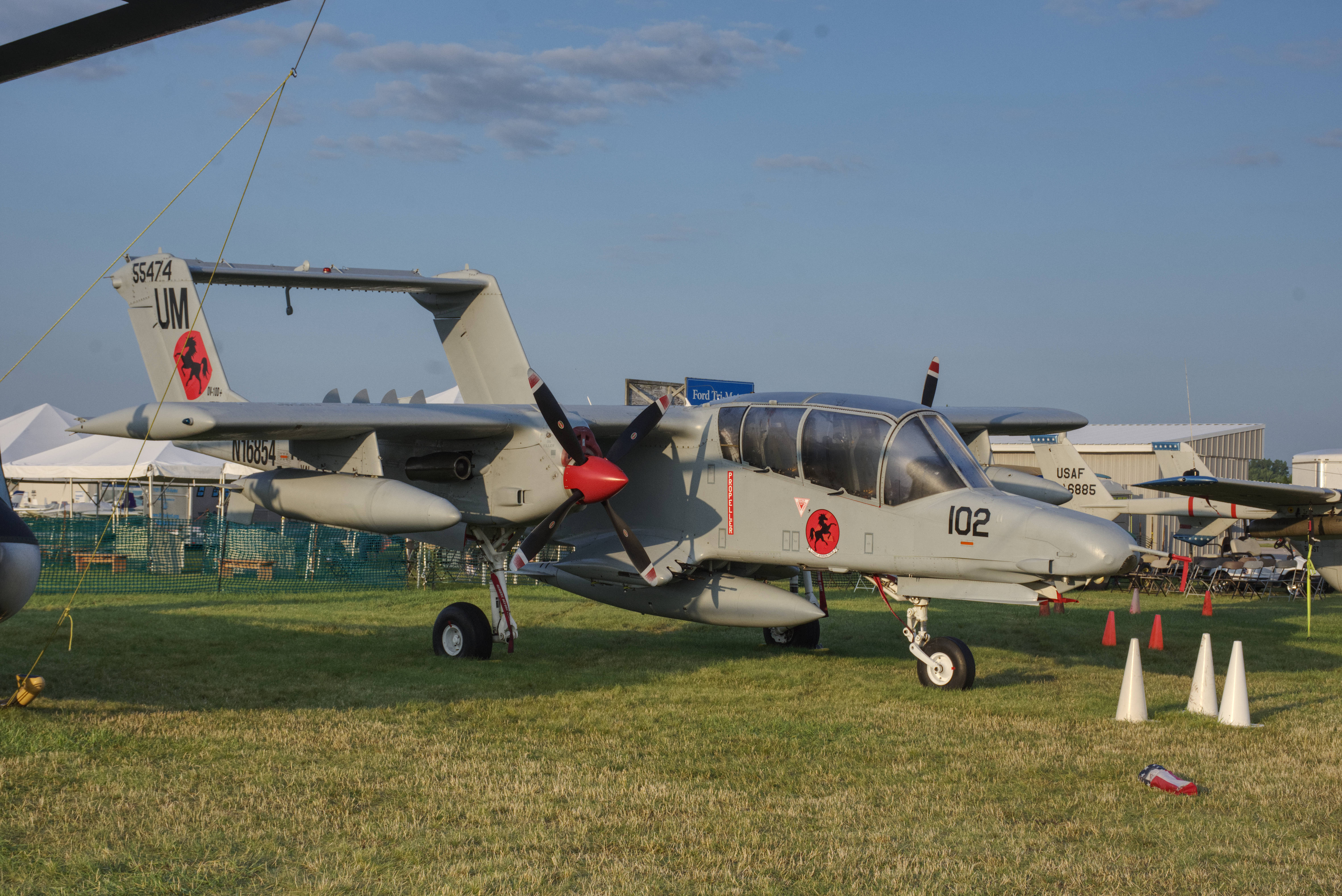
OV-10 Bronco White Lightning in 2024

In 2015, two OV-10Gs were assigned for light attack operations in Iraq under the "Combat Dragon II" program and completed 120 missions.

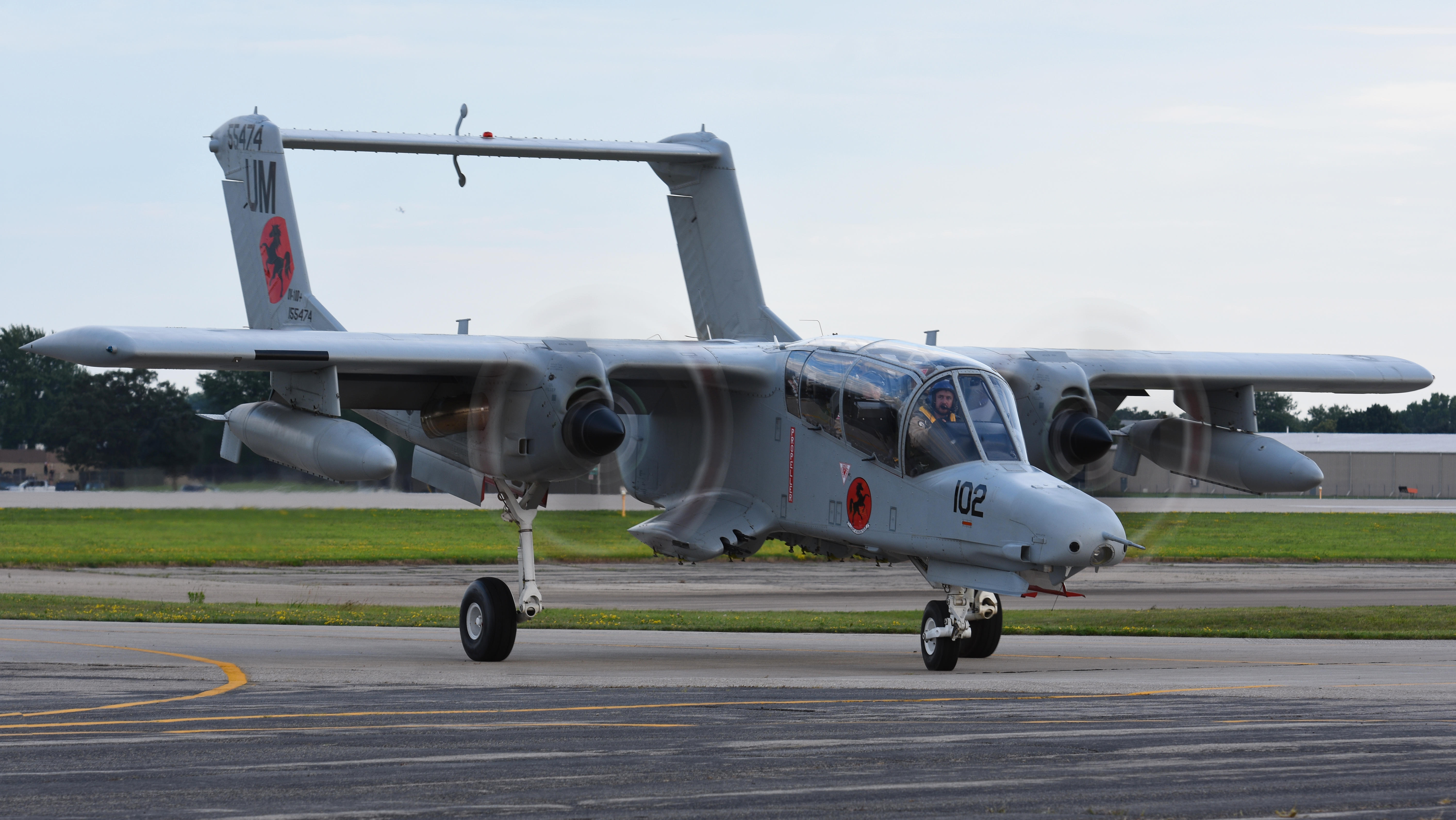
OV-10 White Lightning arriving at AirVenture 2025

In 2019, the first of two former VAL-4 aircraft returned to flight by the OV-10 Squadron, Chino, California. Bureau numbers 155493 Holy Terror and 155474 White Lightning. Extensive restoration work of more than 18 months performed by California Aerofab went into 493 and 474's returns to flight.

=== Colombia ===
In 1991, the USAF provided the Colombian Air Force with 12 OV-10As. Later, three ex-USMC A-models were also acquired to provide parts support. Colombia operates the aircraft in a COIN role against an active insurgency. At least one aircraft has been lost in combat. The remaining OV-10As were upgraded to OV-10D standard. In November 2015, and after 24 years of service, the Colombian Air Force retired all of its remaining OV-10 aircraft.

=== Germany ===
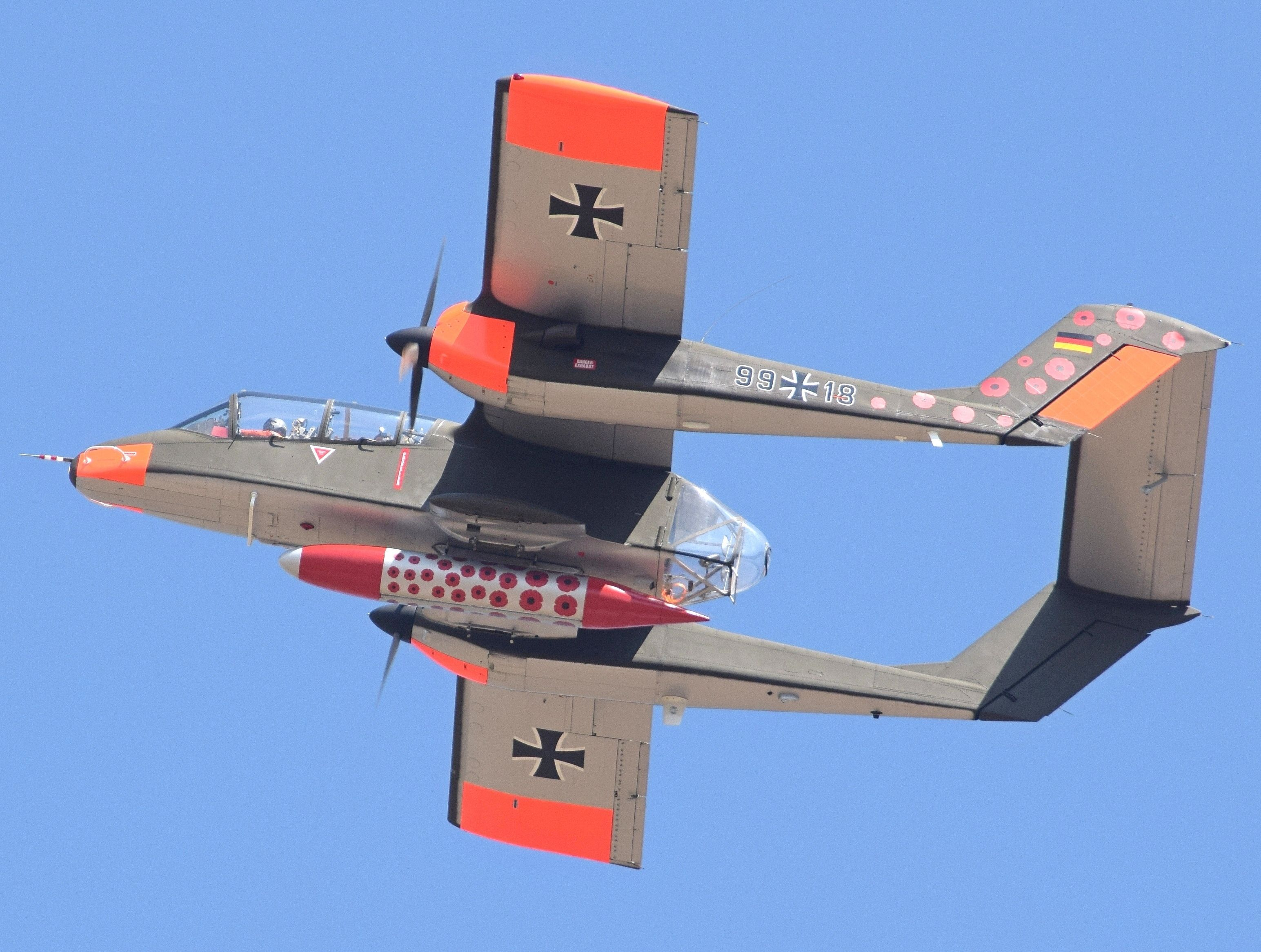
North American Rockwell OV-10B Bronco of the Bronco Demo Team at the 2018 RIAT, England: This is an ex-Luftwaffe B-model originally used as an aerial gunnery target tug. The OV-10B was an OV-10A with no weapons, no sponsons, and a transparent plastic dome replacing the rear door, which was used by the tow operator.

The OV-10B variant was produced for Germany to use as target tug. The 18 aircraft delivered in the late 1960s were equipped with target-towing equipment inside the fuselage. A transparent plastic dome replaced the rear cargo door, and a rear seat was installed in the cargo bay to look backwards out of the dome. After a long career, the Bronco was replaced by the Pilatus PC-9 in 1990 and all aircraft were retired and sent to various museums and technical schools, or used in aircraft battle-damage repair.

=== Indonesia ===
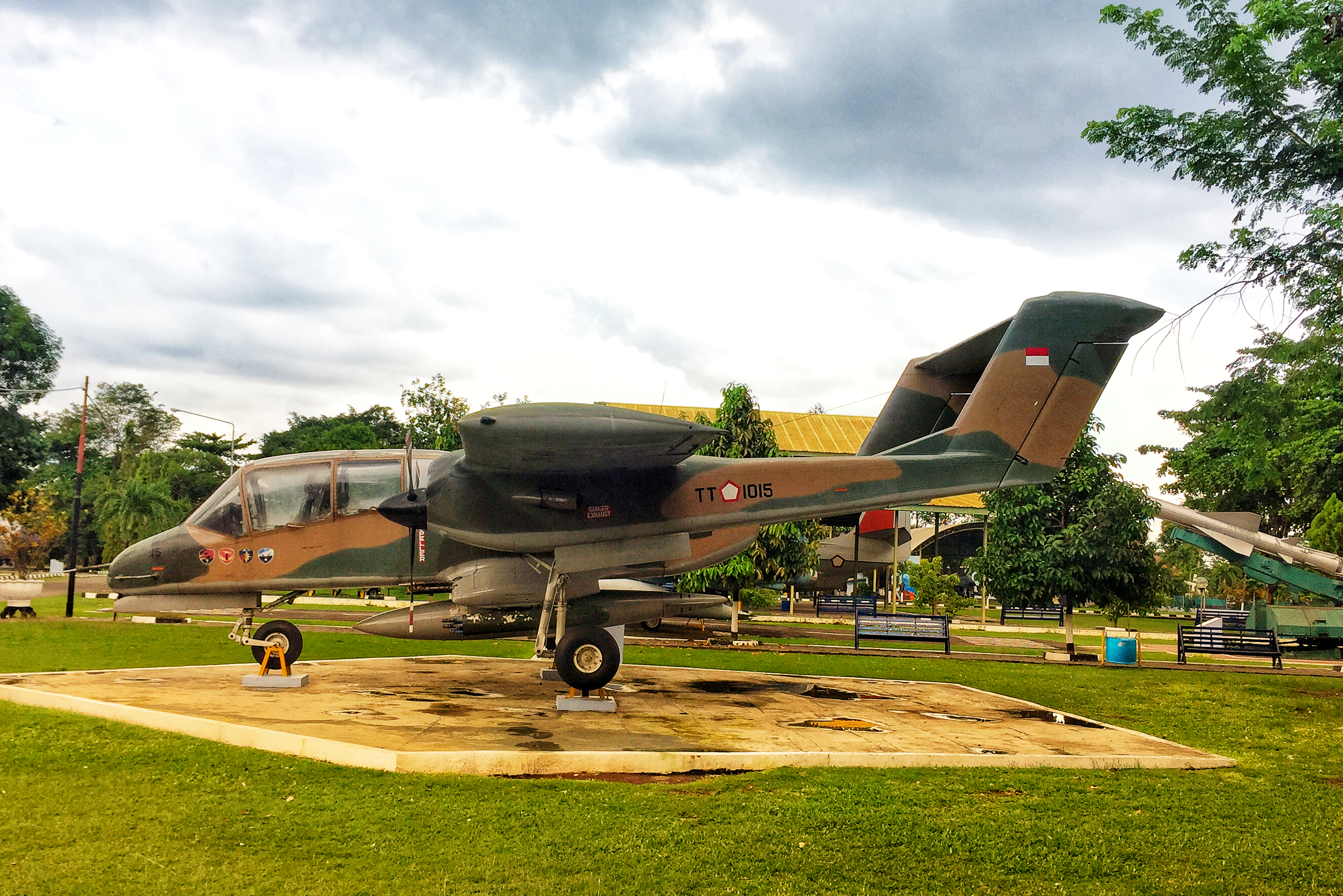
Indonesian Air Force OV-10F

The Indonesian Air Force purchased 16 OV-10F aircraft in 1976. The aircraft were ferried across the Pacific Ocean from Wright-Patterson AFB to the Halim Perdanakusuma Airport via Alaska, Aleutians, Midway, Wake Island, Guam, and Clark Field. They were operated in COIN operations similar to the U.S. Navy's Vietnam missions with their Broncos, but retrofitted .50 cal (12.7 mm) Browning heavy machine guns in place of the .30 cal (7.62 mm) machine guns. These aircraft were based in Abdulrachman Saleh Air Force Base in Malang, East Java.

In October 1976, three OV-10F were deployed to the Penfui Airport in West Timor, starting its vital career in the invasion of East Timor and ensuing COIN operations. During the operations in East Timor, the OV-10F flight were given the callsign Kampret (microbat). Starting in February 1977, up to six OV-10F were based at Dili Airport, with Baucau Airport serving as frontline airbase. During its initial years, the Indonesian Air Force modified the aircraft bomb racks to carry Soviet-made bombs and rockets as a stopgap measure, as U.S.-supplied bombs would only be received in early 1980. During its 23 years of operation in East Timor, two OV-10F were lost in noncombat accidents, with two crew missing and one killed.

In 1977, the OV-10Fs were used during the aerial bombardments of Amungme villages near Freeport-McMoRan area of operations, West Papua, in response to OPM attacks on the mining company facilities, and of Dani villages in Baliem Valley, also in West Papua, in response to rebellion against enforced participation in the Indonesian general election.

At the start of the 2003–2004 Indonesian offensive in Aceh on 19–20 May 2003, the OV-10Fs were providing air support for airborne landings in Banda Aceh and Takengon.

The Indonesian Air Force grounded their OV-10Fs following a fatal accident on 23 July 2007. They were replaced by Embraer Super Tucanos in 2012.

=== Morocco ===
The Royal Moroccan Air Force acquired six former USMC OV-10As in 1981, which were flown to Morocco from Columbus, Ohio, via Canada, Greenland, and Iceland. They were accompanied by 15 US Marines from VMO-1 and VMO-2, who formed a mobile training team. The aircraft were based in Marrakesh Menara Airport, where they were employed in COIN operations against Polisario forces in the Western Sahara War using rocket pods and gun pods. One was shot down in 1985, with the loss of its pilot.

=== Philippines ===
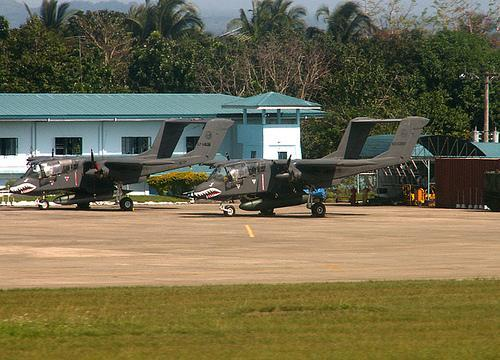
PAF OV-10A SLEP at Lumbia Airport

The Philippine Air Force (PAF) received 24 OV-10As from U.S. stocks in 1991, later followed by a further nine from the United States, and eight ex-Thai Air Force OV-10Cs in 2003–2004. The OV-10s are operated by the 16th Attack Squadron and 25th Composite Attack Squadron of the 15th Strike Wing, based in Sangley Point, Cavite. The PAF flies Broncos on search-and-rescue and COIN operations in various parts of the Philippines. The first two women combat pilots in the PAF flew OV-10s with the 16th. This squadron flew antiterrorist operations in the Jolo island.

PAF OV-10 Broncos were repeatedly used in air strikes against Moro Islamic Liberation Front positions during ongoing fighting in 2011, and two were used in an air strike in February 2012, which resulted in the death of three Abu Sayyaf and Jemaah Islamiyah commanders, among others. Philippine Air Force OV-10s have been reportedly modified in order to employ modern smart bombs.

On 1 June 2017, the PAF OV-10s dropped bombs on Maute group positions during the Battle of Marawi.

The PAF announced that its remaining OV-10s would be replaced by the Embraer EMB 314 Super Tucano by 2024, to meet requirements set by the AFP Modernization Act to replace the aging aircraft. The OV-10s had finally withdrawn from service on 28 December 2024.

=== Thailand ===
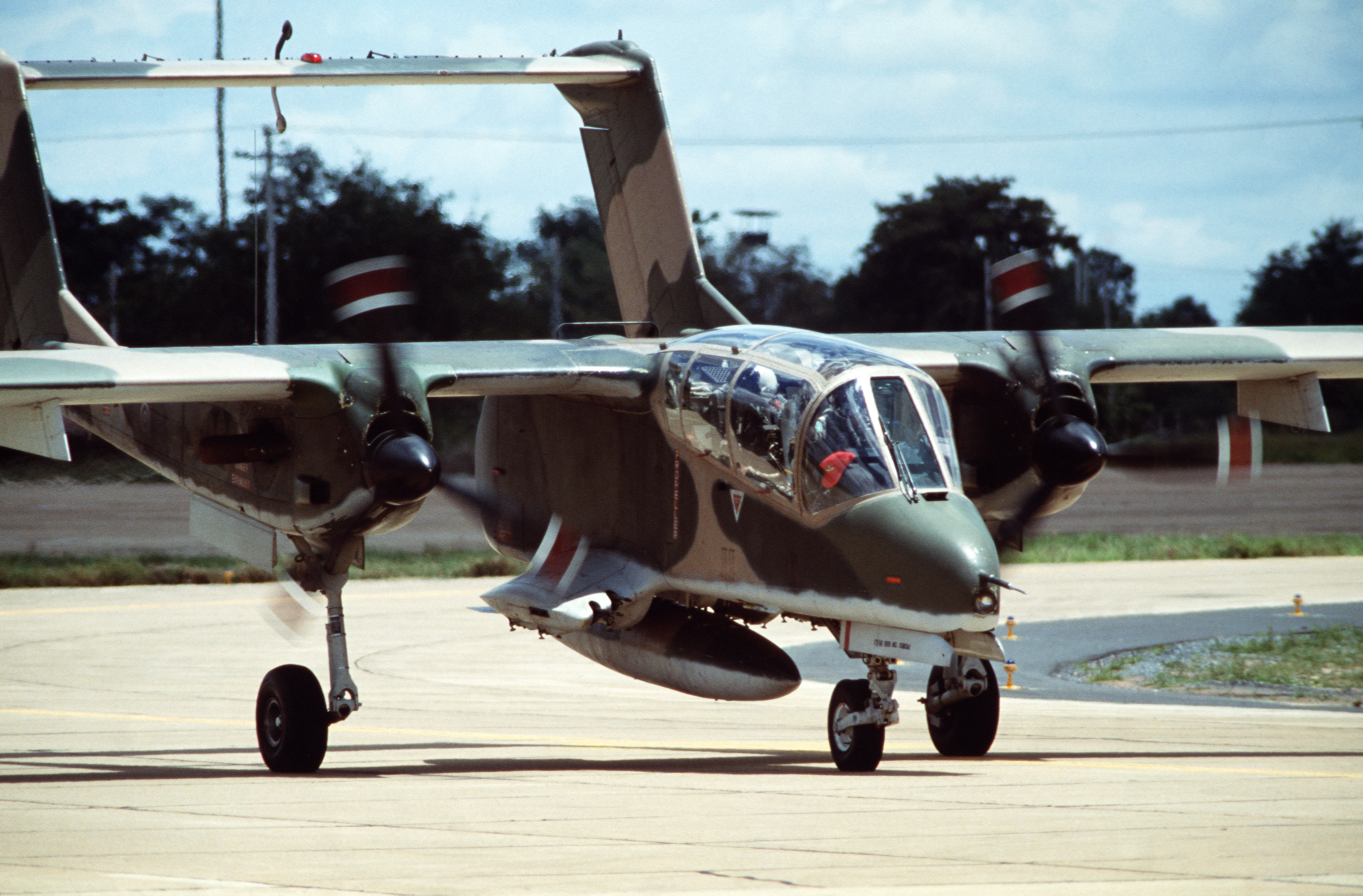
A RTAF OV-10C at Korat in 1987

The Royal Thai Air Force (RTAF) purchased 32 new OV-10C aircraft in the early 1970s for COIN usage. Reportedly, Broncos won the majority of Thai bombing competitions until the F-5E became operational. At one time, the RTAF flew OV-10s as air-defense aircraft. In 2004, RTAF donated most of the OV-10s to the Philippines. Three OV-10 survivors are displayed, one each at the Tango Squadron Wing 41 Museum in Chiang Mai, the RTAF Museum in Bangkok, and a static display at the main gate of Wing 5 in Prachuap Khiri Khan. The remaining OV-10s were to be donated to the PAF in 2011.

=== Venezuela ===
The Venezuelan Air Force has operated a number of new-build OV-10Es and ex-USAF OV-10As over the years. On 27 November 1992, the aircraft were widely used by mutinous officers who staged an attempted coup d'état against former President Carlos Andrés Pérez. The rebels dropped bombs and launched rockets against police and government buildings in Caracas. Four Broncos were lost during the uprising, including two shot down by a loyalist General Dynamics F-16 Fighting Falcon.

Venezuela's OV-10s were to be retired in the coming years. Originally, Venezuela attempted to procure Embraer Super Tucano aircraft to replace the OV-10, but no deal was achieved, which President Chavez claimed was due to the result of pressure from the U.S. government. The Venezuelan government has decided not to replace them with new fixed-wing aircraft. Rather, the Venezuelan Air Force is replacing them with the Russian-made Mil Mi-28 attack helicopter.

=== Other U.S. usage ===
==== NASA ====
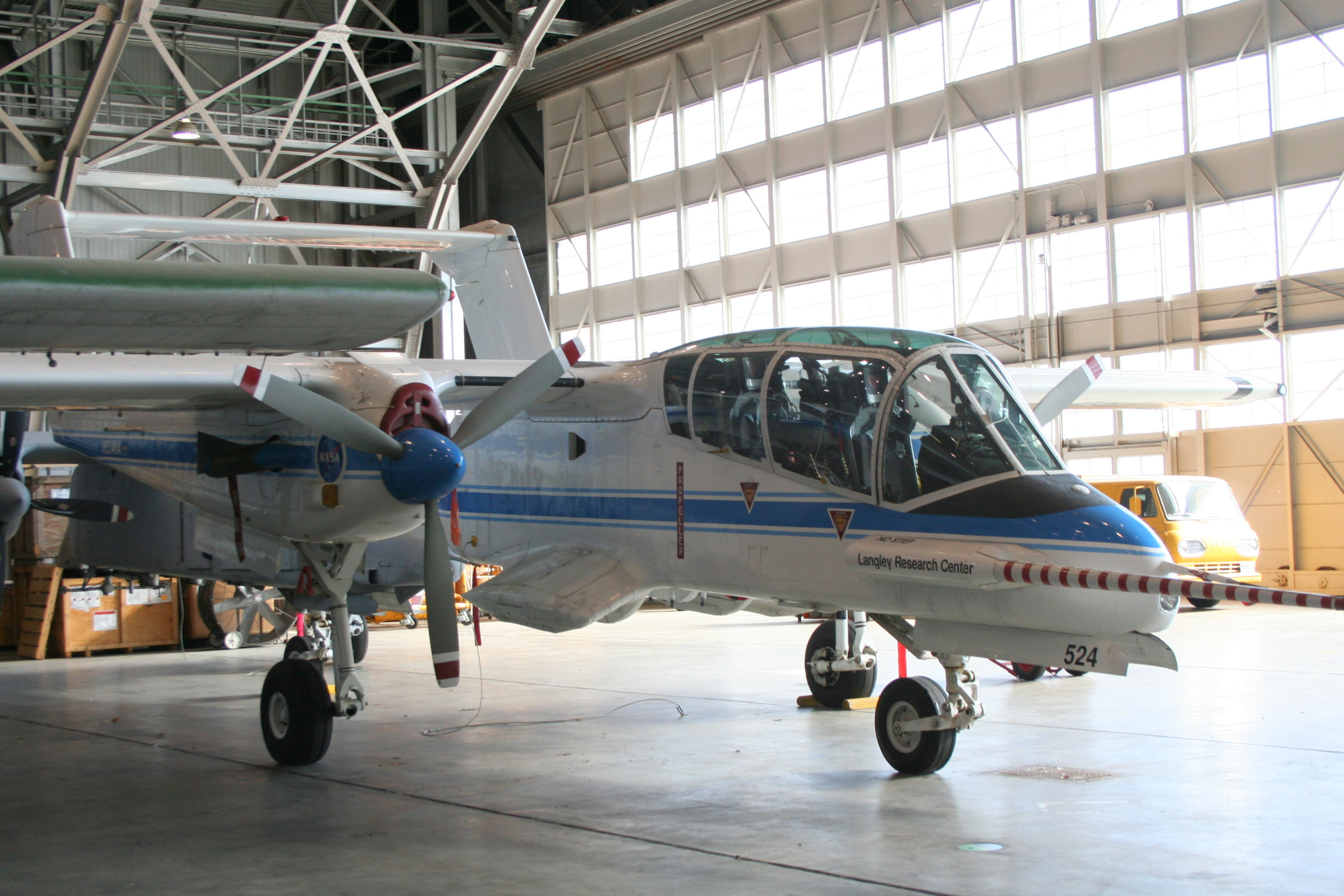
OV-10 in NASA livery

NASA has used a number of Broncos for various research programs, including studies of low-speed flight carried out with the third prototype in the 1970s, and studies on noise and wake turbulence. One OV-10 remained in use at NASA's Langley base in 2009, with three additional aircraft obtained from the Department of State formerly used in drug-eradication efforts.

==== U.S. Department of State Air Wing ====
The Department of State (DoS) aircraft are former USAF OV-10A and USMC OV-10D aircraft operated under contract by DynCorp International in support of U.S. drug interdiction and eradication efforts in South America. The aircraft carry civilian U.S. aircraft registration numbers, and when not forward deployed, are home-based at a DoS/DynCorp facility at Patrick Space Force Base, Florida.

These aircraft have received numerous alterations, including the removal of the sponsons and the installation of Kevlar external armor panels around the cockpits. A belly-mounted wind-driven pump, adapted from agricultural aircraft, works in conjunction with more than a 500 gal (1,900 L) hopper tank installed in the cargo bay. A spray bar extended out to a V from the cargo bay to the tailbooms. A surviving aircraft in this configuration is on display in Tennessee.

==== Bureau of Land Management ====
The U.S. Bureau of Land Management (BLM) acquired seven OV-10As for use as fire-fighting aircraft, including the YOV-10A prototype. In this role, they lead firefighting air tankers through their intended flight paths over their target areas. The aircraft were operated in their basic military configurations, but with their ejection seats disabled. The aircraft's existing smoke system was used to mark the path for the following air tankers. Given the age of the aircraft, spare parts became difficult to obtain, contributing to the BLM opting to retire their fleet in 1999.

==== California Department of Forestry and Fire Protection ====
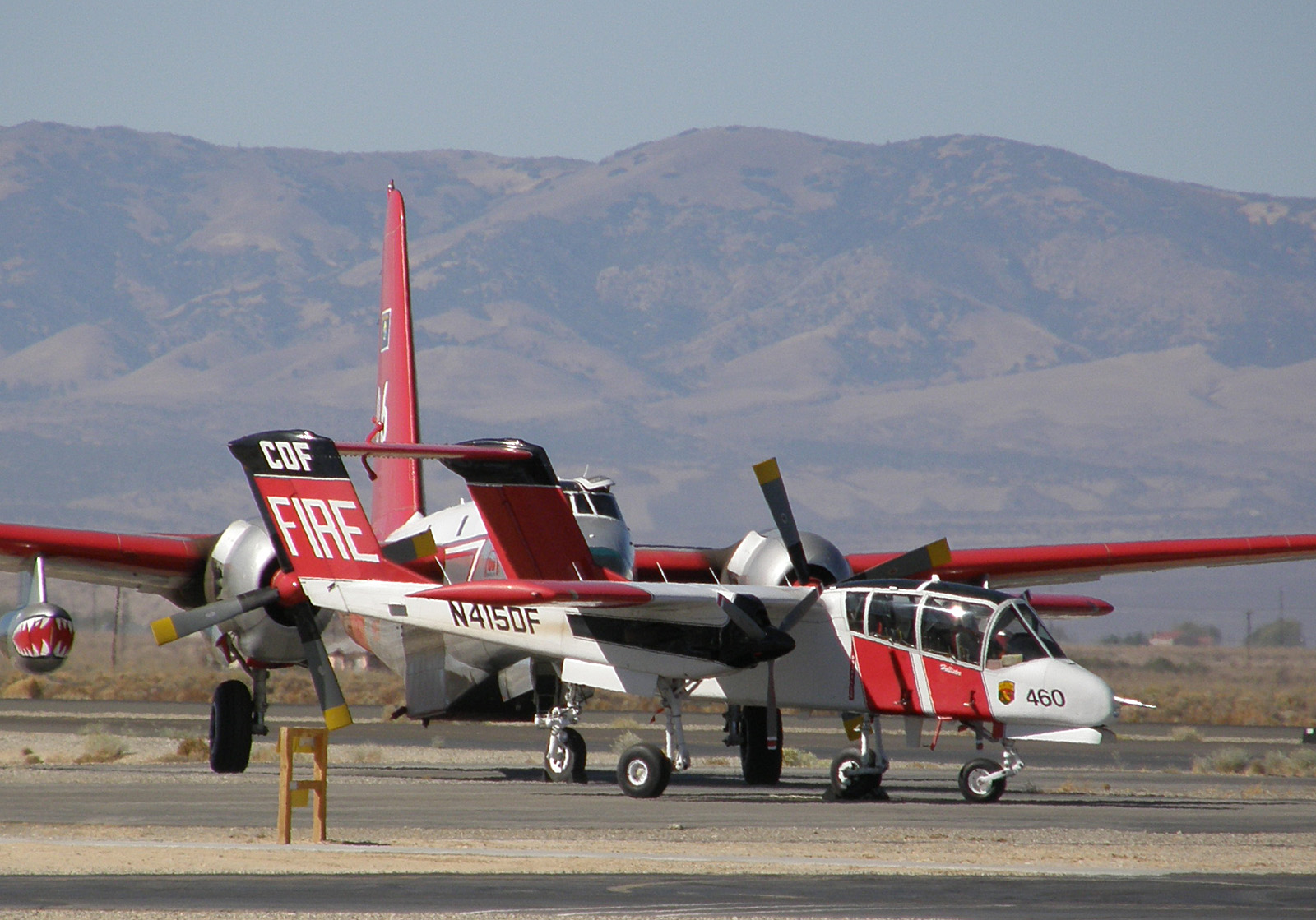
Air Attack 460 at Fox Field during the October 2007 California wildfires with a Lockheed P2V in background

The California Department of Forestry and Fire Protection (CALFIRE) has acquired a number of OV-10As, including the six surviving aircraft from the BLM and 13 former USMC aircraft in 1993 to replace their existing Cessna O-2 Skymasters as air-attack aircraft. The CALFIRE Broncos fly with a crew of two, a contract pilot and the CALFIRE air tactical group supervisor, whose job it is to coordinate all aerial assets on a fire with the incident commander on the ground. Thus, besides serving as a tanker lead-in aircraft, the OV-10A is also the aerial platform from which the entire air operation is co-ordinated.

== Variants ==
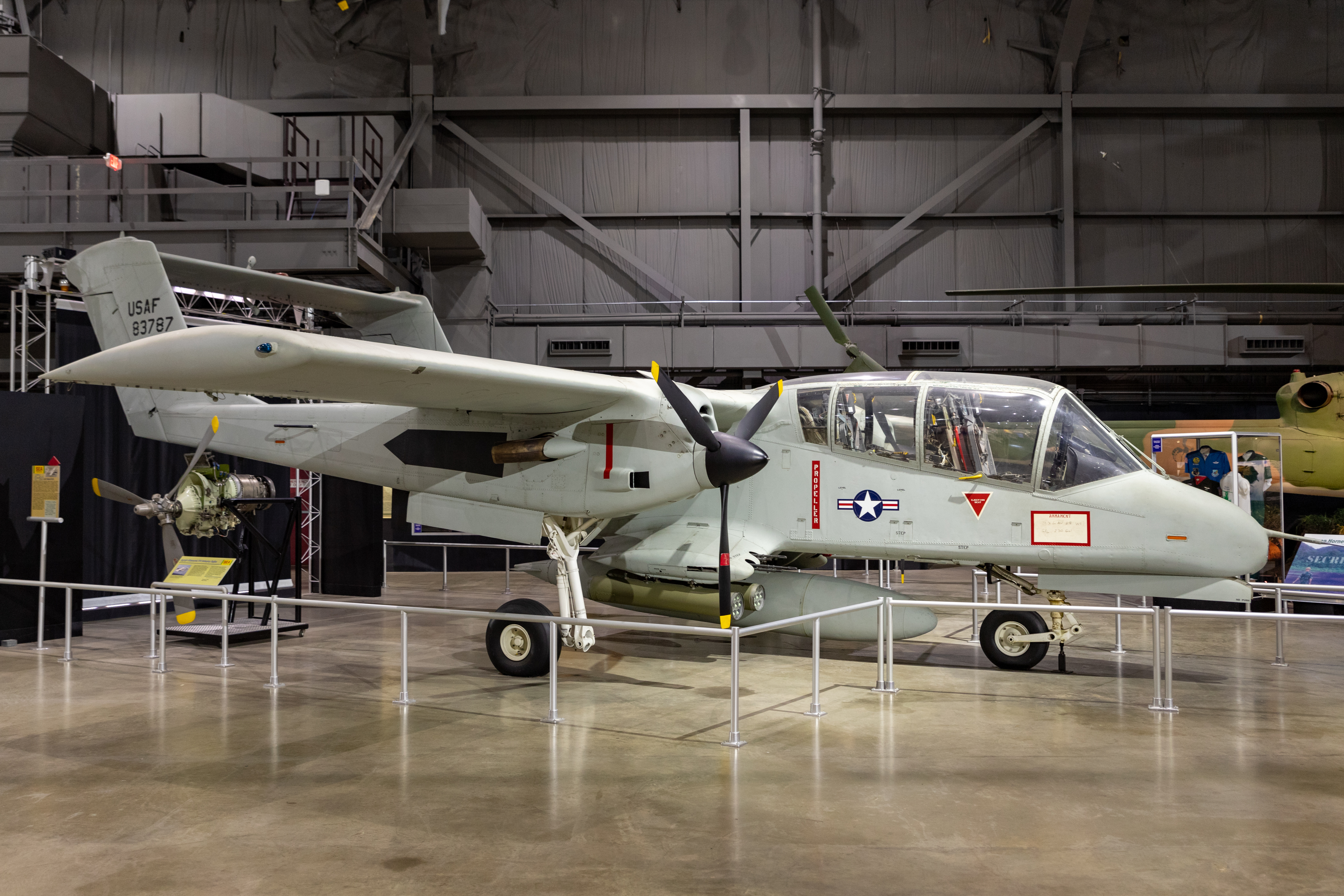
OV-10A at Wright-Patterson National Museum of the USAF

YOV-10A
Seven prototype NA-300s with two 600 shp T76-G-6/8 engines, last one was flown with YT74-P-1 engines.
OV-10A
Original production version with enlarged wing and 715 shp T76-G-10/12 engines. Distinguished by a long-wire high frequency (HF) antenna between the center rear stabilizer and the central nacelle, 114 for the USMC and 157 for the USAF.
OV-10B
Target towing variant for Germany, with a target towing pod mounted beneath the fuselage. A clear dome replaced the rear cargo door. The rear seat was moved to the cargo bay to look backwards out the dome, 18 built; known as the OV-10B(Z) when fitted with an additional J85-GE-4 turbojet.
OV-10B(Z)
A variation of the German target tug, with one J85-GE-4 turbojet mounted in a nacelle above the fuselage. A total of 18 aircraft were supplied to the Germans.
OV-10C
Export version for Thailand; based on the OV-10A, 32 built.
YOV-10D (NOGS)
The prototype Night Observation Gunship System variant developed as the YOV-10D, two OV-10A conversions, 155395,155396.

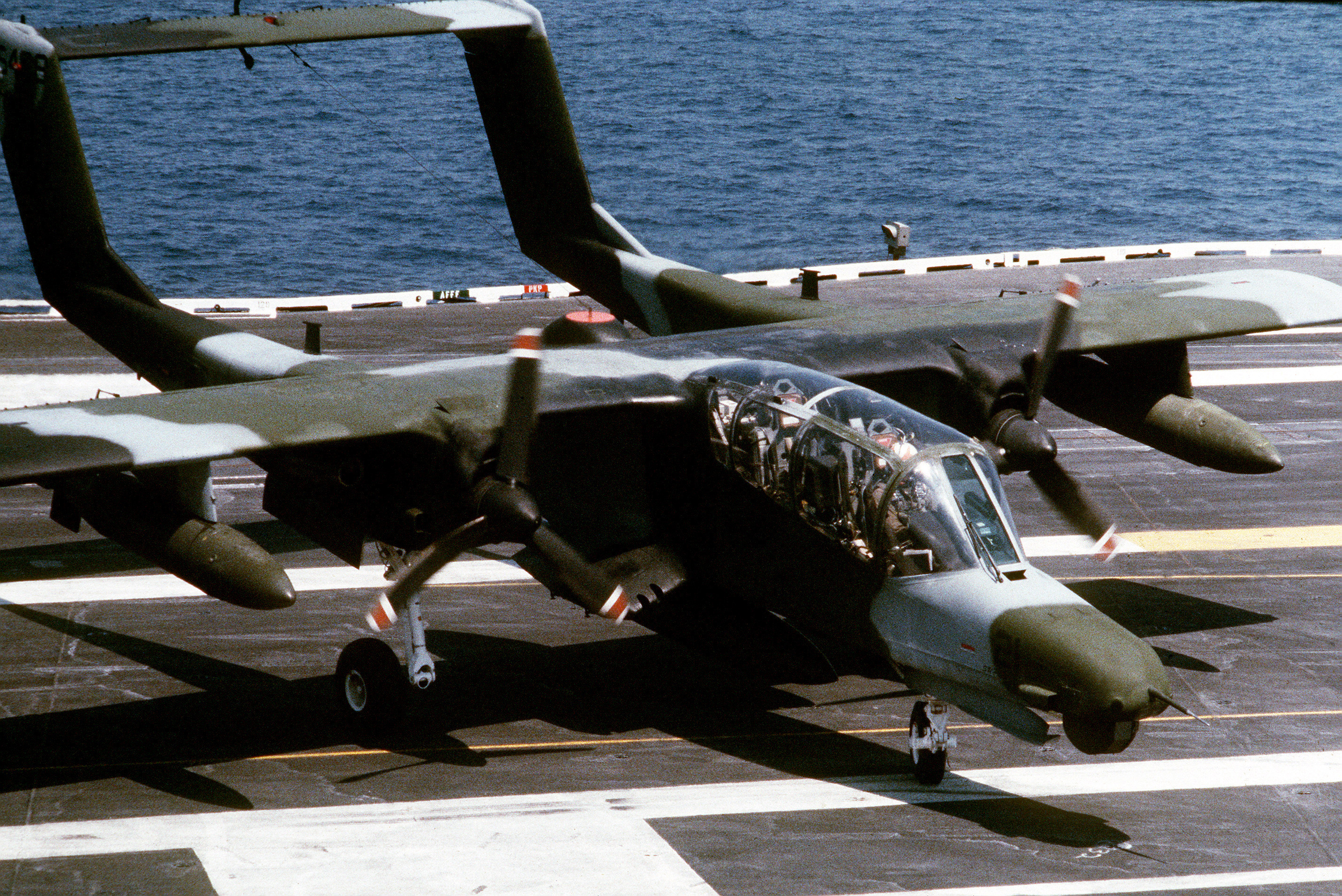
An OV-10D during trials aboard USS Saratoga in 1985

OV-10D
Second generation Bronco developed under the NOGS program. The D-model was an extensively modified OV-10A airframe, adding a forward-looking infrared night-vision system with a turret-mounted camera under an extended nose, visually distinct from the short rounded nose of the A-model. The D also has bigger engines and larger fiberglass propellers. Other noticeable external differences are the chaff dispensers installed midway down the booms and infrared-suppressive exhaust stacks (which mix the exhaust with colder air to reduce the aircraft's heat signature). 17 modified from OV-10A.
OV-10D+
The next USMC upgrade, consisting of A and D aircraft being extensively reworked at MCAS Cherry Point Naval Air Rework Facility with new wiring and strengthened wings. Engine instrumentation was changed from round dials to tape readouts.
OV-10E
Export version for Venezuela; based on the OV-10A, 16 built.
OV-10F
Export version for Indonesia; based on the OV-10A, 16 built.
OV-10G+
Designation given to OV-10s loaned from NASA to the United States Special Operations Command for evaluation under the Combat Dragon II as a counter-insurgency aircraft, featuring new Hartzell four-bladed props and an off-the-shelf sensor suite. 3 modified from OV-10D+.
OV-10M (modified)
A four-bladed version of OV-10A; modified to accommodate bigger engines with larger fiberglass props. Equipped with square chaff dispensers midway down the booms and with new wiring and strengthened wings. Engine instrumentation was changed from round dials to tape readouts by Marsh Aviation for the Philippine Air Force. Capability to deliver GBU-12 Paveway II and GBU-49 Enhanced Paveway II smart bombs were integrated in 2012.

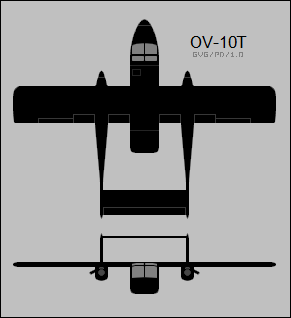
The proposed OV-10T

OV-10T
Proposed cargo version of the OV-10, capable of carrying 8–12 troops or 4,500 pounds (2,000 kg) of cargo, studied during the Vietnam War but not developed.

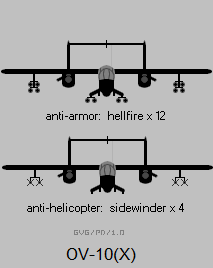
Armament options proposed for the OV-10X

OV-10X
Proposed version for the USAF's Light Attack/Armed Reconnaissance contract. In 2009 Boeing put together plans internally to build a modernized, improved version of the Bronco, called the OV-10X, to satisfy a possible USAF requirement for a light attack plane. According to Pentagon and industry officials, while the aircraft would maintain much of its 1960s-vintage rugged external design, modernizations would include a computerized glass cockpit, intelligence sensors and smart bomb-dropping capabilities. Boeing indicated in 2009 that international interest in restarting production is growing, to compete with other light attack aircraft such as the T-6B Texan II, A-67 Dragon and EMB 314 Super Tucano.
B.J.5
(Thai: บ.จ.๕) Thai designation for the OV-10C.

== Operators ==
United States

- NASA

=== Civil operators ===
United States

- Blue Air Training acquired seven OV-10D+ and G aircraft in March 2020, for use in Joint terminal attack controller training.
- OV-10 Squadron: an organization restoring seven OV-10D Broncos at Chino Airport, California. Their first restored Bronco 155493 took flight in July 2019.
- CAL FIRE
- Beaufort County Mosquito Control, Beaufort County, South Carolina

=== Former operators ===
Colombia

- Colombian Air Force

Indonesia

- Indonesian Air Force

Morocco

- Royal Moroccan Air Force

Philippines

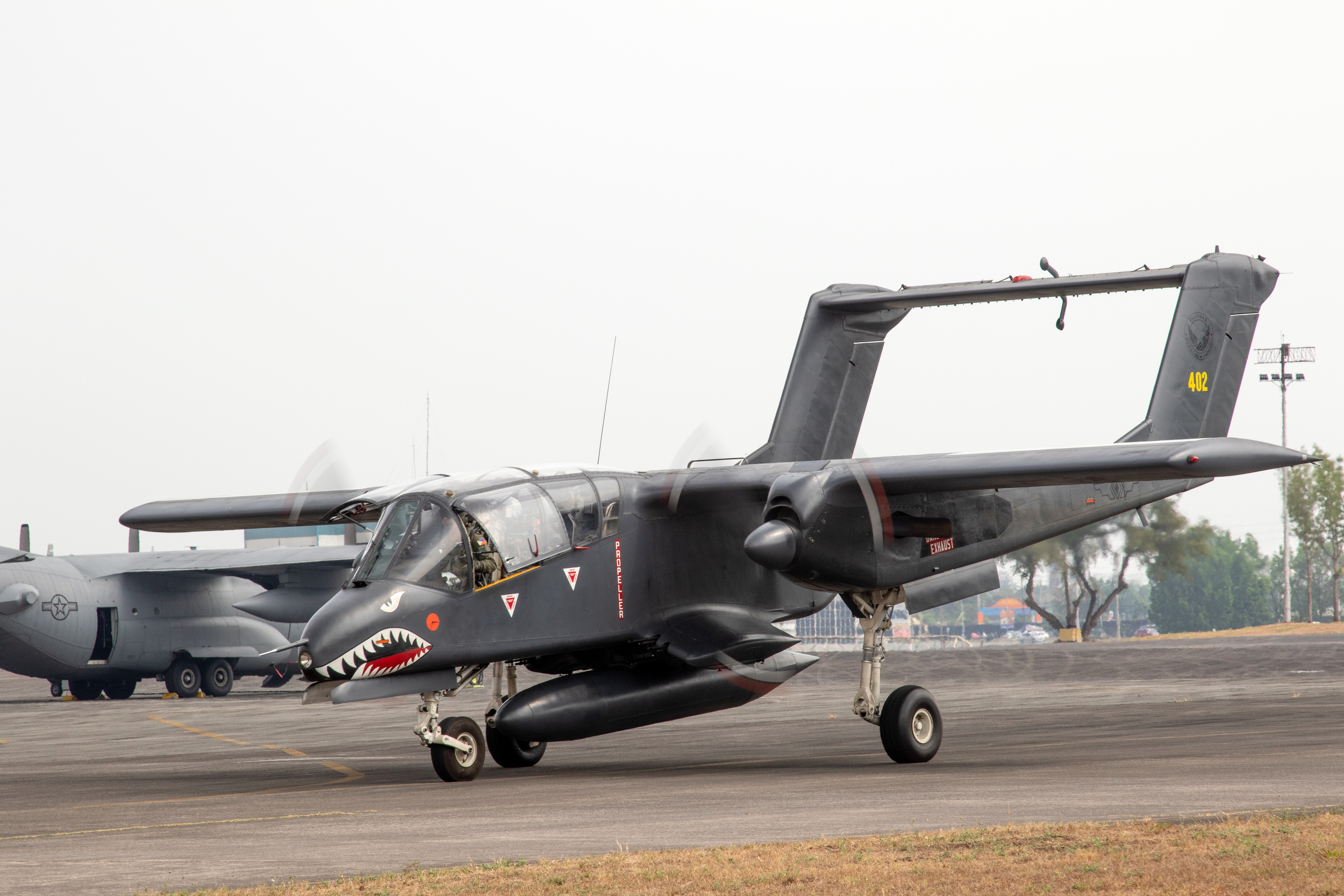
An OV-10 Bronco of the Philippine Air Force (PAF) during Balikatan 2019

- Philippine Air Force

Thailand

- Royal Thai Air Force

United States

- United States Air Force
- United States Navy
- United States Marine Corps

Venezuela

- Venezuelan Air Force

West Germany

- German Air Force

== Aircraft on display ==
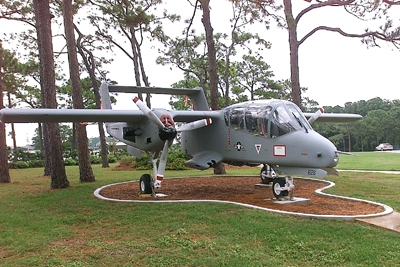
An OV-10 on static display at Hurlburt Field Air Park, Florida

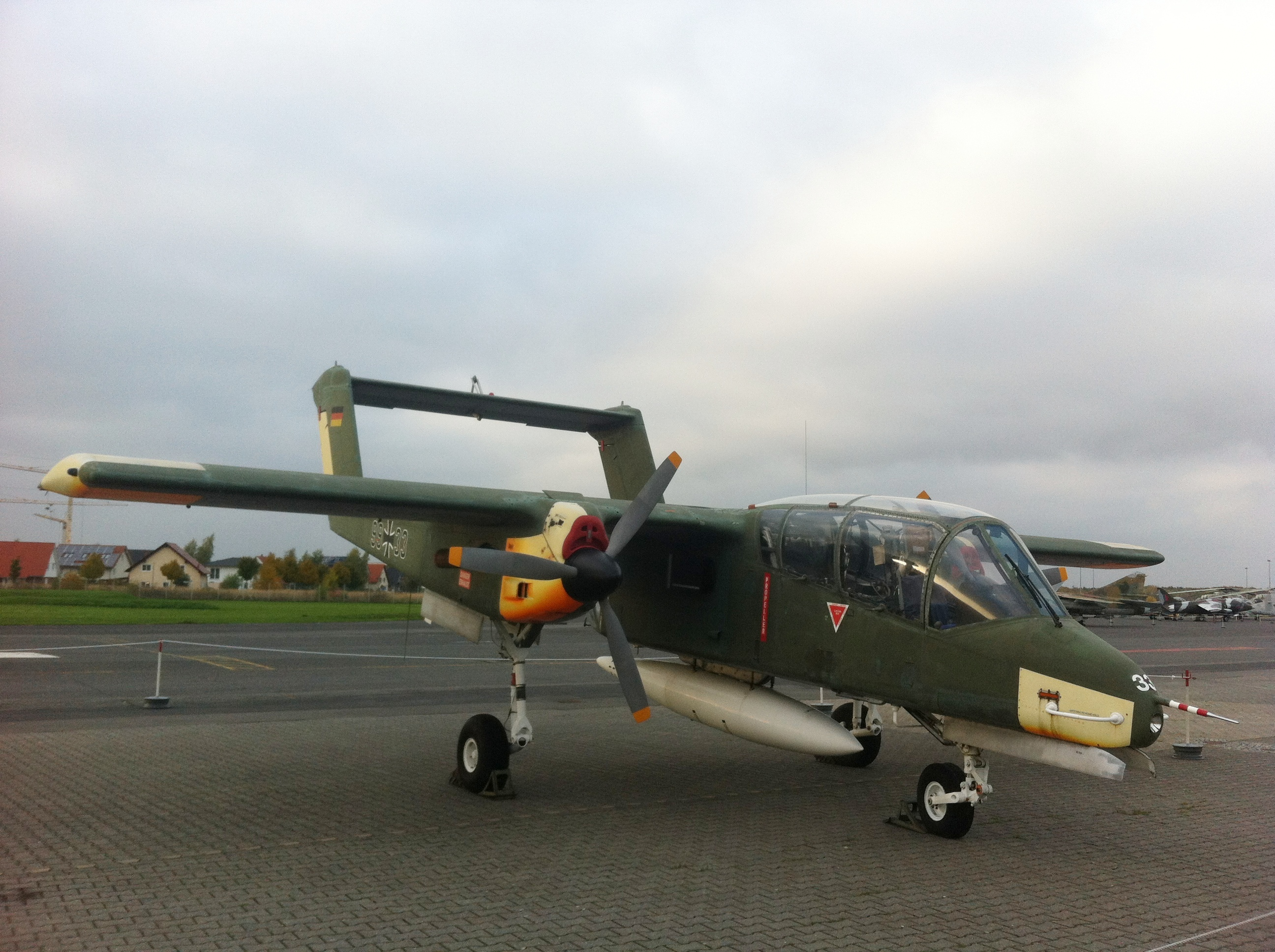
OV-10 Bronco at RAF Gatow, Berlin, Germany

=== Australia ===
- 67-14639 – OV-10A at the Australian War Memorial in Canberra. Ex-Philippine Air Force aircraft donated by the Republic of the Philippines.

=== Belgium ===
- 158294/99+18 – OV-10B at Wevelgem, Belgium. Operated by the Bronco Demo Team as G-ONAA. Previously on display at the Internationales Luftfahrtmuseum Pflumm.

=== France ===
- 158300/99+24 – OV-10B at the Musee Europeen de l'Aviation de Chasse, Registered as F-AZKM. On 19 June 2026, during landing training ahead of the Antidotum 2026 Air Show in Leszno, Poland, the aircraft failed to deploy its landing gear and was substantially damaged. The pilot sustained minor injuries. As of 23 June 2026, the aircraft is planned to be cosmetically restored and retained at Leszno Airport as a static display following an initial damage assessment.
- 158303/99+27 – OV-10B on display at the Musee Europeen de l'Aviation de Chasse.

=== Germany ===
- 158292/99+16 – OV-10B on display at Flugausstellung Hermeskeil in Hermeskeil, Rhineland-Palatinate
- 158297/99+21 – There is an ex-Bundeswehr OV-10B on outdoor display at the Militärhistorisches Museum der Bundeswehr in Dresden, Germany.
- 158309/99+33 – OV-10B on display at the Militärhistorisches Museum Flugplatz Berlin-Gatow

=== Indonesia ===
- TT-1004 – OV-10F at Karjono Park, Banjarnegara Regency, Central Java
- TT-1006 – OV-10F on display next to the major intersection at Jombang Regency, East Java
- TT-1008 – OV-10F at Soesilo Soedarman Museum, Cilacap Regency, Central Java
- TT-1010 – OV-10F at Museum Bhakti TNI, Cilangkap, East Jakarta, Jakarta
- TT-1012 – OV-10F on display near Trunojoyo Airport, Sumenep, Madura Island, East Java
- TT-1013 – OV-10F on display at Satriamandala Museum, Kuningan, South Jakarta
- TT-1015 – OV-10F at the Dirgantara Mandala Museum, Sleman Regency, Special Region of Yogyakarta

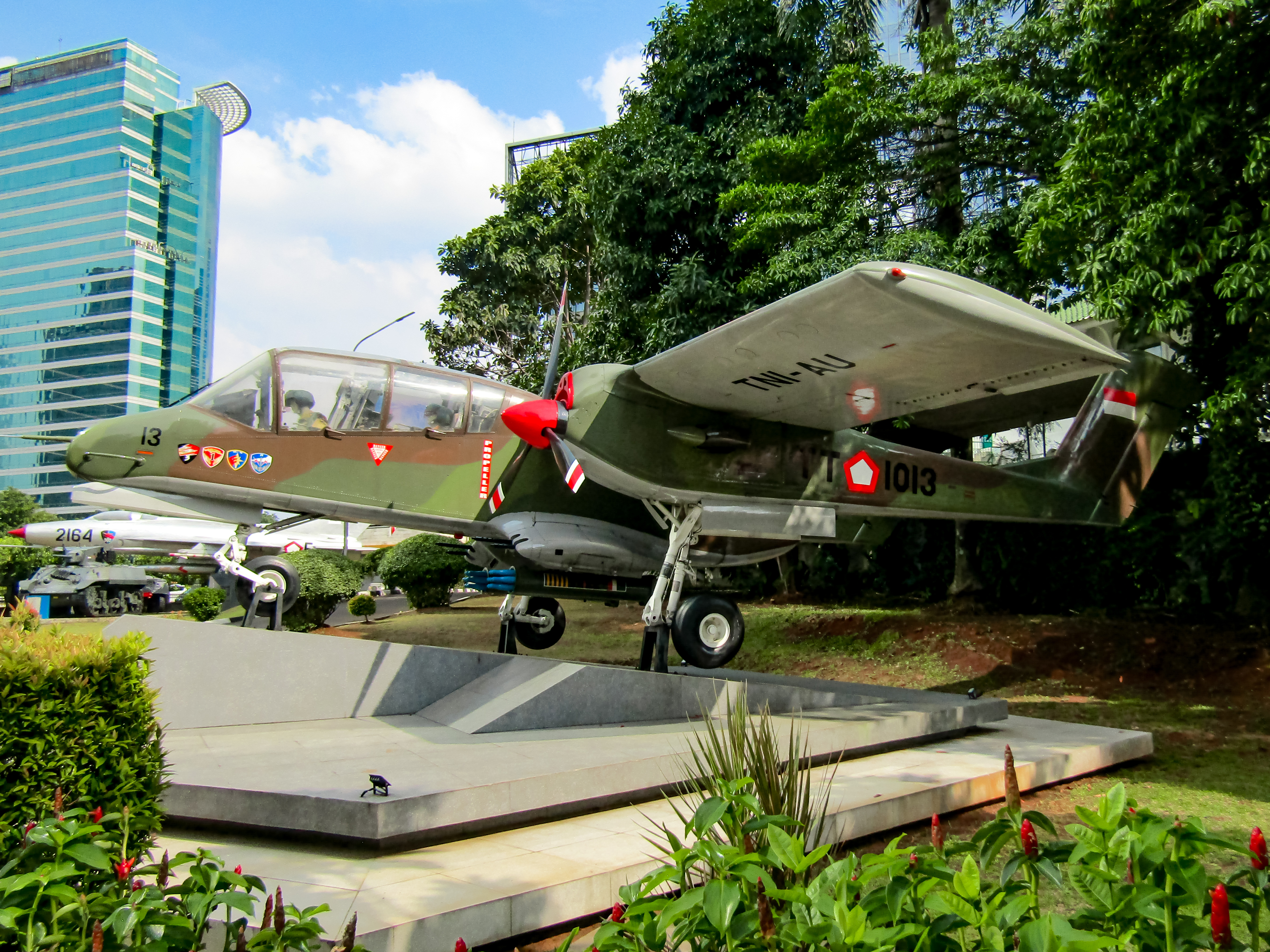
Indonesian Air Force OV-10F Bronco TT-1013 at Satriamandala Museum

- TT-1016 – OV-10F on display at Abdul Rachman Saleh AFB, Malang, East Java

=== Thailand ===
- 158405 – OV-10C with Royal Thai Air Force markings is on display at the Royal Thai Air Force Museum in Bangkok.
- An OV-10C is on static display next to the main gate at Wing 5 in the town of Prachuap Khiri Khan about four hours South of Bangkok. It is open to the public every day.
- 158138 – Unidentified variant OV-10 on static display at Kasetsart University in Sakon Nakhon province.

=== United Kingdom ===
- 158302/99+26 – OV-10B under restoration to airworthiness at Duxford, England. Owned by the Bronco Demo Team.
- 158308/99+32 – OV-10B at Duxford, England. Operated by the Bronco Demo Team as G-BZGK. This aircraft crashed at Cotswold Airport on 10 July 2012.

=== United States ===
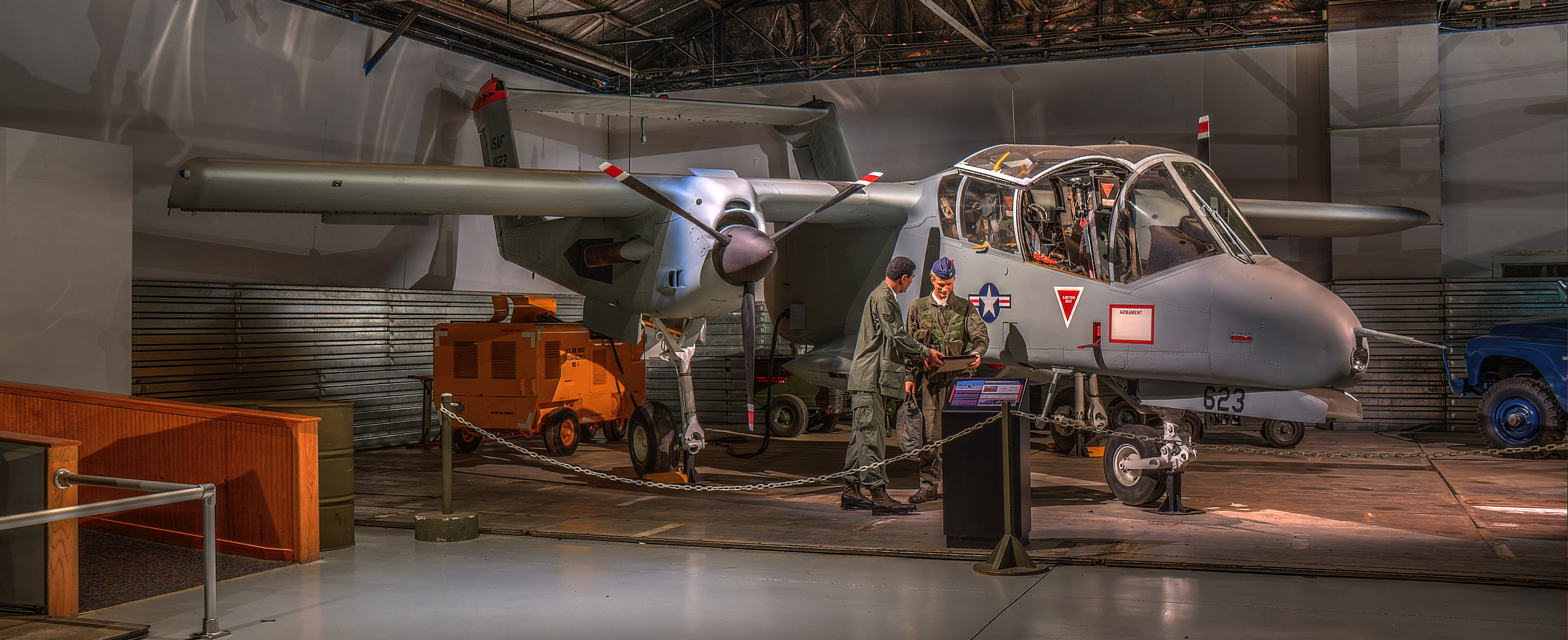
OV-10 Bronco display at the Museum of Aviation, Robins AFB

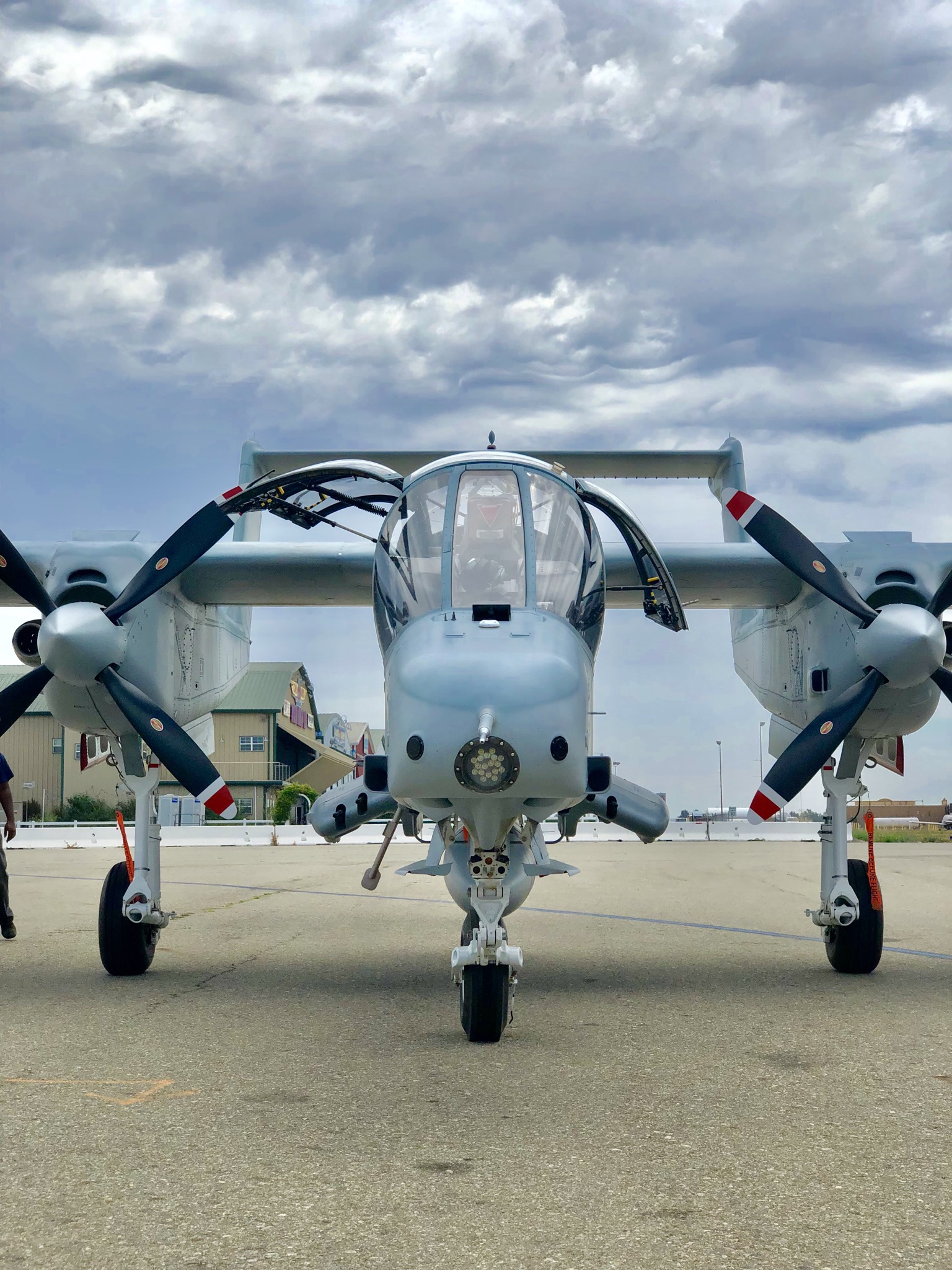
OV-10D+ Bureau Number 155493, restored by OV-10 Squadron.

- The production mockup of the OV-10A, c/n NAA-001, made in Columbus, Ohio, is on display at the Fort Worth Aviation Museum, Fort Worth, Texas, along with two other OV-10s.
- 67-14623 – An OV-10A is on display at the Museum of Aviation, Robins AFB, Georgia.
- 67-14675 – An OV-10A is on display at the Hill Aerospace Museum, at Hill Air Force Base, near Roy, Utah
- 67-14626 – An OV-10A is on display at the Hurlburt Field Air Park at Hurlburt Field, Florida
- 68-03787 – An OV-10A is on display at the National Museum of the United States Air Force at Wright-Patterson AFB near Dayton, Ohio
- 68-03825 – An OV-10A is on display at the Fort Worth Aviation Museum, Fort Worth, Texas.
- 152880 – OV-10D on display outdoors at Mid-America Air Museum, Liberal, Kansas. This aircraft was originally a YOV-10A.
- 152881 – One of the original prototype YOV-10As was on display at the Yankee Air Museum at Willow Run Airport near Ypsilanti, Michigan. It had been fully restored by a former OV-10 crew chief. The aircraft was destroyed along with several other museum aircraft in a fire on 9 October 2004.
- 155409 – An OV-10D is on display at the Valiant Air Command Warbird Museum at Space Coast Regional Airport in Titusville, FL. This aircraft previously served with Marine Observation Squadron TWO (VMO-2) and was later transferred to the U.S. Department of State Air Wing at nearby Patrick Space Force Base, Florida.
- 155426 – An OV-10A in USMC markings is on display at the Fort Worth Aviation Museum, Fort Worth, Texas.
- 155472 – An OV-10D in Navy markings is on display at the National Naval Aviation Museum at NAS Pensacola, Florida. This OV-10 was received by the NNAM on 21 October 2004 when it was transferred from the National Museum of the Marine Corps at MCB Quantico, Virginia. BuNo 155472 was originally an OV-10A which flew with VAL-4 during the Vietnam War, but was later transferred to the USMC and upgraded to OV-10D standard in 1991. Bureau Number 155472 is currently repainted and displayed in the scheme of VAL-4. Formerly on display at the Carolinas Aviation Museum.
- 155484 - An OV-10D is airworthy at the Planes of Fame Air Museum.
- 155494 – An OV-10D in USMC markings is on display at the Flying Leathernecks Museum at MCAS Miramar, California.
- 155499 – An OV-10D with Marine Observation Squadron 1 (VMO-1) markings is on display at the Pima Air & Space Museum, adjacent to Davis-Monthan AFB in Tucson, Arizona. It is on loan from the National Naval Aviation Museum and the National Museum of the Marine Corps.
- 158301/99+25 – OV-10B flying for the Cactus Air Force museum. This aircraft has been reconfigured as an OV-10A.
- 158304/99+28 – OV-10B flying for Stallion 51 at Kissimmee Gateway Airport in Kissimmee, Florida. This aircraft has been reconfigured as an OV-10A.

== Specifications (OV-10D) ==
North American Rockwell OV-10A Bronco

Data from Jane's All the World's Aircraft 1984-85

General characteristics

- Crew: 2
- Capacity: cargo compartment for personnel (no seats) or 3,200 lb (1,451 kg) of freight
- Length: 44 ft 0 in (13.41 m)
- Wingspan: 40 ft 0 in (12.19 m)
- Height: 15 ft 2 in (4.62 m)
- Wing area: 291.0 sq ft (27.03 m^{2})
- Airfoil: NACA 64A315
- Empty weight: 6,893 lb (3,127 kg)
- Gross weight: 9,908 lb (4,494 kg)
- Max takeoff weight: 14,444 lb (6,552 kg) (overload)
- Fuel capacity: 252 US gal (210 imp gal; 950 L) internal
- Powerplant: 2 × Garrett T76-G-420/421 turboprop engines, 1,040 shp (780 kW) each equivalent
- Propellers: 3-bladed Hamilton Standard, 8 ft 6 in (2.59 m) diameter constant-speed fully feathering propellers

Performance

- Maximum speed: 250 kn (290 mph, 460 km/h) at sea level
- Combat range: 198 nmi (228 mi, 367 km)
- Ferry range: 1,200 nmi (1,400 mi, 2,200 km) with auxiliary fuel
- Service ceiling: 30,000 ft (9,100 m)
- Rate of climb: 3,020 ft/min (15.3 m/s)
- Take-off run: 740 ft (226 m)
- Take-off distance to 50 ft (15 m): 1,120 ft (341 m)
- Take-off distance to 50 ft (15 m): 2,800 ft (853 m) at MTOW
- Landing run: 740 ft (226 m)
- Landing run: 1,250 ft (381 m) at MTOW
- Landing distance from 50 ft (15 m): 1,220 ft (372 m)

Armament

- Guns: 1 × 20 mm (0.79 in) M197 electric cannon (YOV-10D) or 4 × 7.62×51 mm M60C machine guns (OV-10D/D+)
- Hardpoints: five on the fuselage and two underwing , with provisions to carry combinations of:
  - Rockets: 7- or 19-tube launchers for 2.75 in (70 mm) FFARs/WAFARs or 2- or 4-tube launchers for 5 in (127 mm) FFARs or WAFARs
  - Missiles: AIM-9 Sidewinder on wings only
  - Bombs: up to 500 lb (227 kg)

== See also ==
Aircraft of comparable role, configuration, and era

- Convair Model 48 Charger
- FMA IA 58 Pucará
- Fairchild Republic A-10 Thunderbolt II (OA-10 version)
- Grumman OV-1 Mohawk
- Soko J-20 Kraguj

Related lists

- List of non-carrier aircraft flown from aircraft carriers
- List of military electronics of the United States
