= Lockheed CL-760 =

Observation and light attack aircraft design

General information
- Type: Light attack and observation aircraft
- National origin: United States
- Designer: Lockheed
- Status: Never entered service
- Number built: 1+

The Lockheed CL-760 was a proposed American light attack and observation aircraft designed by Lockheed in the 1960s for the United States military's Light Armed Reconnaissance Aircraft program. It was a twin-turboprop, counter-insurgency aircraft that featured high speed and good ground attack performance. However, the design was ultimately rejected due to insufficient cargo capacity, and the contract was instead awarded to the North American OV-10 Bronco.

== Development ==
During World War II, the US Marine Corps heavily relied on its own aircraft to provide close air support. Aside from aircraft that carried out airstrikes, it also used smaller aircraft to spot targets and guide in attack aircraft. These light aircraft, such as the Stinson L-5, Cessna О-15, and North American LT-6, were never intended for the role. In 1959, the Corps began a study to develop a light aircraft that could participate in air assaults by observing and attacking the enemy. These aircraft were to operate from underdeveloped forward airfields with little maintenance capabilities and be able to carry a diverse array of weapons. The Department of Defense supported the project, and believed the aircraft could be used as a counter-insurgency aircraft by allies and as an attack aircraft for the Army.

In 1963, the Army, Navy, Marine Corps, and Air Force put out requirements for the Light Armed Reconnaissance Aircraft program. The aircraft, among other requirements, had to operate from aircraft carriers or airstrips and carry 2,000 pounds (910 kg) of cargo in the fuselage, such as six paratroopers or stretchers. Eleven companies submitted designs. The submission from Lockheed was assigned the model number CL-760 and was powered by two 600 shaft horsepower (450 kW) Garrett T76 turboprop. The design featured a hallow fuselage that could carry 8 infantrymen with blisters on the side that held the landing gear and four 7.62 mm (0.300 in) machine guns. Additional weapons could be attached under the fuselage or wings, and the cockpit had seats for two pilots. The design had a wingspan of 30 feet (9.1 m), length of 40.3 feet (12.28 m), empty weight of 5,106 pounds (2,316 kg), fully loaded weight of 9,270 pounds (4,200 kg), and a top speed of 325 miles per hour (523 km/h). At least one prototype was built and used as a demonstrator.

Compared to the competitors, the CL-760 was the most compact and fastest as Lockheed used the layout of a standard aircraft. The Navy praised it for the ability to take off from helicopter carriers and performance in light-attack missions, but found the cargo capacity lacking. Lockheed's choice of layout deprioritized passengers, as the company thought the requirement was secondary. Instead, it was the reason why the design was rejected, with the contract awarded to North American's NA-300, which entered service as the OV-10 Bronco.
