= List of Wyoming companies =

Location of Wyoming

Wyoming is a state in the mountain region of the western United States. The mineral extraction industry, including oil and gas, is the main driver of the Wyoming economy, accounting for more than three-fifths of the state's revenues. Travel and tourism is the second-largest sector in the state, providing $3.3 billion to the state's economy, with $170 million in tax revenues in 2015, along with 32,000 jobs. Primary tourism draws are natural, including Yellowstone National Park and Grand Teton National Park.

Wyoming is one a few states that does not levy a corporate income tax and is often cited as a "pro-growth" state for its business tax climate.

== Notable firms ==
This list includes notable companies with primary headquarters located in the state. The industry and sector follow the Industry Classification Benchmark taxonomy. Organizations which have ceased operations are included and noted as defunct.

Notable companies Status: P=Private, S=State; A=Active, D=Defunct
Name	Industry	Sector	Headquarters	Founded	Notes	Status	
Asthmatic Kitty	Consumer services	Broadcasting & entertainment	Lander	1999	Record label	P	A
Aviat	Industrials	Aerospace	Afton	1985	Sport and utility aircraft	P	A
Bighorn Airways	Consumer services	Airlines	Sheridan	1947	Airline	P	A
Call Aircraft Company	Consumer services	Airlines	Afton	1939	Airline	P	A
Cloud Peak Energy	Basic materials	Coal	Gillette	2009	Coal mining	P	A
Firehole Composites	Industrials	Business support services	Laramie	2000	CAD and consulting	P	A
Freedom Arms	Consumer discretionary	Recreational products	Freedom	1978	Firearms	P	A
Fremont Motors Corporation	Consumer services	Specialty retailers	Lander	1938	Auto retailer	P	A
Gillette News-Record	Consumer services	Publishing	Gillette	1904	Daily newspaper	P	A
Great Lakes Airlines	Consumer services	Airlines	Cheyenne	1977	Defunct 2018	P	D
Intermountain Manufacturing Company	Industrials	Aerospace	Afton	1962	Defunct 1966, merged into Aero Commander	P	D
Lunavi	Technology	Internet	Cheyenne	2007	Managed hosting	P	A
Mesa Natural Gas Solutions	Oil & gas	Oil equipment & services	Casper	2014	Natural gas equipment	P	A
Rio Tinto Energy America	Basic materials	General mining	Gillette	1993	Part of Rio Tinto (Australia)	P	D
Roberts Aircraft	Industrials	Aerospace	Cheyenne	1939	Aircraft leasing, operations	P	A
Taco John's	Consumer services	Restaurants & bars	Cheyenne	1969	Mexican food chain	P	A
Teton Gravity Research	Consumer services	Broadcasting & entertainment	Jackson Hole	1996	Sports media	P	A
Tom Balding Bits & Spurs	Industrials	Industrial suppliers	Sheridan	1984	Metalworks, related to horse tack	P	A
Weatherby	Consumer discretionary	Recreational products	Sheridan	1945	Firearms and ammunition	P	A

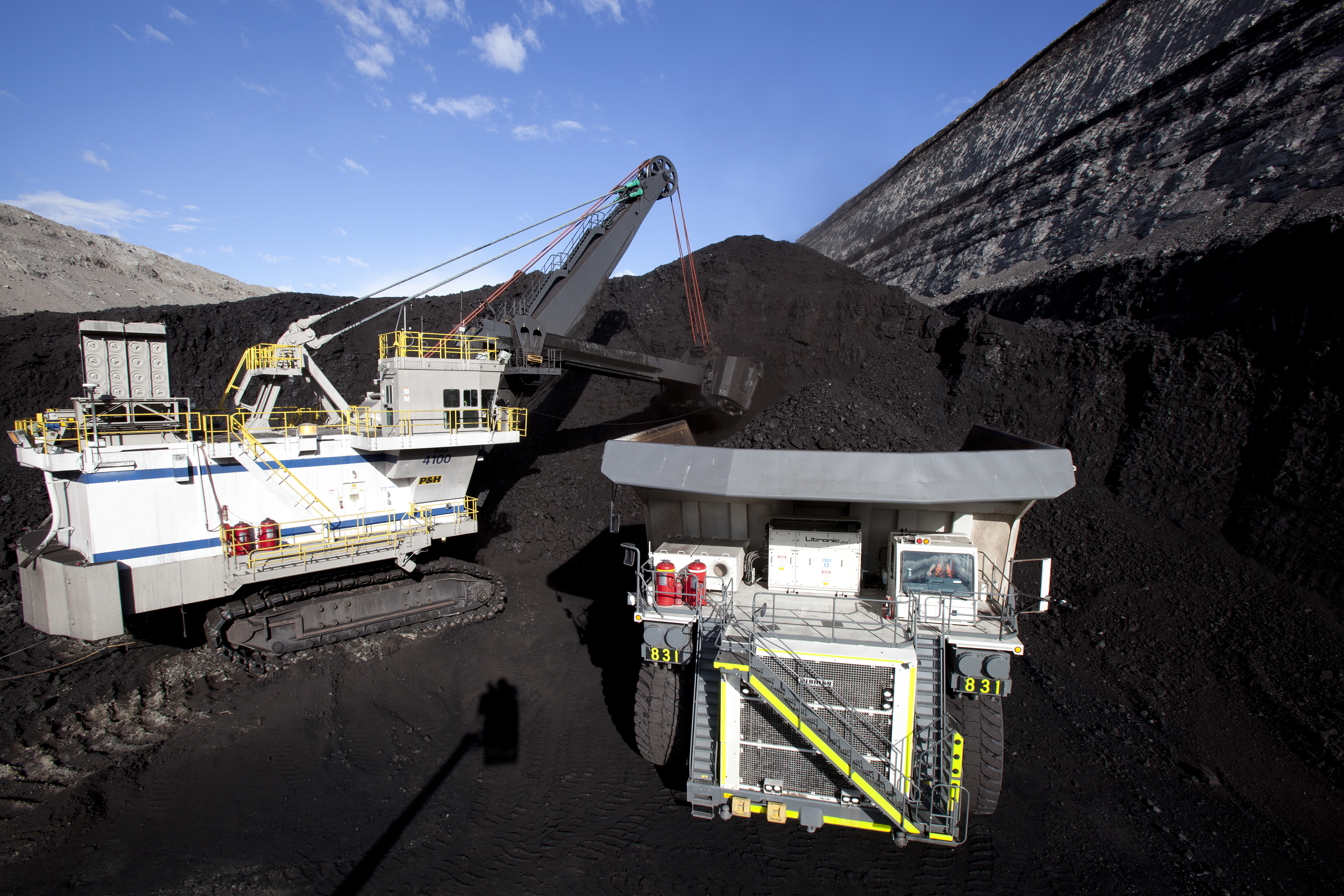
The North Antelope Rochelle Mine one of the largest coal mines in the world.

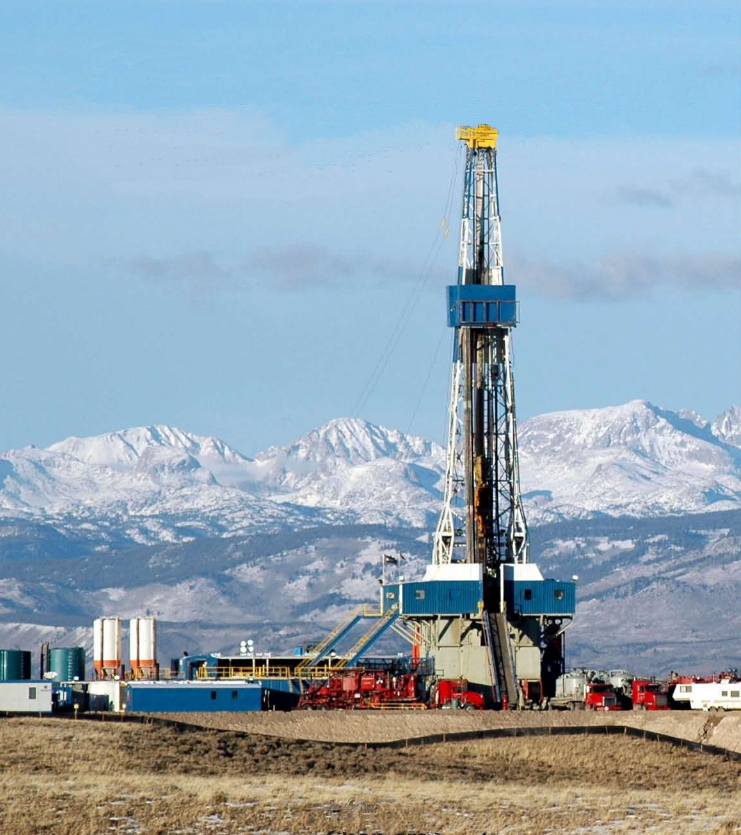
A drilling rig near the Wind River Range.

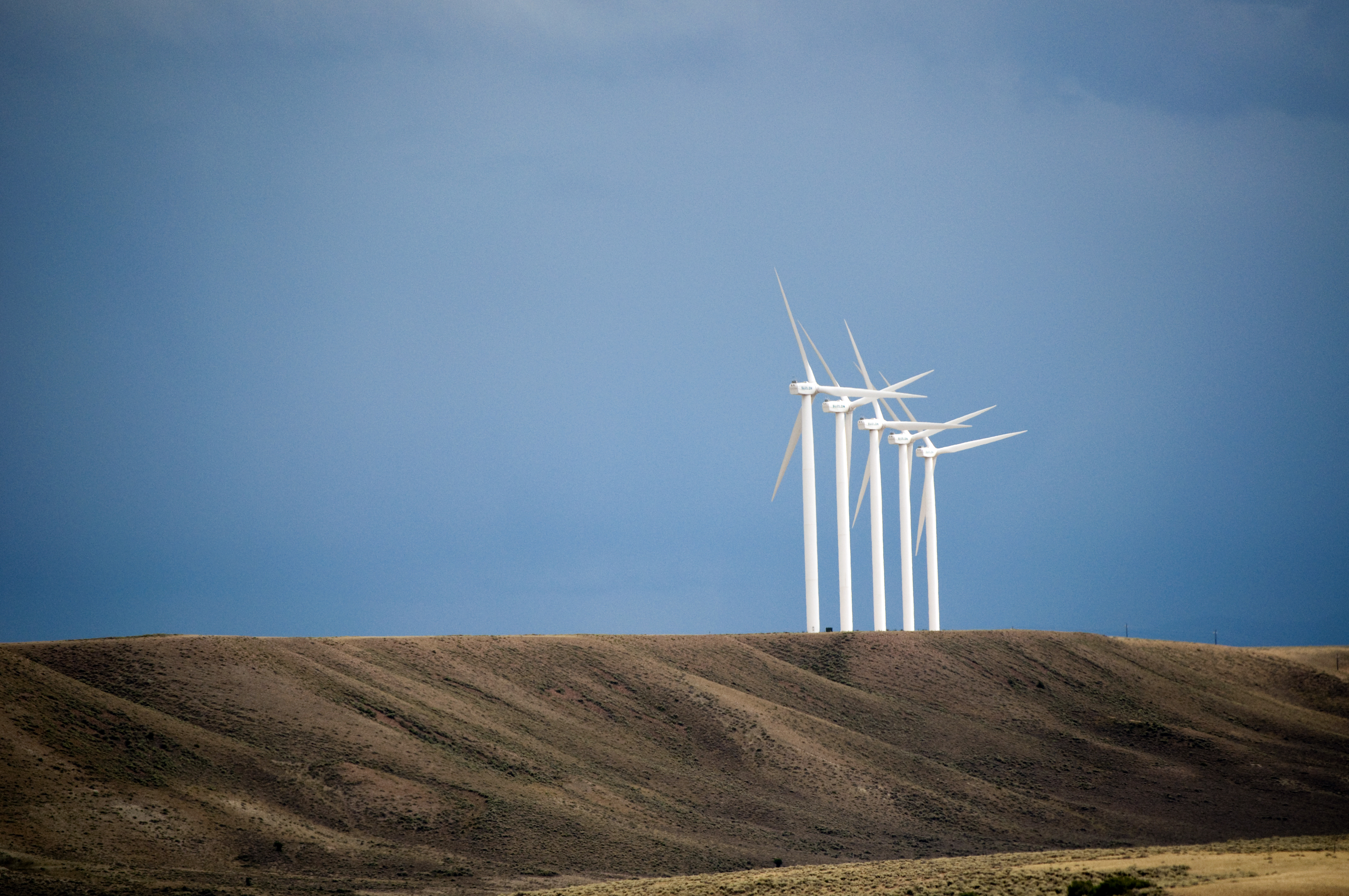
Wind farm in Uinta County.

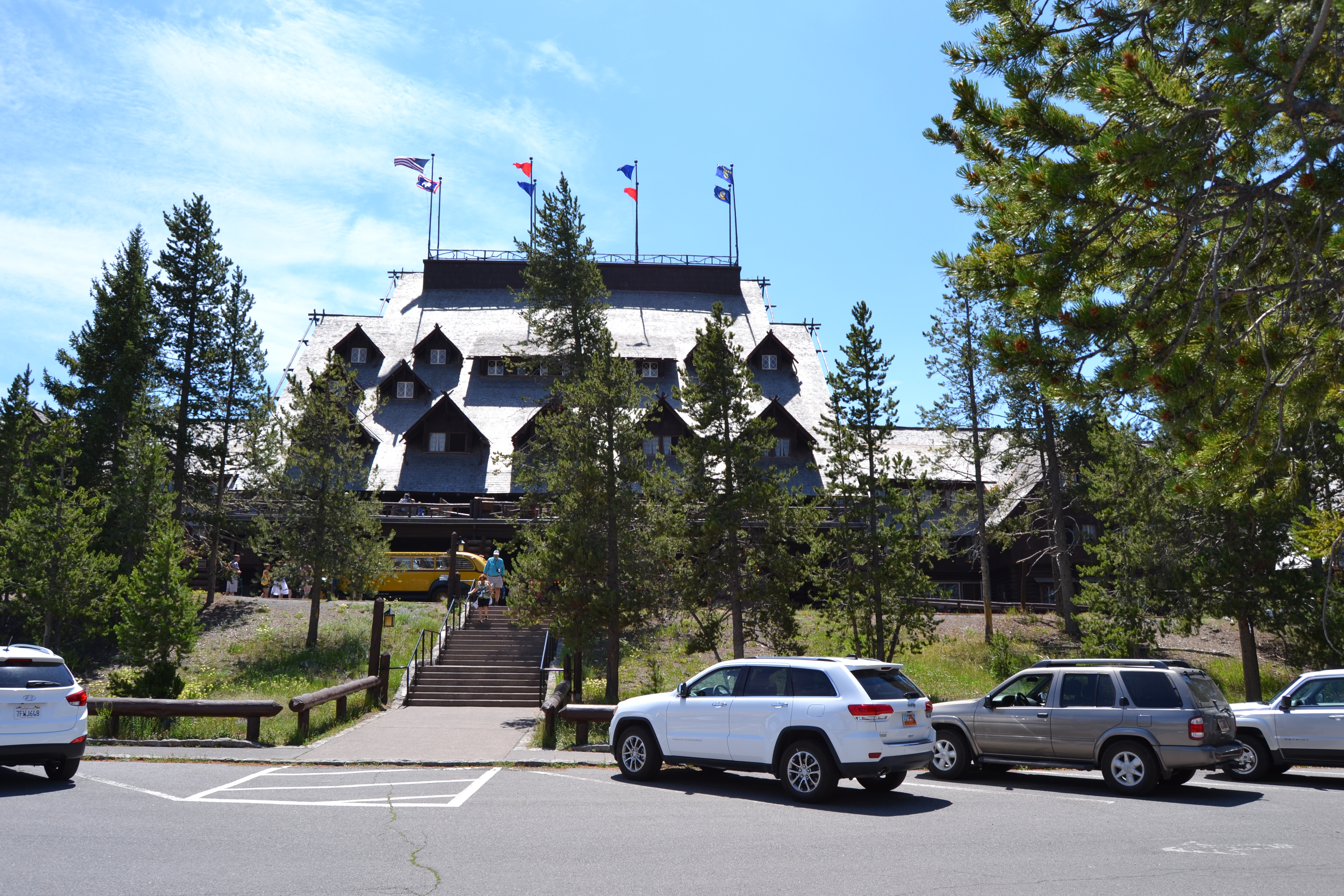
The Old Faithful Inn in Yellowstone National Park.
