= Leland Snow =

Snow Aeronautical and Air Tractor founder

- Born: Henry Leland Snow; May 31, 1930; Brownsville, Texas
- Died: February 20, 2011 (aged 80); Wichita Falls, Texas
- Occupation: Aeronautical engineer
- Known for: Founder of Snow Aeronautical and Air Tractor
- Spouse: Nancy Lynn Bacon (m. 1964)
- Children: 2

Leland Snow (May 31, 1930 – February 20, 2011) was an American aeronautical engineer known for designing and developing agricultural aircraft. He was the founder and president of both Snow Aeronautical (in 1956), and Air Tractor (1972).

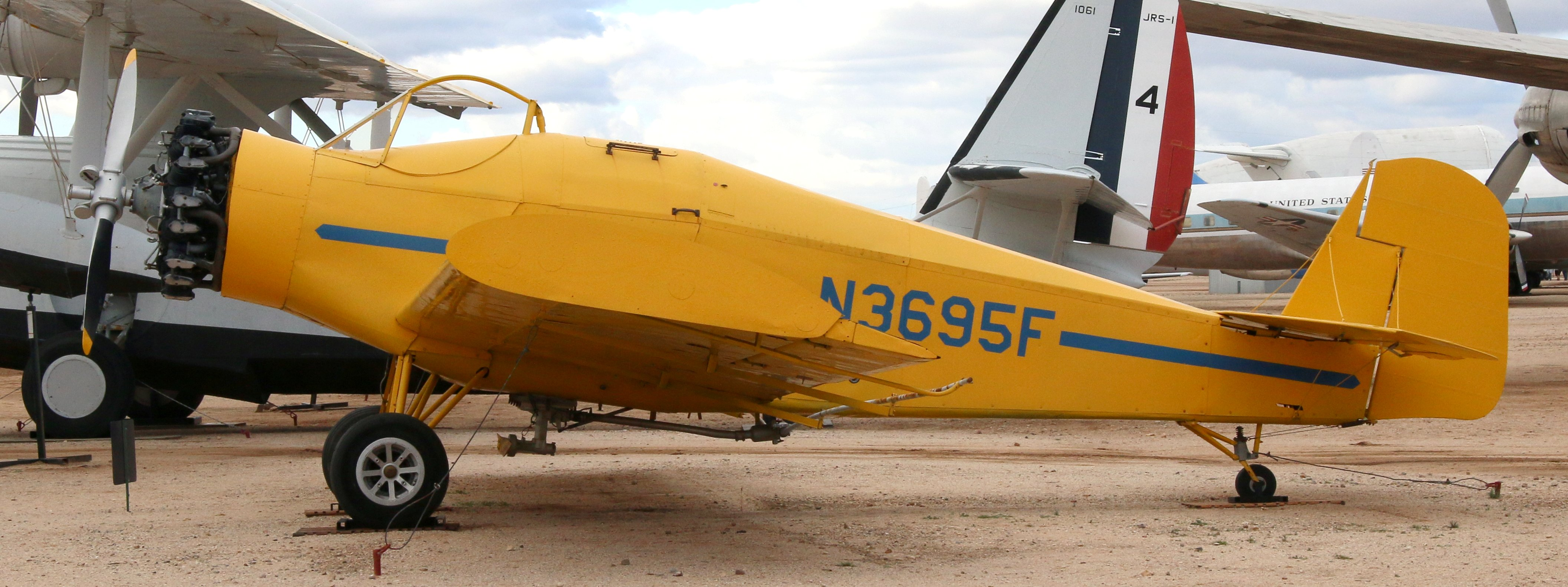
An early Snow S2A crop duster, with forward mounted cockpit, at Pima Air Museum

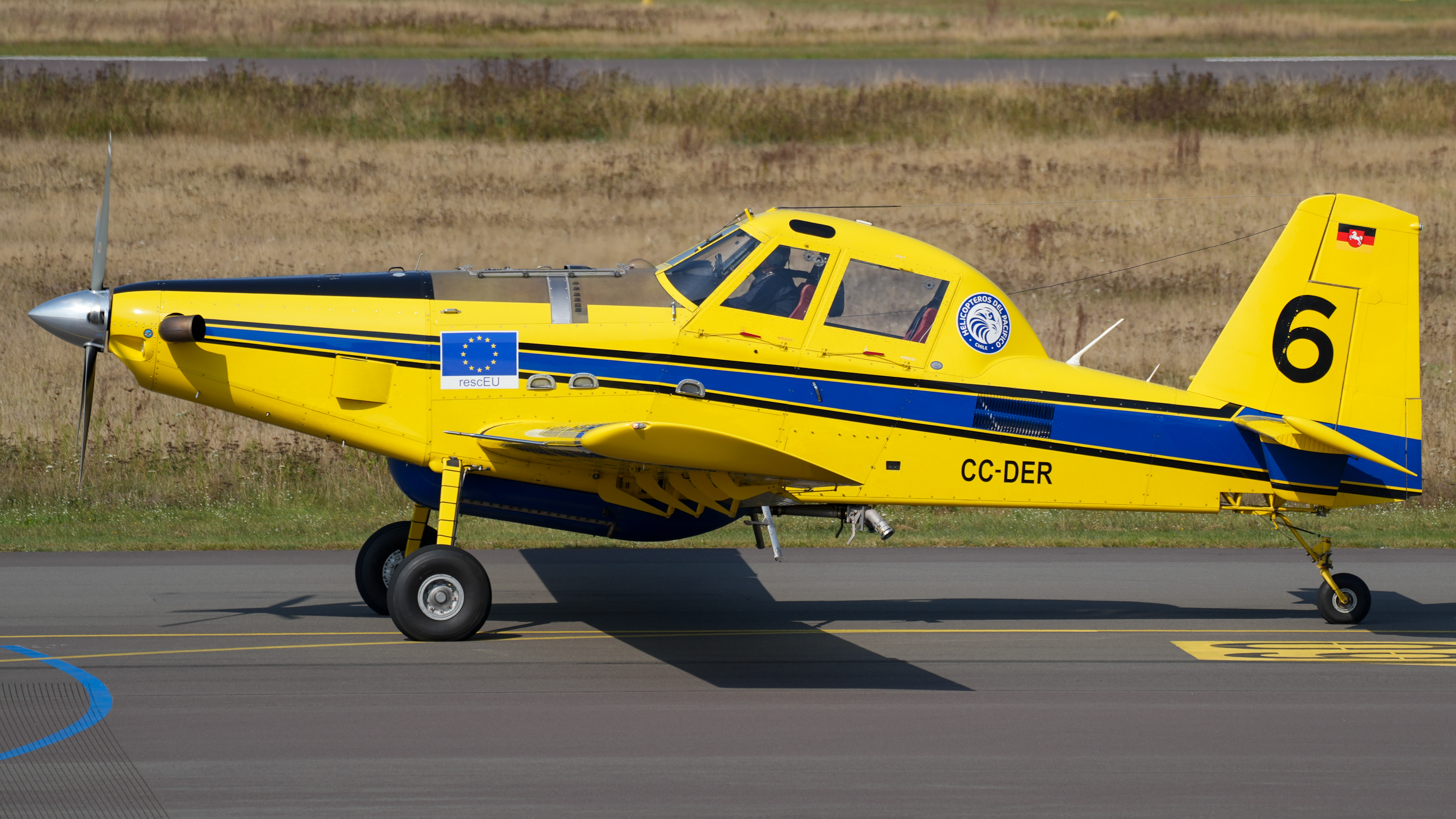
One of Snow's later designs, a Pratt & Whitney PT-6A turboprop powered Air Tractor AT-802, registered in Chile, but seen in Germany on loan to rescEU for firefighting duties, 2024

Snow began designing the Snow S-1 crop duster aircraft in 1951 when he was 21 years old. By 1953 the aircraft was completed and test flown, and Snow began dusting and spraying both in Texas and elsewhere. After four years of field trials, Snow founded the Snow Aeronautical Company and started production of the Snow S-2 at Olney, Texas. Snow sold the company to Rockwell-Standard in 1965, and as part of the deal became vice president of its Aero Commander division, manufacturers of a whole range of general aviation aircraft.

Rockwell continued production at Olney for a while, initially marketing the aircraft as the S-2D Ag Commander, and with further improvements and production moved to Georgia, it became the Rockwell S-2R Thrush Commander. In 1977 the design was sold on the Ayres Corporation who produced it as the Ayres S-2R Thrush, and in 2003 after yet another transfer and further modifications, an aircraft based on the original Snow design saw it manufactured and sold as the Thrush Corporation 510 (Note: each subsequent change of manufacturer saw more derivatives, different engine options, and increased tank capacities, and eventually a name that omits the '"S-2" element, but all can be traced back to the Snow S-2) where it was still in production in 2024, over 60 years after its first flight.

Meanwhile, back in 1970, with Rockwell's S-2R production moved to Georgia, Leland Snow resigned as Vice-President, allowing him to found Air Tractor Inc in 1972, back once again at Olney, Texas. His design for their first aircraft was obviously influenced by his experience with the S-2, but the AT-300 required a new type certificate, awarded in 1973. Snow continued to expand the company and the range of aircraft produced, right up until his death on February 20, 2011, in Wichita Falls, Texas.
