= Ayres Thrush =

American agricultural aircraft

Thrush
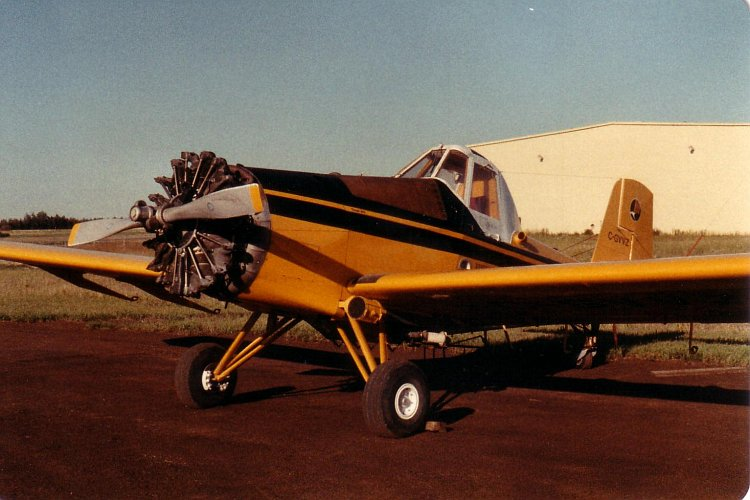
- The radial engine powered Ayres S-2R Thrush

General information
- Type: Aerial application aircraft
- Manufacturer: Ayres Corporation; Thrush Aircraft
- Designer: Leland Snow
- Status: In production
- Number built: less than 2,000

History
- Manufactured: 1956-present
- First flight: 1956

The Ayres Thrush, formerly the Snow S-2, Aero Commander Ag Commander, and Rockwell Thrush Commander, is an American agricultural aircraft produced by Ayres Corporation and more recently by Thrush Aircraft. It is one of the most successful and long-lived agricultural application aircraft types in the world, with almost 2,000 sold since the first example flew 70 years ago. Typical of agricultural aircraft, it is a single-seat monoplane of conventional taildragger configuration. Originally powered by a radial piston engine, most examples produced since the 1980s have been turboprop-powered.

== Design and development ==
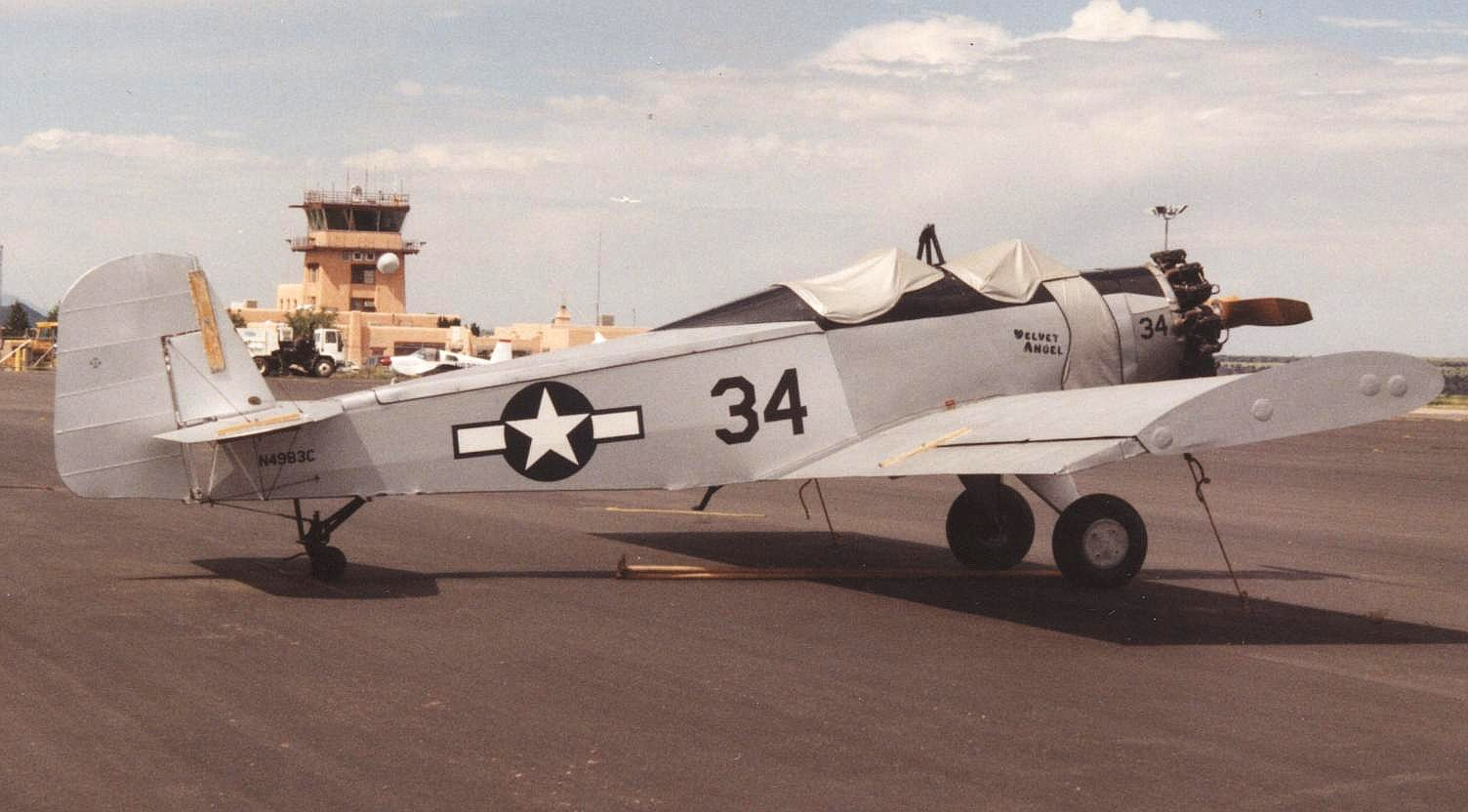
Early Snow S-2A of 1959 with open cockpit and roll-over protection bar at Santa Fe, New Mexico, June 1997, in pseudo-USAAF markings

The Thrush, designed by Leland Snow, first flew in 1956 and before long was being produced in series as the S-2 by the company he founded, Snow Aeronautical. In 1965, the corporation and all of its assets were purchased by the Aero Commander division of Rockwell, which put it into production alongside the CallAir A-9 that it had also acquired, branding both unrelated (though similar) machines as "Ag Commanders". When Rockwell dropped the Aero Commander brand, the S-2 was renamed the "Thrush Commander".

In 1977, Rockwell sold off the production rights to the aircraft and the production facility at Albany, Georgia, which were purchased by Ayres Corporation, a firm which had been built on retro-fitting turboprop engines to Thrush Commanders. On June 30, 2003, Ayres' assets were purchased by Thrush Aircraft, the current producer of the aircraft.

The S-2 and its several variants have been purchased by agricultural spraying operators in many countries. Large numbers are operated in the United States and Australia, while other countries using the type include Costa Rica, France, Guyana, Iran, Israel, Jamaica, the Netherlands and the United Kingdom.

Ayres developed a special anti-narcotics crop-spraying version of the Turbo-Thrush for the United States Department of State. This version, known as the Narcotics Eradication Delivery System (NEDS) featured an armored cockpit and engine to protect against hostile ground fire. Nine were sold to the Department of State between 1983 and 1985. Ayres also attempted to market a militarized version as the Ayres Vigilante, intended for the Close Air Support role, but this failed to attract customers. IOMAX USA of North Carolina, which had previously modified Air Tractor AT-802 agricultural aircraft as reconnaissance/attack aircraft, has developed the Archangel attack aircraft modeled on the S-2R-660. The United Arab Emirates has ordered 24 Archangels, with delivery from June 2015.

Two Thrush 510Gs were modified to perform a counter-insurgency role by the Austrian company Airborne Technologies at the direction of Erik Prince, the former head of Blackwater, but in the absence of an export license the aircraft have not been used operationally.

== Variants ==
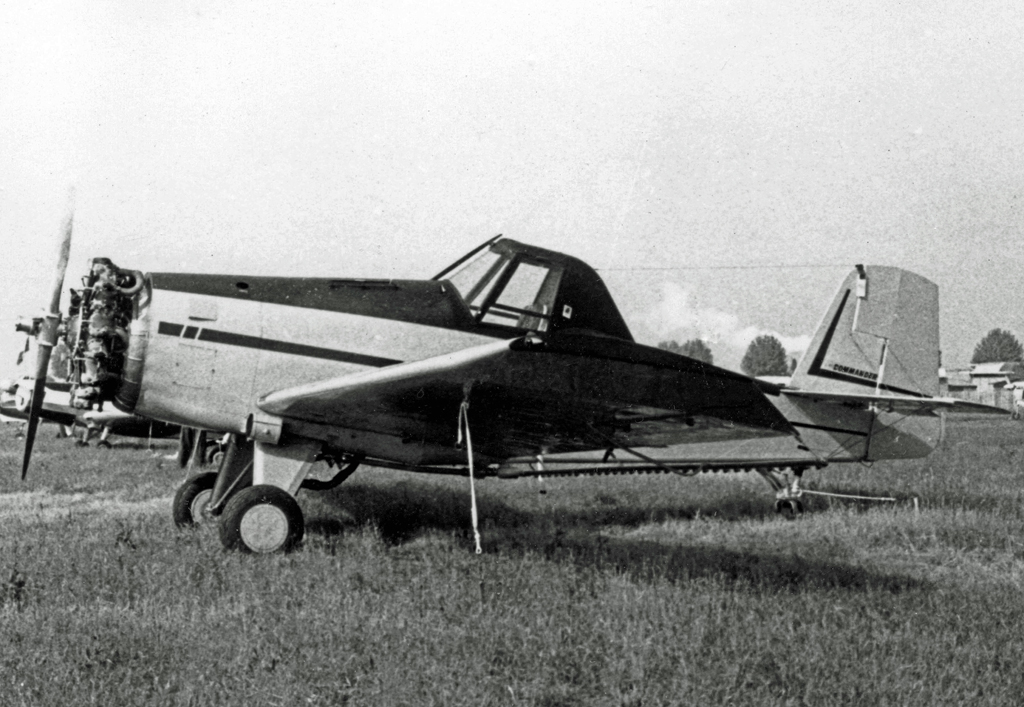
Aero Commander S-2D exhibited at the 1967 Paris Air Show

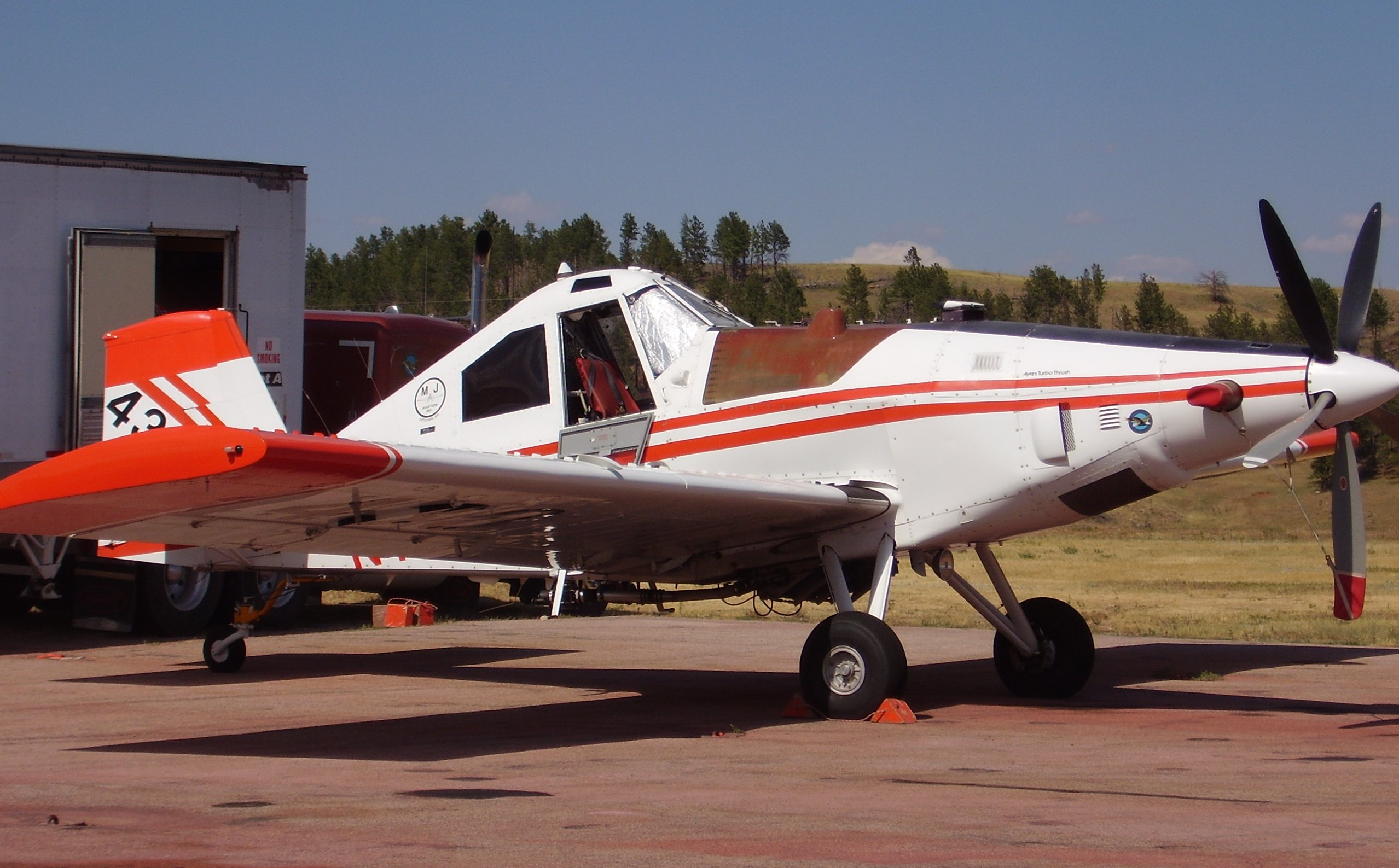
Ayres S2R-T Thrush powered by a Pratt & Whitney Canada PT-6 turboprop

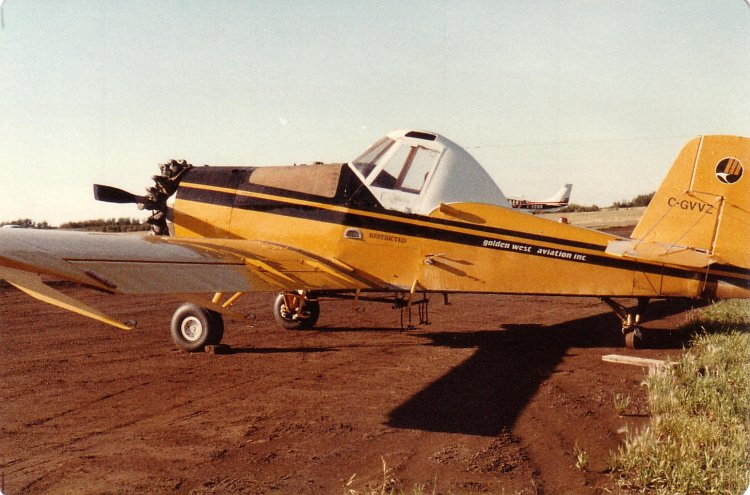
Ayres S-2R Thrush

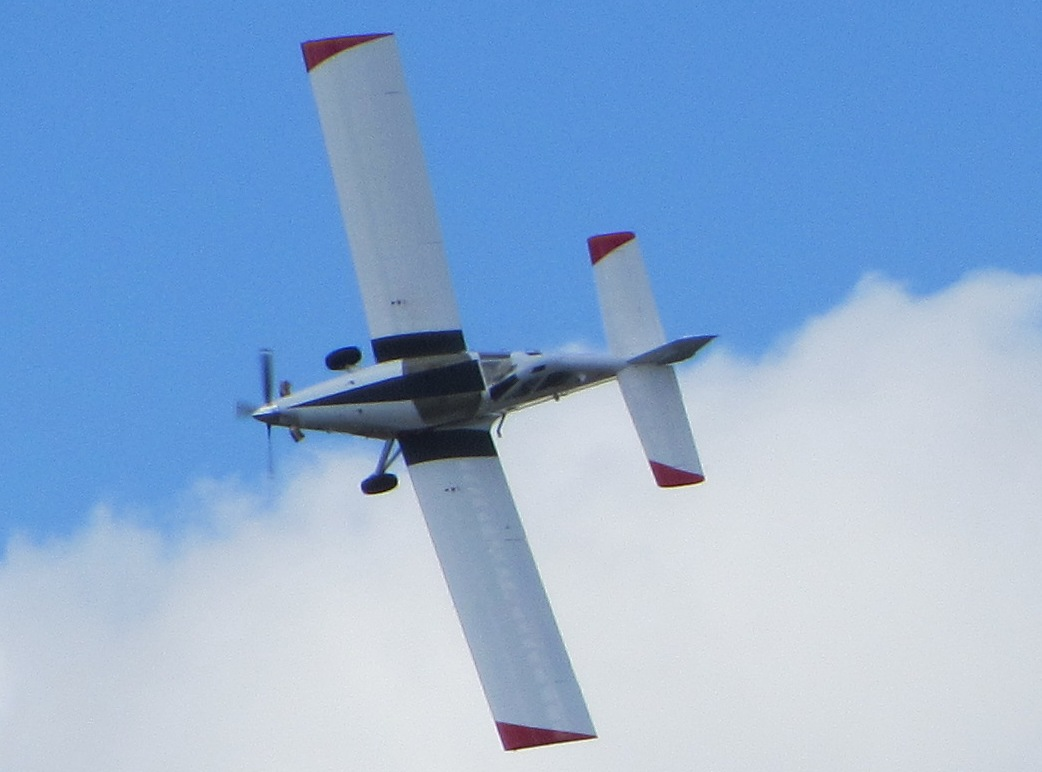
Model 510G

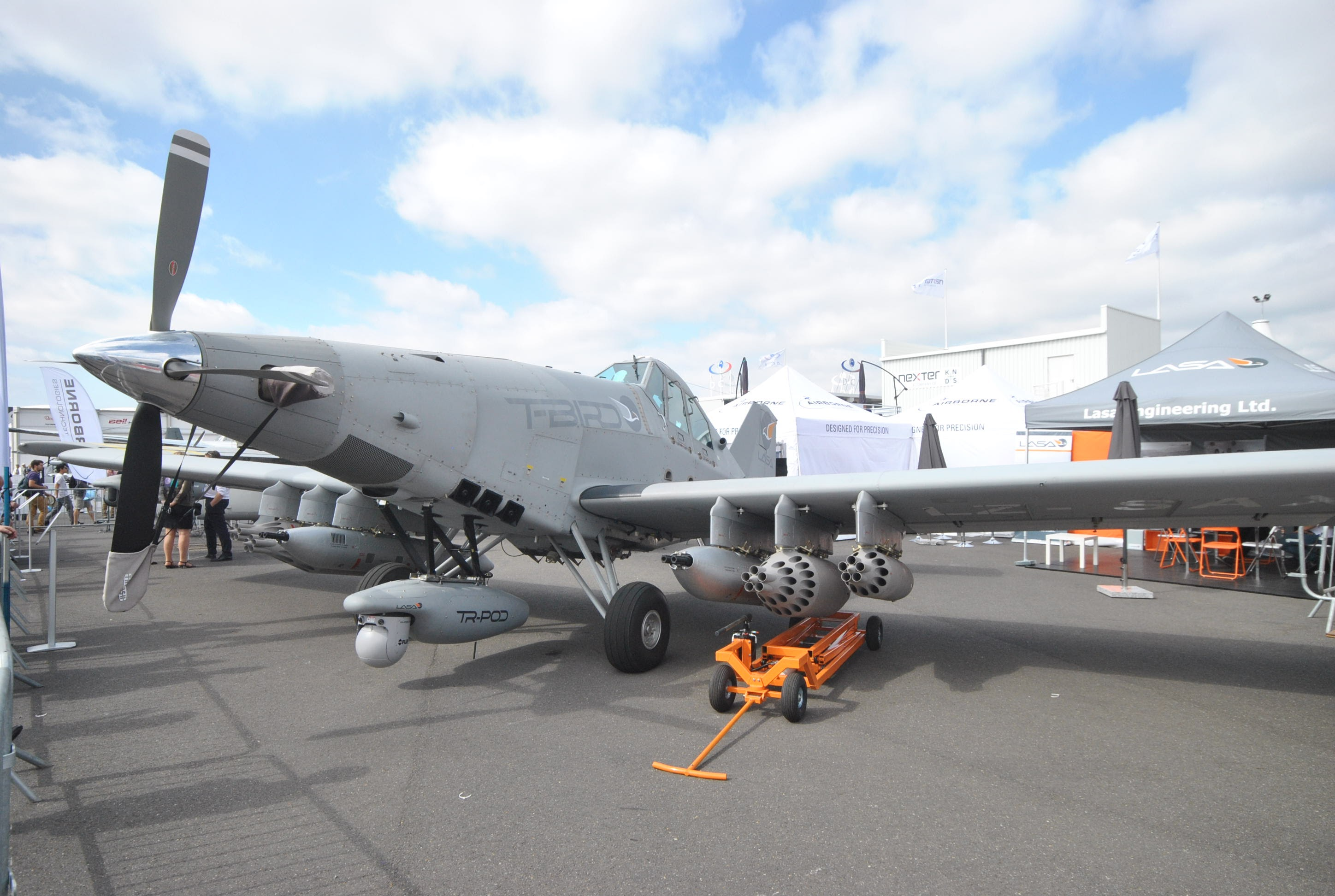
510G armed by Bulgarian LASA Engineering

=== Snow Aeronautical ===
(per Simpson, 2005, p. 39)

S-1
initial prototype with open cockpit.
S-2
pre-production version of S-1 – 3 built.
S-2A
initial production version, powered by Continental engine – 73 built.
S-2B
S-2 powered by 450 hp (340 kW) Pratt & Whitney R-985 – 19 built.
S-2C
refined production version, wingspan increased 4 feet 6 inches (1.37 m) – 214 built.
S-2C-600
S-2C re-engined with Pratt & Whitney R-1340-AN1.
S-2D
6,000 lb (2,700 kg) take-off weight – 105 built.

=== Aero Commander ===
S-2D Ag Commander

=== Rockwell ===
Thrush Commander 600
Thrush Commander 800
powered by Wright R-1300.

=== Marsh ===
S2R-T Turbo Thrush
Rockwell Thrush Commanders converted to turbine power by Marsh Aviation using Garrett AiResearch TPE331-1-101 engines.

=== Ayres ===
S-2R 1340
Equivalent to Thrush Commander 600.
S-2R 1820
Powered by Wright R-1820 Cyclone.
Bull Thrush
Pezetel Thrush
powered by PZL-3.
S-2R-T
turboprop powered versions equipped with Pratt & Whitney Canada PT6A.

==== V-1-A Vigilante ====
Powered by a Pratt & Whitney Canada PT6A it could mount FLIR cameras and could carry up to 1,200 lbs of NATO standard weapons as well as gunpods on six under-wing pylons.

=== Thrush Aircraft ===
Thrush Model 400

Thrush Model 510G
General Electric H80 powered
Thrush Model 510GR
Honeywell TPE331 powered
Thrush Model 510P
Pratt & Whitney Canada PT6A-34 powered
Thrush Model 550
Pratt & Whitney Canada PT6A-65AG powered
Thrush Model 710
Pratt & Whitney Canada PT6A-65AG powered
Archangel
Thrush 550G modified as two-seat armed attack aircraft. 1,600 shp (1,200 kW) PT6A-67F engine. Fitted with 6 hardpoints for 6,000 lb (2,700 kg) of external stores.

== Specifications (Thrush Commander 600) ==
Data from Jane's All The World's Aircraft 1976-77

General characteristics

- Crew: one
- Capacity:
  - 400 US gal (330 imp gal; 1,500 L) liquids or
  - 3,280 lb (1,490 kg) dry chemicals
- Length: 29 ft 2 in (8.89 m)
- Wingspan: 44 ft 4 in (13.51 m)
- Height: 9 ft 2 in (2.79 m)
- Wing area: 326.6 sq ft (30.34 m^{2})
- Empty weight: 3,700 lb (1,678 kg)
- Max takeoff weight: 6,900 lb (3,130 kg)
- Fuel capacity: 106 US gal (88 imp gal; 400 L)
- Powerplant: 1 × Pratt & Whitney R-1340 Wasp 9-cylinder air-cooled radial engine, 600 hp (450 kW)
- Propellers: 2-bladed Hamilton-Standard 12D40 metal constant speed propeller

Performance

- Maximum speed: 140 mph (230 km/h, 120 kn)
- Cruise speed: 124 mph (200 km/h, 108 kn) (70% power)
- Stall speed: 66 mph (106 km/h, 57 kn) (at 6,000 lb (2,700 kg), flaps down)
- Ferry range: 403 mi (649 km, 350 nmi) (70% power)
- Service ceiling: 15,000 ft (4,600 m)
- Rate of climb: 900 ft/min (4.6 m/s)

== See also ==
Related development

- PZL-Mielec M-18 Dromader

Aircraft of comparable role, configuration, and era

- Aero Boero 260AG
- Air Tractor AT-300
- Air Tractor AT-802
- CallAir A-9
- Cessna 188
- Embraer EMB 202 Ipanema
- Grumman Ag Cat
- PAC Cresco
- PAC Fletcher
- Piper PA-25 Pawnee
- PZL-106 Kruk
- Zlin Z-37 Cmelak

== Bibliography ==
- Ayton, Mark. "Archangel: Crop Duster to Tank Buster". Air International, Vol. 92, No. 2, February 2017. pp. 24–33. ISSN 0306-5634.
- Green, William. Aircraft Handbook. London. Macdonald & Co. (Publishers) Ltd., 1964.
- Simpson, Rod. The General Aviation Handbook. Midland Publishing. 2005. ISBN 1-85780-222-5.
- Taylor, John W R. (editor). Jane's All The World's Aircraft 1976-77. London: Jane's Yearbooks, 1976. ISBN 0-354-00538-3.
- Taylor, John W R. (editor). Jane's All The World's Aircraft 1988-89. Coulsdon, Surrey, UK: Jane's Information Group, 1988. ISBN 0-7106-0867-5.
