= Ayres LM200 Loadmaster =

1990s cargo aircraft

LM200 Loadmaster

General information
- Type: Turboprop transport
- National origin: United States
- Manufacturer: Ayres Corp.
- Status: Cancelled
- Number built: 0

The Ayres LM200 Loadmaster was a small cargo aircraft developed in the 1990s by Ayres Corporation largely for the needs of small-package carriers. In 1996, urged on by FedEx Express, development was begun, designed to carry four demi containers. The aircraft was to be powered by a LHTEC CTP800-4T turboprop, which was composed of two CTP800s driving a single five-bladed Hamilton-Standard propeller through a combining gearbox. To support this development effort, Ayres acquired the LET aircraft manufacturing company in the Czech Republic in September 1998. In 2001, the company was forced into bankruptcy when creditors foreclosed on it, and the Loadmaster program was terminated.

== Specifications (LM200, as designed) ==
Data from The International Directory of Civil Aircraft, 2001-2002

General characteristics

- Crew: 1-2 (Aircraft was to have been certified for single pilot operation)
- Capacity: 9,000 lb (4,082 kg) of freight, or up to 34 passengers
- Length: 64 ft 4 in (19.61 m)
- Wingspan: 64 ft 1 in (19.53 m)
- Height: 23 ft (7.0 m)
- Wing area: 458 sq ft (42.5 m^{2})
- Empty weight: 9,000 lb (4,082 kg)
- Max takeoff weight: 19,000 lb (8,618 kg)
- Powerplant: 1 × LHTEC CTP800-4T twin-power-section turboprop powerplant, 2,700 shp (2,000 kW) Comprising two CTS800-derived turboprop engines driving a single propeller through a combining gearbox; 1,350 shp (1,007 kW) with one engine inoperative.

Performance

- Maximum speed: 200 kn (230 mph, 370 km/h)
- Cruise speed: 150 kn (170 mph, 280 km/h)
- Range: 280 nmi (320 mi, 520 km)
- Ferry range: 1,630 nmi (1,880 mi, 3,020 km)

== See also ==
Aircraft of comparable role, configuration, and era

- Cessna 208
