= Rufus Travis Amis =

American entrepreneur

R.T. Amis
- Born: 13 February 1912; Kansas City, Kansas
- Died: 12 January 2007 (aged 94); Omaha, Nebraska
- Occupation: Entrepreneur

Rufus Amis (February 13, 1912 – January 12, 2007) was an American entrepreneur who served as co-founder and CEO of Aero Design and Engineering Company. The company built one of the first twin engine planes for private use in the US, the Aero Commander. An Aero Commander later became distinguished as the smallest plane ever designated Air Force One when President Dwight Eisenhower began using one in 1956. Rufus Amis was also a co-founder and later President of Missouri Valley Machinery Company, a dealer of Caterpillar Equipment and was instrumental in the development of Bellevue College in Nebraska.

== Early life ==
Throughout the early years of his life, Rufus lived with his family on various construction sites. In those days, contractors built large tent camps for their employees and animals on construction sites. Rufus' mother would supervise the preparation of meals for about 200 men through the construction season. In the late 1920s, Amis Construction won a project in central Kansas near the town of Council Grove. The family located there with their teenaged son for the duration of the project. It was there that Rufus met Carolyn Louise Blim. Married in the heart of the Great Depression in 1932, the couple soon had a son named Travis. Their second son Fred was born in 1944. In 1950 Amis partnered with his cousin John E. Amis of Oklahoma City, OK, to purchase majority shares of Dolese Brothers Company. At the time Dolese Brothers was the largest foundation construction company in the United States.

R.T. and Carolyn Amis circa 1950
- R.T. and Carolyn Amis circa 1950
- Died: died

== Later years ==
During the Depression, Rufus and Carolyn lived on construction camp sites across Kansas and Oklahoma. Rufus worked as a foreman and Carolyn helped Rufus' mother cook for the construction crew. When World War II broke out, they moved to Oklahoma City, where Amis Construction had a number of large contracts. The war years were very profitable for Amis Construction and provided the Amis family with the financial basis for future investments. When R.T. Amis Sr. retired in the 1940s, Rufus became a minority partner with his brother, W.D. (Bill) Amis. The two built roads and dams all over the western United States. After the war, Amis Construction joined with Kerr McGee Oil Company and McKnight Construction to build and operate the Downtown Airpark in Oklahoma City. Their involvement with aviation led to their being approached to finance a start-up to manufacture a twin-engine private airplane.

In the early, 1950s Rufus left management at Amis Construction to become President of the new venture, Aero Design and Engineering Company. The new company would build the Aero Commander aircraft in a plant near Oklahoma City. During these years, "Rufe" accumulated nearly ten thousand hours of flight time and covered the country from coast to coast. By the mid-1950s, the company reached the point that it would either have to go public or sell to one of the larger established manufacturers. The Amises elected to sell to Rockwell-Standard Company.

Shortly after selling to Rockwell, Rufus exchanged his interest in Amis Construction for the company's interest in Missouri Valley Machinery Company in Omaha, Nebraska. Amis Construction had helped finance the founding of MVM Co. by Rufe and Bill's older brother, Phillip and two other partners. Established in 1945, MVM sold and serviced Caterpillar construction equipment in western Iowa and northeastern Nebraska. Phillip retired in 1957 and sold his interest to Rufus, who assumed control of MVM. MVM grew to employ 200 parts, service, and sales people in northeastern Nebraska and Western Iowa. Rufe was later joined by his sons, Travis and Fred. The family owned and operated MVM until 1983, when the company was sold and Rufus retired.

== Final years ==
During the 1980s and early 1990s, Rufus traveled extensively and remained active in politics. He took a keen interest in water issues and worked hard to promote the construction of projects to preserve and utilize Nebraska's water. In the mid-1990s, Rufus developed Alzheimer's disease and gradually withdrew from public life. Even so, he continued to go to his office in the old Irvington Ice Cream Parlor until he reached the age of 93. Rufus died on January 12, 2007, at his home in Omaha, Nebraska.
