= Aero Commander 100 =

American light aircraft produced in the 1960s

Aero Commander 100 Darter Commander
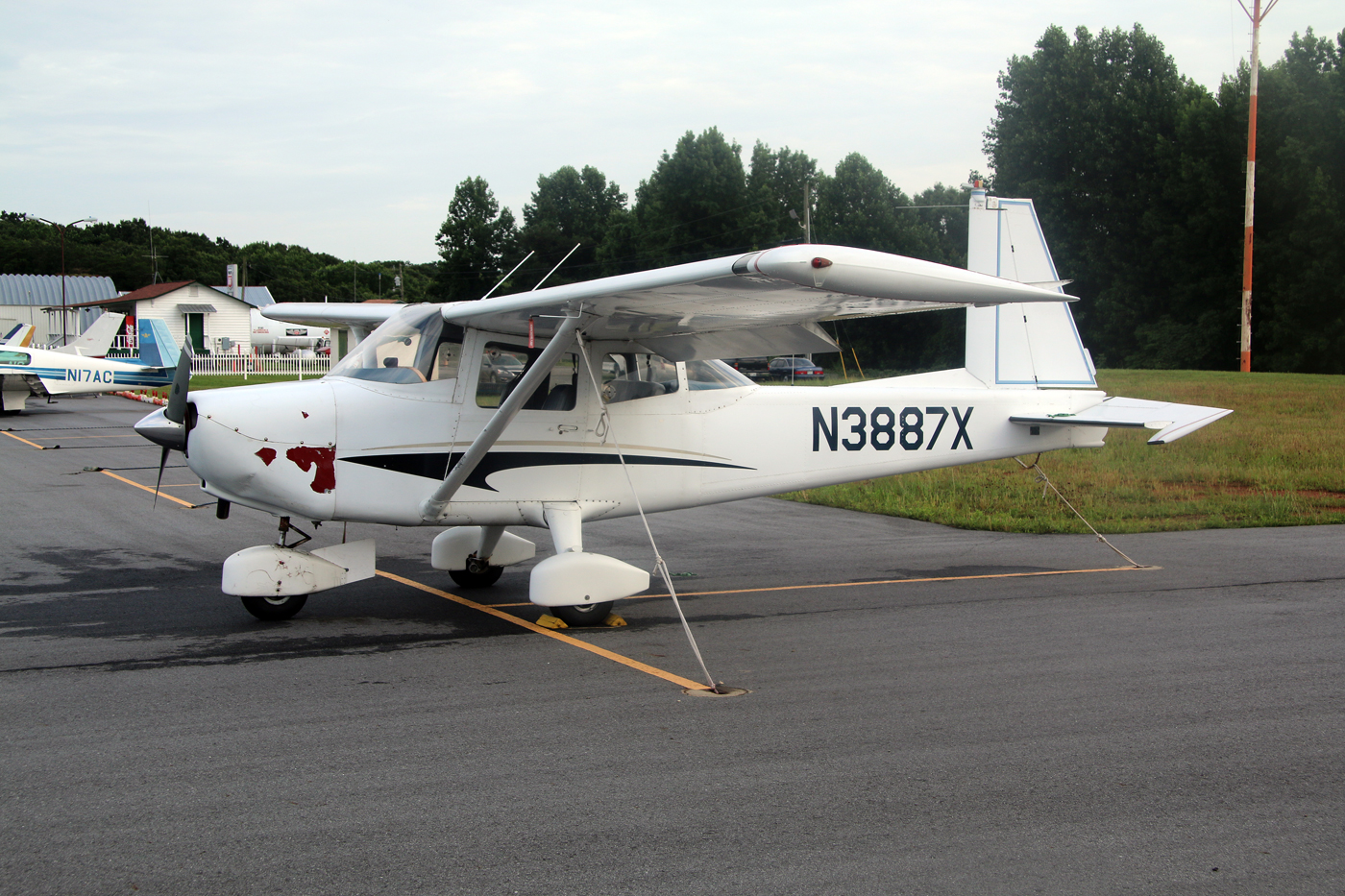
- Aero Commander 100 at Pickens County Airport in July 2015

General information
- Type: Light aircraft
- National origin: United States
- Manufacturer: Volaircraft/Aero Commander

History
- First flight: 1960

The Aero Commander 100, various models of which were known as the Darter Commander and Lark Commander, is an American light aircraft produced in the 1960s. It was a high-wing monoplane of conventional design, equipped with fixed tricycle undercarriage.

== Design and development ==
The aircraft was originally designed by Volaircraft, first flying in 1960. The firm marketed the original three-seat version as the Volaire 1035 and a four-seat version with a more powerful engine as the Volaire 1050 before North American Rockwell purchased all rights to the design on July 12, 1965, for production by its Aero Commander division. Production of the Darter Commander version continued until 1969 and of the revised Lark Commander until 1971 (by which time, Rockwell had dropped the Aero Commander brand name).

A Volaire 1050 was exhibited at the 1966 Hanover Air Show and later sold to Finland. Other examples of the type were exported to Australia and Canada.

Finding the light aircraft market too competitive for its liking, Rockwell ceased production of the Lark Commander in 1971 and sold the rights to all versions of the aircraft to Phoenix Aircraft of Euclid, Ohio, but this company never actually put it into production.

== Variants ==
=== Volaircraft ===
- Model 10 – prototypes
- Volaire 1035 – three-seat production version powered by Lycoming O-290
- Volaire 1050 – four-seat production version powered by Lycoming O-320

=== Aero Commander/Rockwell ===
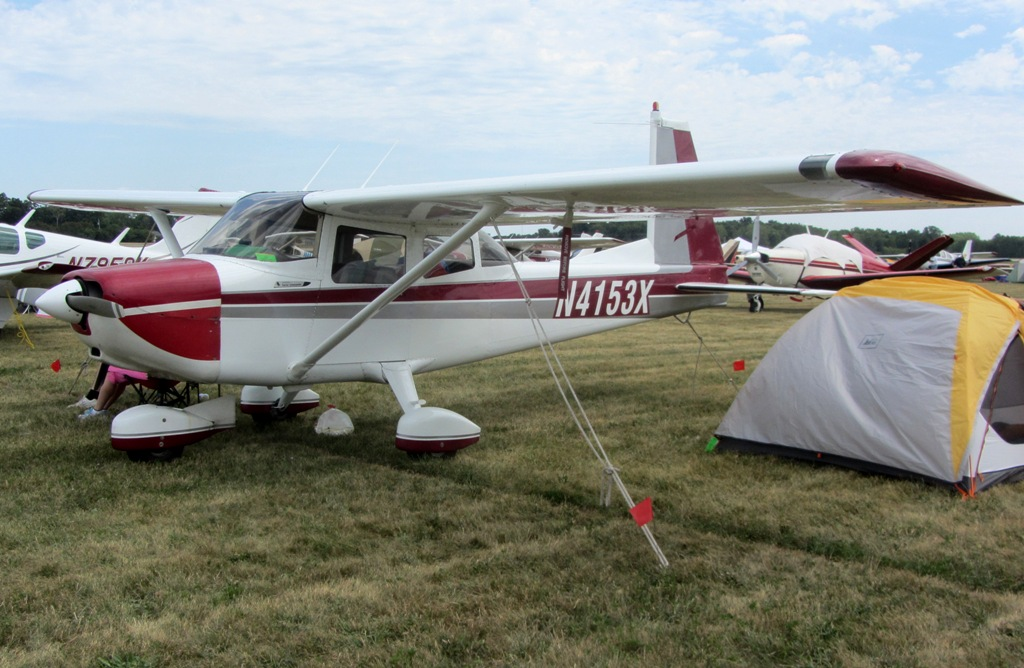
Aero Commander 100-150

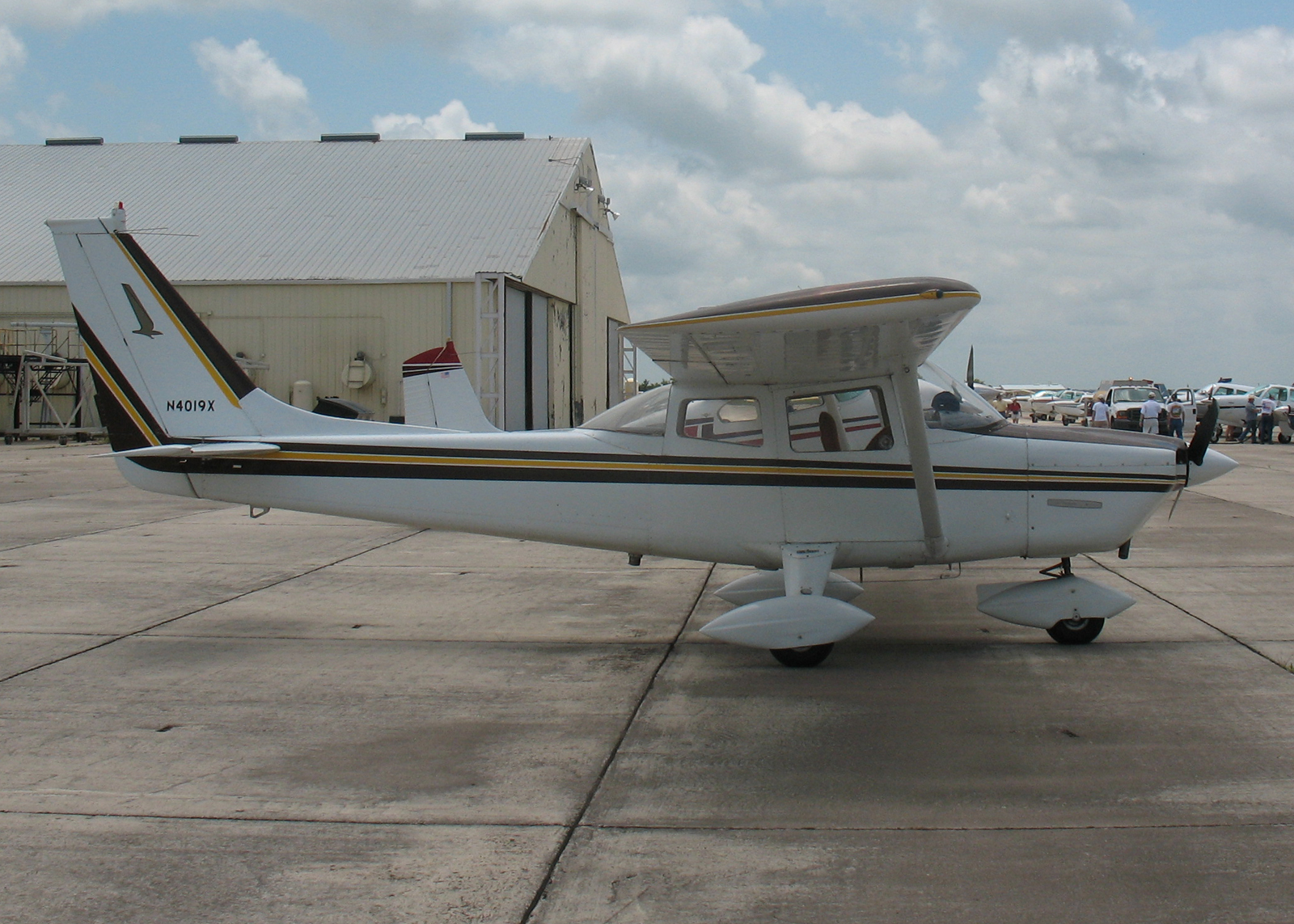
1969 Aero Commander 100-180

- Aero Commander 100 – alias Volaire 1050
  - Aero Commander 100A – alias Volaire 1035
  - Darter Commander – 100 with revised windows and other minor modifications
- Lark Commander 180 – revised aerodynamics, with swept fin and rudder and 180 hp (130 kW) Lycoming O-360-A2F engine. Production from 1968.

== Operators ==
=== Military ===
Indonesia

- Indonesian Navy – Lark Commander 100

== Specifications (Darter Commander) ==
Data from Jane's All The World's Aircraft 1969–70

General characteristics

- Crew: 1
- Capacity: 3 passengers
- Length: 22 ft 6 in (6.86 m)
- Wingspan: 35 ft 0 in (10.67 m)
- Height: 9 ft 4 in (2.84 m)
- Wing area: 181 sq ft (16.8 m^{2})
- Empty weight: 1,280 lb (581 kg)
- Max takeoff weight: 2,250 lb (1,021 kg)
- Fuel capacity: 44 US Gallons (166.5 L)
- Powerplant: 1 × Lycoming O-320-A air-cooled flat-four, 150 hp (110 kW)

Performance

- Maximum speed: 133 mph (214 km/h, 116 kn)
- Cruise speed: 128 mph (206 km/h, 111 kn) at 7,500 ft (2,285 m) (75% power)
- Stall speed: 55 mph (89 km/h, 48 kn) flaps down
- Never exceed speed: 170 mph (270 km/h, 150 kn)
- Range: 510 mi (820 km, 440 nmi)
- Service ceiling: 13,000 ft (4,000 m)
- Rate of climb: 785 ft/min (3.99 m/s)

== See also ==
Aircraft of comparable role, configuration, and era

- Cessna 172
