= Call Aircraft Company =

- Industry: Aerospace
- Founder: Reuel T. Call
- Defunct: 1962
- Successor: Intermountain Manufacturing Company
- Headquarters: Afton, Wyoming, United States
- Number of employees: 10 (1946)

The Call Aircraft Company (CAC or CallAir) was established by Reuel Call in 1939 at Afton, Wyoming, to build a touring aircraft of his own design.

== History ==
The Call Aircraft Company hoped to advance the development of its CallAir Model A to the point of starting production in 1940, but the start of World War II delayed their plans, with the factory operating as an aircraft repair facility for the duration of the conflict. The company was able to continue doing research and development on the Model A, earning a type certificate in July 1944, with the future production model was designated the Model A-2.

CallAir started production of the Model A-2 in late 1945, but first it had to obtain the raw materials. That same year it purchased the inventory of materials from Interstate Aircraft and Engineering as supplies of steel tubing, engines, instruments, fittings, etc had been diverted to those companies with government contracts during the war. Rights to both models of the Interstate Cadet (the S-1A and S-1B) were first transferred to the Harlow Aircraft Company in what Joseph Juptner described in his U.S. Civil Aircraft, Vol 8, as a "deal of some kind" in 1945 and then to CallAir for a reported $5,000 in 1950 ($59,000 in 2024). CallAir built two S-1A Cadets: The first, built in 1951 with the ambitious serial number of 1001, was badged as an Interstate, likely due to the preponderance of built-up Interstate components used in construction; the second was badged a CallAir, serial number 1002, the only Cadet built with their name on it, in 1952.

Production of the Model A commenced after the war with variations developed over time. Sales of the Model A grew with the A-4, which was adapted in 1954 into what Carl Petersen described as the world's first purpose-built agricultural aircraft. This was pure advertising hype as the first purpose built agricultural aircraft was the Huff-Daland Duster designed in 1923-1924, some of which were built for Delta Dusters, later Delta Air Lines The CallAir A-4 evolved into the A-5, the best seller (83 built, including the A-5 Texan) of the Model A-series.

CallAir found itself struggling against fierce competition from Cessna, Piper, and the masses of war-surplus aircraft flooding the market. After 20 years of ownership, founder Reuel Call sold the company in 1959, and the company foundered by the end of the year.

In 1962 the company's assets were purchased by the Intermountain Manufacturing Company (IMCO), headed by Barlow Call, Sr. and Carl Petersen. IMCO, less the Cadet type certificates, was later purchased by Aero Commander in December 1966. However, in 1968 Polaris leased the former factory buildings to build snowmobiles. Following the death of Barlow Call in a mid-air collision while herding horses, the Cadet type certificates were sold separately by the Barlow Call estate to William Diehl as Nikiski Marine Corporation of Anchorage, Alaska in 1969 and Arctic Aircraft Company, Inc in 1970.

== Museum ==
The CallAir Foundation maintains a museum of the company in its hometown.

== Aircraft ==
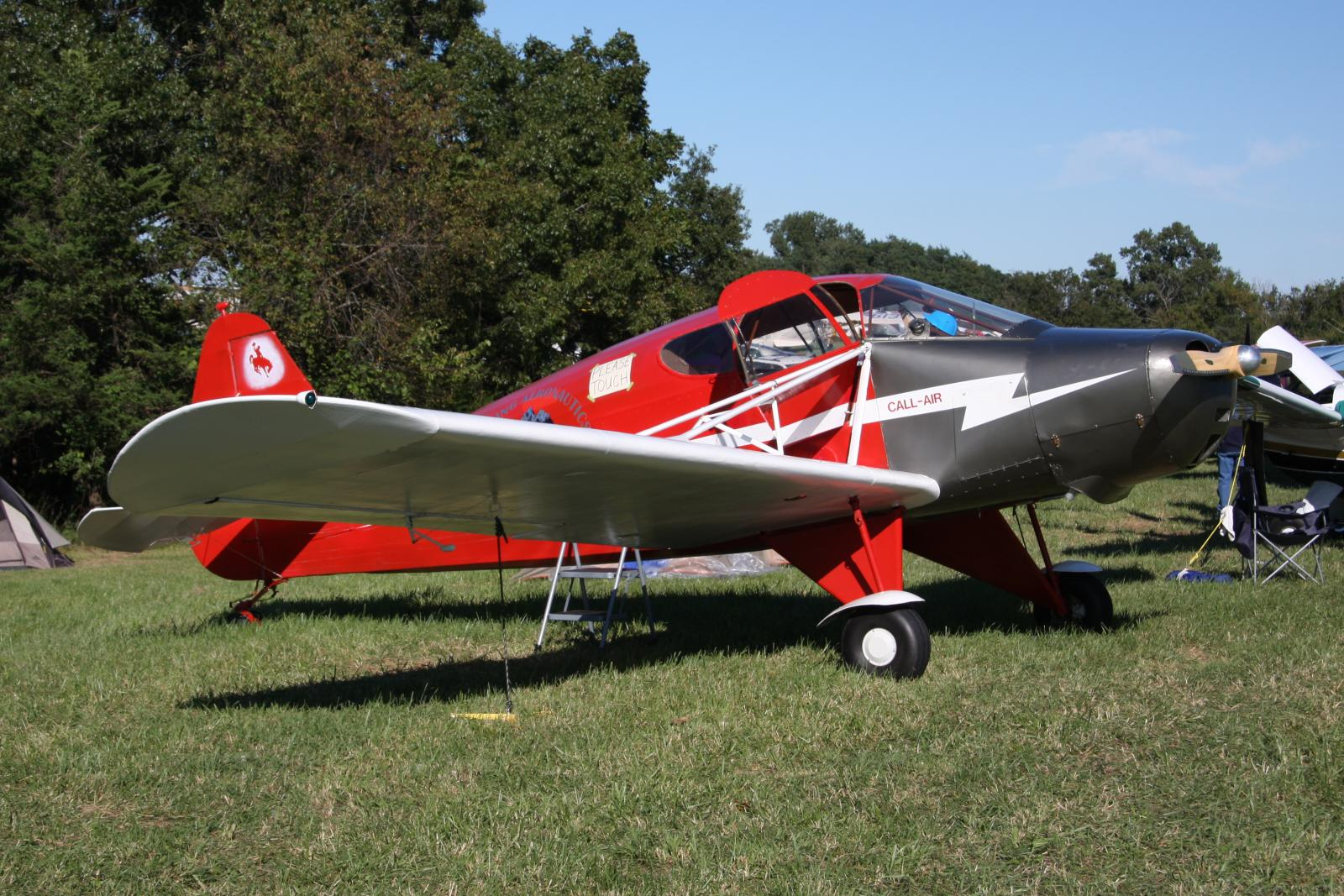
Callair A-2

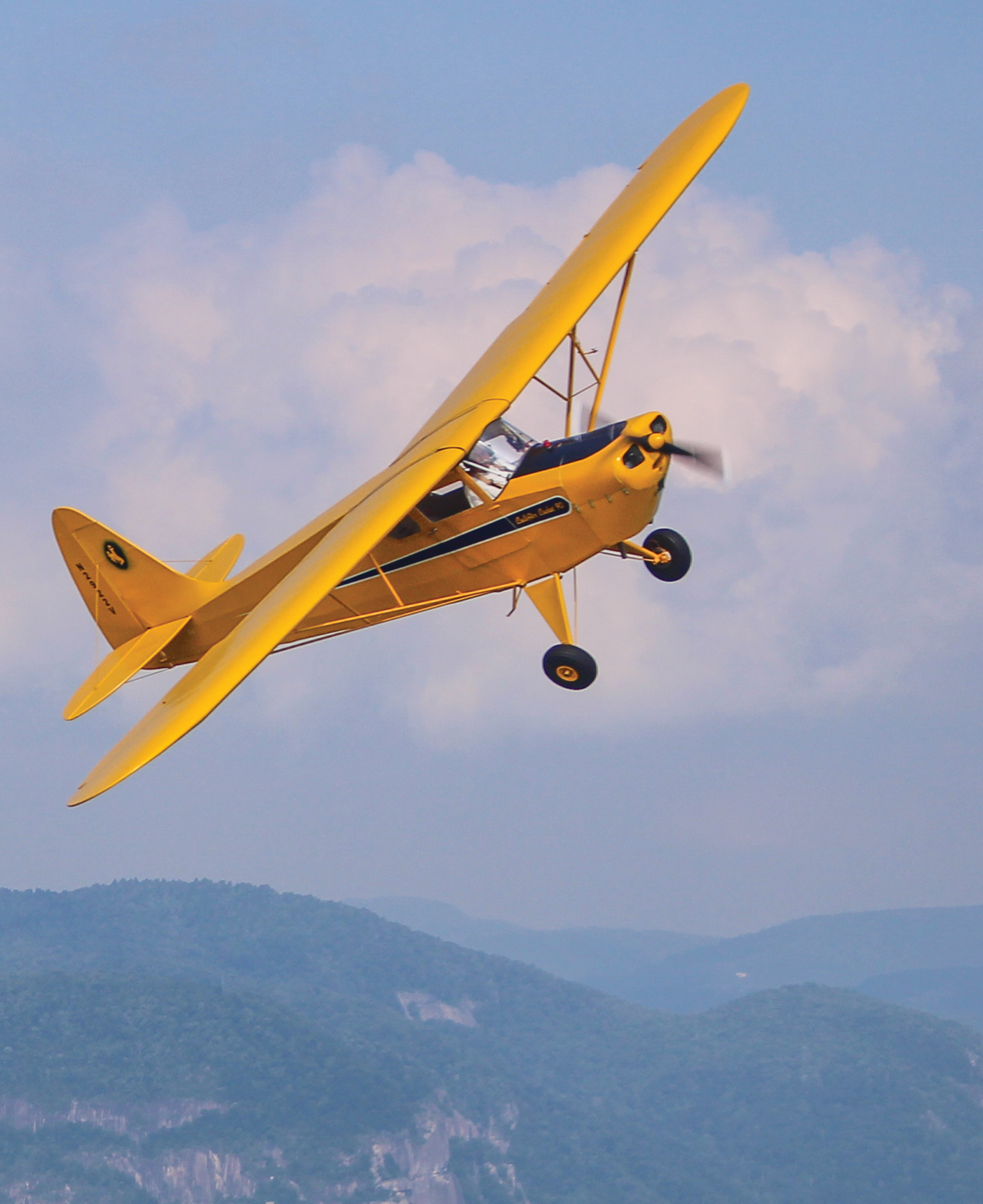
CallAir Cadet sn1002

Model name	First flight	Number built	Type
CallAir S-1		1	Single engine cabin monoplane
CallAir A	1940	1	Single engine cabin monoplane
CallAir A-1		5	Single engine cabin monoplane
CallAir A-2		16	Single engine cabin monoplane
CallAir A-3		15	Single engine cabin monoplane
CallAir A-4		65	Single engine cabin monoplane
CallAir A-5		74	Single engine cabin monoplane
CallAir A-5T Texan		9	Single engine cabin monoplane
CallAir A-6		34	Single engine cabin monoplane
CallAir A-7		1	Single engine cabin monoplane
CallAir A-9	1963		Single engine monoplane agricultural airplane

== See also ==
- Aviat
- Snow Aeronautical
