= CallAir Model A =

American two- to three-seat utility aircraft

Model A
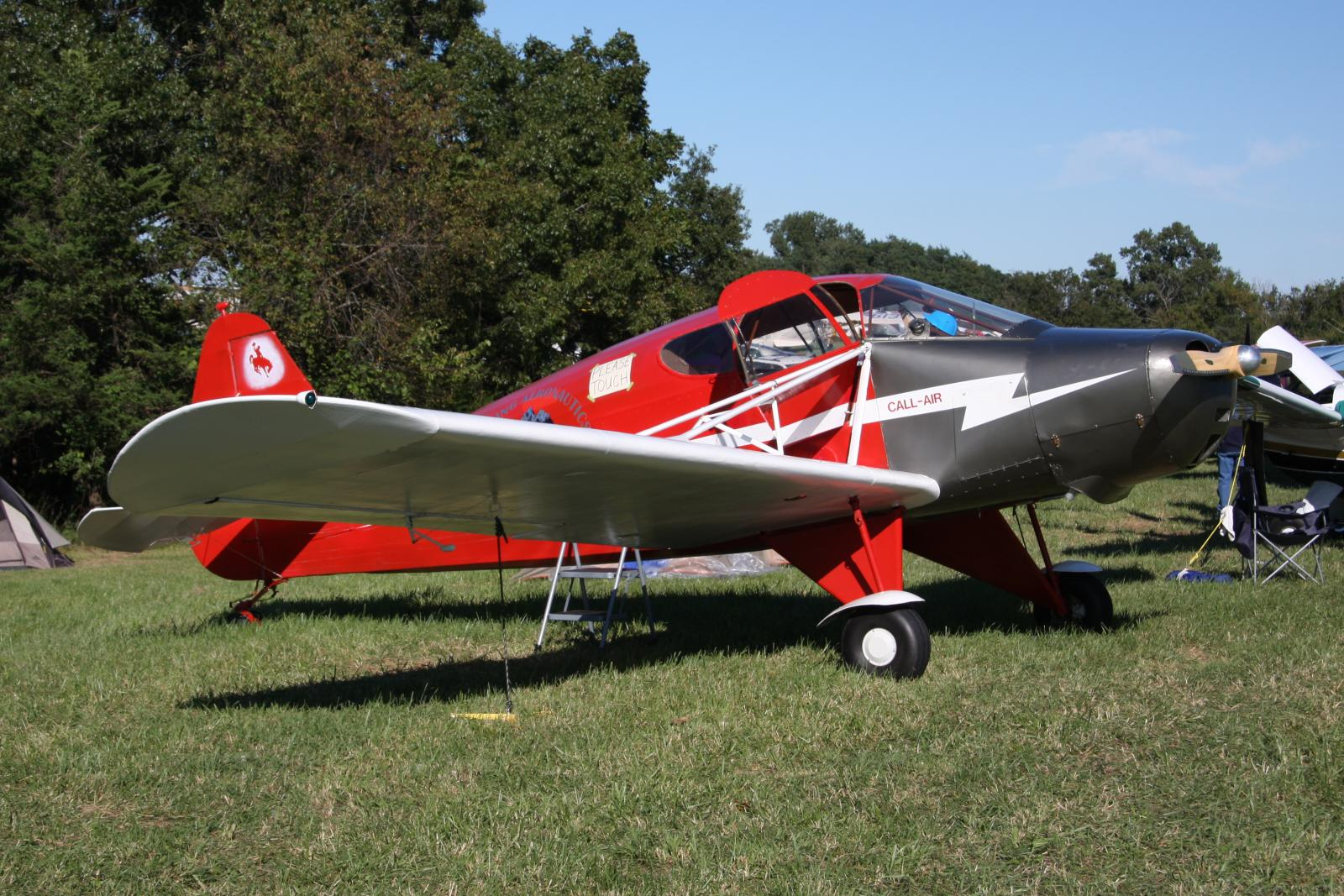
- CallAir A-2

General information
- Type: Cabin monoplane and agricultural aircraft
- Manufacturer: Call Aircraft Company
- Number built: 218

History
- First flight: 1940
- Variant: CallAir A-9

The Call-Air Model A is an American two- to three-seat utility aircraft designed by the Call brothers and built by the Call Aircraft Company, later developed into a successful line of agricultural aircraft.

== Design and development ==
The Model A was designed by the Call family, who were Wyoming ranchers. The aircraft was ready to be produced in 1940 but the start of World War II delayed the start of production to 1946. The family had formed the Call Aircraft Company (known as Call-Air) to produce the aircraft. The prototype Model A was powered by a Continental A-80 engine but was redesignated the Model A-1 when re-engined with an Avco Lycoming O-235-A engine. A United States type certificate was awarded in July 1944 and the production model was designated the Model A-2. The Model A-2 was a two-seat braced low-wing monoplane with fabric-covered wooden wings and fabric-covered welded steel tube. It had a fixed tailwheel landing gear. Further models were introduced with different engines. Examples of the three-seat A-4 were converted for agricultural use followed by a new-build agricultural version the A-5. In 1962 the assets of the company were acquired at auction by the Intermountain Manufacturing Company (IMCO) who developed their own version the IMCO CallAir A-9. IMCO was later taken over by the Aero Commander division of the Rockwell Standard Corporation and later became part of North American Rockwell, the design was further developed and redesignated.

== Variants ==
A

Continental A-80-engined prototype, one built converted to A-1

A-1

Re-engined with an Avco Lycoming O-235-a engine, four built and prototype converted.

A-2

Two-seat cabin monoplane production version powered by an Avco Lycoming O-290-a engine, 16 built.

A-3

125 hp (93 kw) Continental C-125-2-powered version, 15 built.

A-4

Two/three-seat cabin monoplane version powered by a 135 hp (101 kw) Avco Lycoming O-290-D2 engine, 65 built.

A-5

Open-cockpit two-seat agricultural version of the A-4, 74 built.

A-5T Texan

A-5 with revised fuselage structure, nine built.
A-6

Improved version of A-5 with Avco Lycoming O-360-A1A engine, 34 built.

A-7

Similar to A-5 powered by West Coast Dusting-built Continental W-670-240 engine. One converted from an A-6

A-7T

Proposed development of A-7 with higher gross weight

== Specifications (A-2) ==
Data from Jane's all the World's Aircraft 1947

General characteristics

- Crew: 1
- Capacity: 1 pax
- Length: 23 ft 5 in (7.15 m)
- Wingspan: 35 ft 10 in (10.91 m)
- Height: 6 ft 0 in (1.83 m) tailup
- Wing area: 181.6 sq ft (16.87 m^{2})
- Empty weight: 975 lb (442 kg)
- Gross weight: 1,550 lb (703 kg)
- Fuel capacity: 30 US gal (25 imp gal; 110 L)
- Powerplant: 1 × Lycoming O-290B or C 4-cyl. horizontally-opposed air-cooled piston engine, 125 hp (93 kW) at2,600 rpm
- Propellers: 2-bladed Sensenich fixed pitch wooden propeller

Performance

- Maximum speed: 112 mph (180 km/h, 97 kn)
- Cruise speed: 102 mph (164 km/h, 89 kn) *Landing speed: 42 mph (36 kn; 68 km/h)
- Range: 332 mi (534 km, 289 nmi)
- Service ceiling: 17,500 ft (5,300 m)
- Rate of climb: 1,000 ft/min (5.1 m/s)
- Wing loading: 8.53 lb/sq ft (41.6 kg/m^{2})
- Fuel consumption: 0.458 lb/mi (0.129 kg/km)
- Power/mass: 12.4 lb/hp (7.51 kg/kW)
- Take-off run: 142 yd (130 m)
- Landing run: 100 yd (91 m)
