= Snow Aeronautical =

Aircraft manufacturer

- Industry: Aerospace
- Founder: Leland Snow
- Defunct: 1965
- Fate: Merged
- Successor: Aero Commander
- Headquarters: Olney, Texas, United States

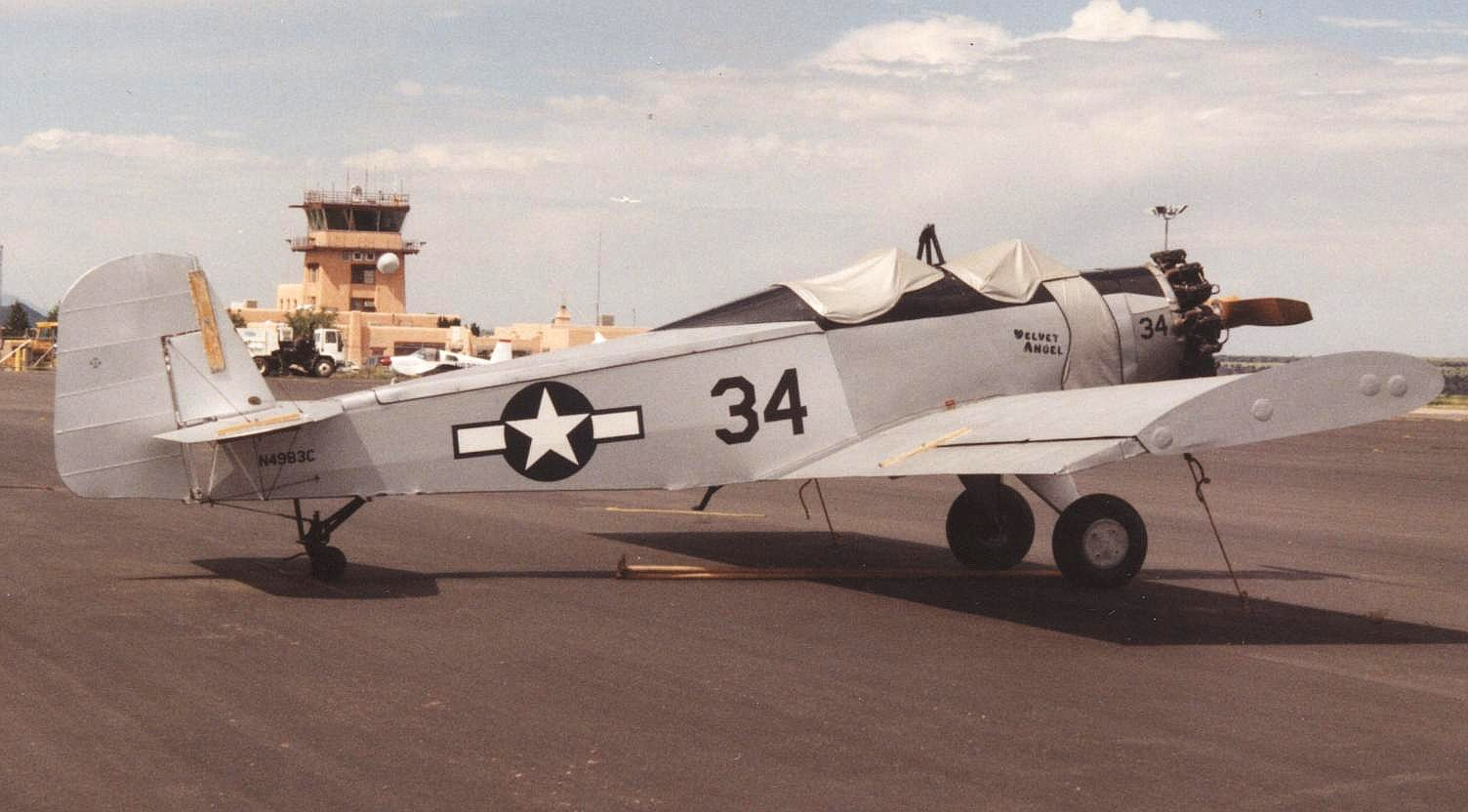
Early Snow S-2A open-cockpit ex-crop sprayer of 1959 at Santa Fe, New Mexico, in 1997

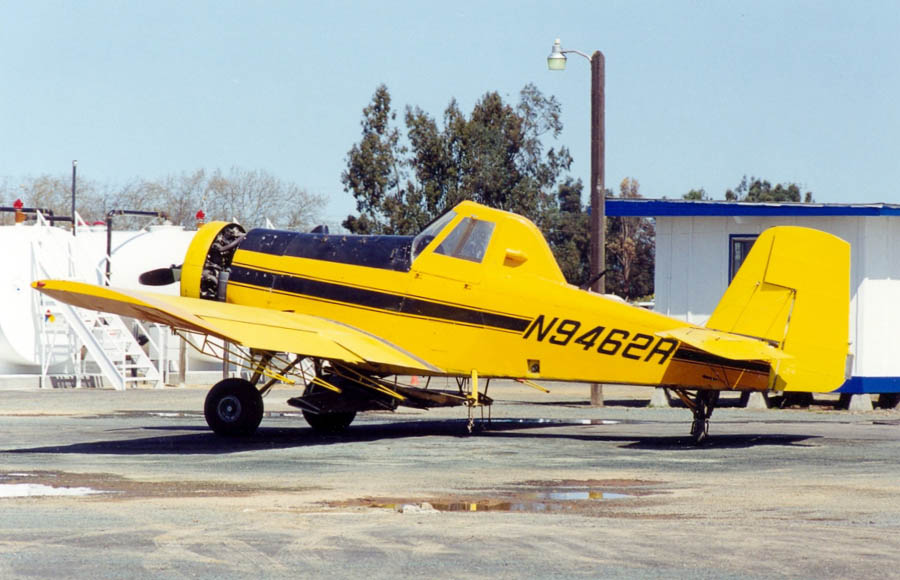
N9462R Snow S-2C-600 built circa 1961, seen here at a later date after being fitted with enclosed cockpit

Snow Aeronautical was an American aircraft manufacturer established in 1956 in Olney, Texas by Leland Snow to manufacture and market agricultural aircraft of his design.

== History ==
Leland Snow, a graduate of the aeronautical engineering program at Texas A&M University, had designed and flown his S-1 in 1953. Originally working at Harlingen, Texas, he moved to Olney, Texas in 1958 where production of the S-2 began.

The British aviation company of Britten-Norman acted as distributors for Snow's aircraft and later took a 17% equity stake in the company. In 1965 Snow Aeronautical was purchased by the Aero Commander division of North American Rockwell, who refined and marketed the S-2 design as the Rockwell S2R Thrush Commander.

== Aircraft ==
Model name	First flight	Number built	Type
Snow S-1	1953	1	Single engine agricultural monoplane
Snow S-2	1956	414	Single engine agricultural monoplane

== See also ==
- Air Tractor
- Ayres Corporation
- Call Aircraft Company
- Thrush Aircraft
