= Thrush Aircraft =

American manufacturer of agricultural aircraft

Thrush Aircraft, LLC
- Company type: Private Company
- Industry: Aerospace
- Predecessor: Ayres Corporation
- Founded: 2003
- Founders: Larry Bays; Payne Hughes
- Headquarters: Albany, Georgia, United States
- Area served: United States/Internationally
- Key people: Mark McDonald (President)
- Website: thrushaircraft.com

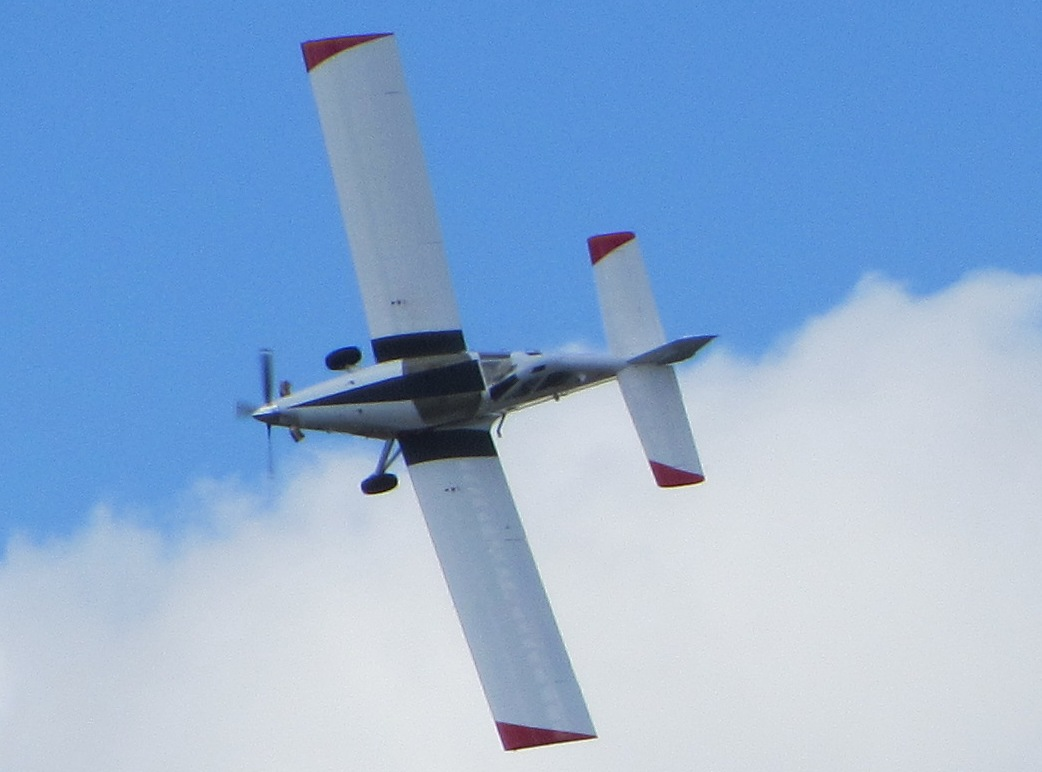
Thrush 510G

Thrush Aircraft, LLC is an American aircraft manufacturer based in Albany, Georgia. It manufactures the Thrush series of agricultural, firefighting and special mission aircraft.

== History ==
Rockwell International originally built the facility in 1965 and operated it until it was purchased by Ayres Corporation on 23 November 1977. In July 2001, Ayres filed for bankruptcy and the rights to the S-2 aircraft were passed to Quality Aerospace. In 2003, the factory was purchased by Larry Bays and Payne Hughes, and one month later Quality Aerospace transferred the type certificates of the S-2 to Thrush Aircraft. In 2005, the company had 150 employees. By 2013, this had increased to 185.

The 510 was introduced in 2009. The first two examples of the 510G Switchback, a variant designed for firefighting were delivered to the Georgia Forestry Commission in 2017.

The company entered bankruptcy protection in September 2019, intending to restructure and emerge in a better financial position. The company laid-off 113 employees as part of the process. As a result of the restructuring, Mark McDonald was named CEO.

== Aircraft ==
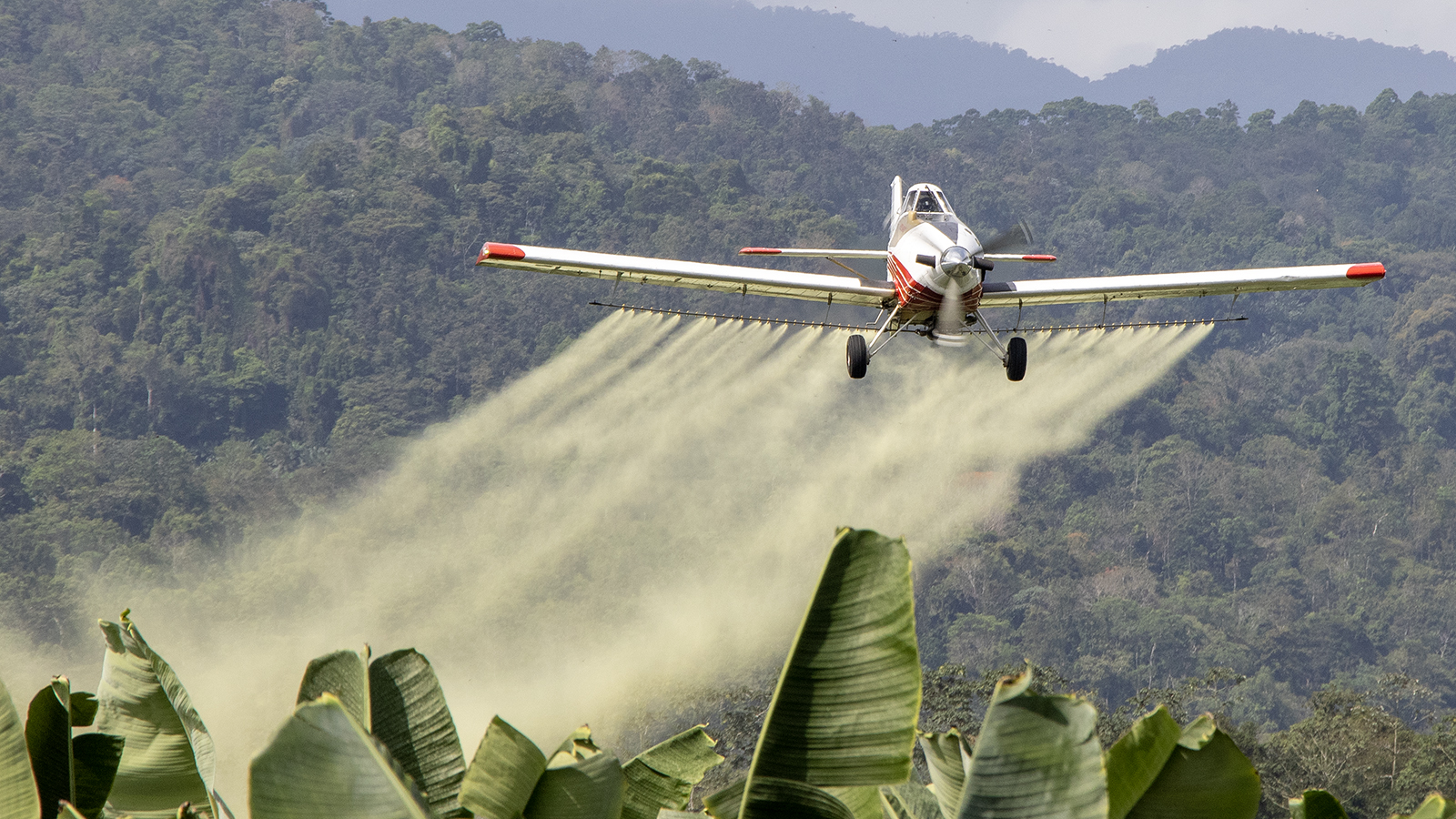
Thrush 510P applying over a banana field

Model name	First flight	Number built	Type
Thrush 510			Single engine agricultural monoplane
Thrush 550			Single engine agricultural monoplane
Thrush 710			Single engine agricultural monoplane

== See also ==
- Snow Aeronautical
