= CallAir A-9 =

American agricultural aircraft

A-9
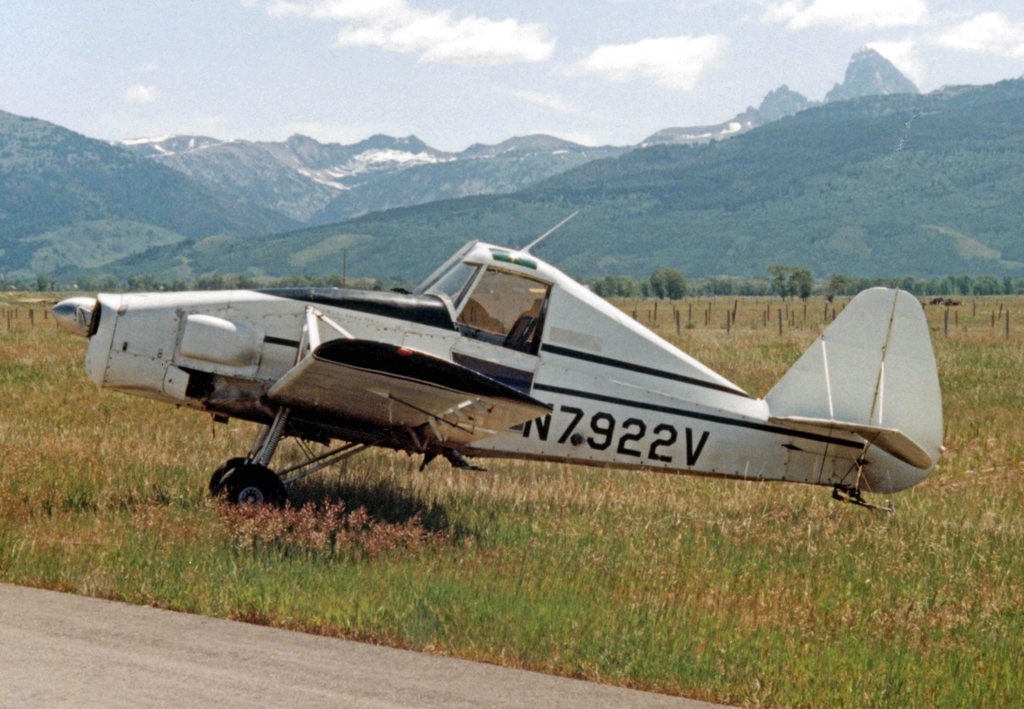
- CallAir A-9B glider tug at Driggs Idaho in June 1994

General information
- Type: Agricultural aircraft
- National origin: United States
- Manufacturer: Intermountain Manufacturing Company, Aero Commander

History
- First flight: 1963
- Developed from: CallAir Model A

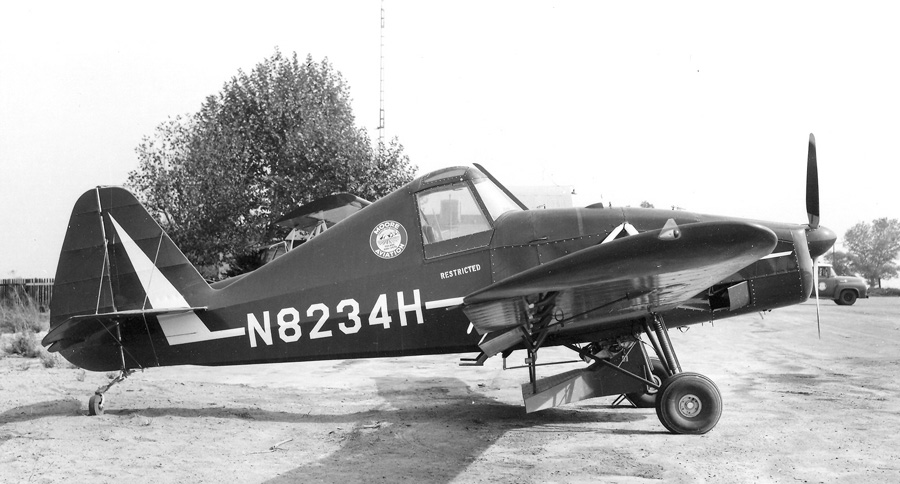
N8234H, an original CallAir A-9 c/n 1211, before they were taken over by IMCO, and later by Rockwell Aero Commander

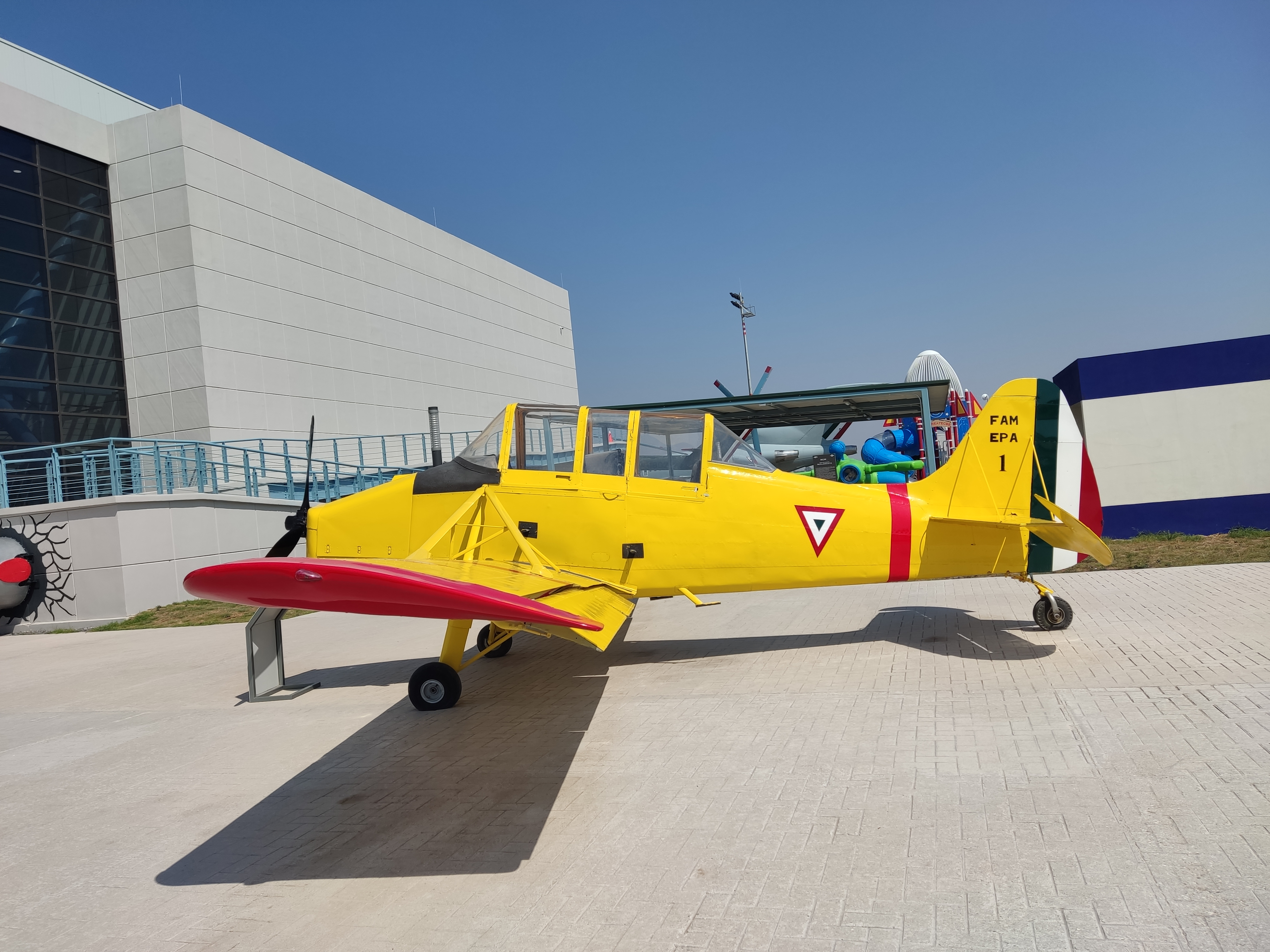
AAMSA A9B-M Quail "Naco" exhibited at Mexican Air Force Museum.

For the USAF unmanned Quail drone aircraft, see ADM-20 Quail.

The IMCO CallAir A-9 is an agricultural aircraft that first flew in 1962, a development of the company's previous successful crop-dusters. It is typical of aircraft of its type - a single-seat aircraft with a low wing incorporating spraying gear.

== Design and development ==
The Call Aircraft Company (CAC) had built the CallAir Model A series of light utility and agricultural aircraft. Following the purchase of CAC in 1962 by Intermountain Manufacturing Company (IMCO) the latter produced a new agricultural derivative of the Callair, the CallAir A-9. Production of the new aircraft started in 1963.

Like the earlier CallAir aircraft, the A-9 is a single-engined monoplane with a braced low wing. It is of mixed construction, with a fabric-covered steel-tube fuselage structure and a wood-and-fabric wing. The pilot sits behind the chemical hopper, and the cockpit is enclosed by two removable, bottom-hinged doors that form the left and right side windows. The aircraft is powered by a single Lycoming O-540 flat-six piston engine. Later, some A-9s have been adapted for glider towing operations.

IMCO was in turn purchased by Rockwell International in 1966, which built the plane under its Aero Commander division before shifting production to Mexico in 1971, under a joint venture there called AAMSA. Production ceased in 1984.

== Variants ==
A-9
Original variant, powered by a 235 hp (175 kW) Lycoming O-540-B2B5. Built by CallAir, IMCO and Aero Commander (as the Sparrow Commander)
A-9B (Super)
Version with 290 hp (216 kW) Lycoming IO-540 or Lycoming TIO-540. Built by Aero Commander (as the Quail Commander).
B-1
Enlarged A-9 with a 400 hp (298 kW) Lycoming IO-720-A1A engine and 42 ft 8 in (13.00 m) wingspan. First flight January 15, 1966. Built by IMCO and Aero Commander (as the Snipe Commander). 36 built.
AAMSA A9B
Licensed production by Aeronautica Agricola Mexicana SA (AAMSA) powered by 300 hp (220 kW) Lycoming IO-540-K1A5 engine and 210 US gal (170 imp gal; 790 L) hopper. 101 built by AAMSA, with a further 17 assembled from Mexican-built components at Laredo, Texas by Aircraft Parts and Development Corporation.
AAMSA A9B-M
Improved version of A9M, with cut down rear fuselage, redesigned cockpit, and increased wing dihedral. 36 built.
A9B-M Quail 'Naco'
Two seat military trainer aircraft built in Mexico by AAMSA, based on A9B-M. Single example (EPA-1) preserved at Museo Militar de Aviación - MUMA, Mexico City.

== Specifications (AAMSA A9B-M Quail) ==
Data from Jane's All The World's Aircraft 1982-83

General characteristics

- Crew: 1
- Capacity: 210 US gal (170 imp gal; 790 L) or 1,600 lb (730 kg) of chemicals
- Length: 24 ft 0 in (7.32 m) (tail up)
- Wingspan: 34 ft 9 in (10.59 m)
- Height: 7 ft 8 in (2.34 m)
- Wing area: 181.9 sq ft (16.90 m^{2})
- Aspect ratio: 6.63:1
- Airfoil: Modified Clark Y
- Empty weight: 1,800 lb (816 kg)
- Max takeoff weight: 3,800 lb (1,724 kg)
- Fuel capacity: 40 US gal (33 imp gal; 150 L)
- Powerplant: 1 × Lycoming IO-540-K1A-5 6-cylinder air-cooled horizontally opposed piston engine, 300 hp (220 kW)

Performance

- Maximum speed: 104 kn (120 mph, 193 km/h)
- Cruise speed: 87 kn (100 mph, 161 km/h)
- Range: 260 nmi (300 mi, 480 km)
- Service ceiling: 16,000 ft (4,900 m)
- Rate of climb: 850 ft/min (4.3 m/s)

== See also ==
Aircraft of comparable role, configuration, and era

- Aero Boero 260AG
- Cessna 188
- Embraer EMB 202 Ipanema
- Piper PA-25 Pawnee
