= Fremont Motors Corporation =

Fremont Motors
- Type: Private
- Industry: Automobile
- Founded: 1938 in Lander, Wyoming, United States
- Founder: Clyde Guschewsky
- Headquarters: Lander, Wyoming, United States
- Number of locations: 14 (2013)
- Area served: Lander, Wyoming, Riverton, Wyoming, Cody, Wyoming, Powell, Wyoming, Sheridan, Wyoming, Casper, Wyoming, Rock Springs, Wyoming, Scottsbluff, Nebraska, Wyoming, Nebraska, United States
- Key people: Arin Emmert CEO
- Products: Ford, Lincoln, Chrysler, Dodge, Jeep, Ram, Fiat, Chevrolet, Buick, GMC, Toyota, Volkswagen, Pre-Owned Vehicles
- Services: Auto maintenance, sales, leasing
- Owner: Cathy Guschewsky
- Number of employees: 450-500
- Website: www.fremontmotors.com

Fremont Motors is a privately owned new and used automotive retailer in the United States. It was founded in April, 1938 in Lander, Wyoming. The company owns and operates 14 dealerships in Wyoming and Nebraska. The current president of Fremont Motor Companies is Cathy Guscheusky, and the CEO is her daughter Arin Emmert.

== History ==
The original Fremont Motor Company dealership started in 1938 in Lander, Wyoming, selling Ford Model Ts, deluxe sedans, and trucks. In 1938, Arin Emmert's great grandfather started Fremont Motors in Lander, Wyoming. Her father, Chuck (Chuck) Guschewsky was appointed the president of the company in 1989. As of 2013, Fremont Motors has fourteen dealerships and employs between 400 and 425 full-time "associates".

== List of dealerships ==
=== Lander ===
- Ford
- Ram
- Chrysler
- Dodge
- Jeep
- Toyota

=== Cody ===
- Ford
- Ram
- Chrysler
- Lincoln
- Jeep
- Dodge

=== Sheridan ===
- Ford
- Lincoln
- Toyota

=== Powell ===
- Ford
- Lincoln
- Chrysler
- Dodge
- Jeep
- Ram

=== Rock Springs ===
- Ram
- Chrysler
- Dodge
- Jeep
- Fiat

=== Riverton ===
- Ford
- Lincoln
- Chevrolet
- GMC
- Buick

=== Casper ===
- Ram
- Chrysler
- Volkswagen
- Dodge
- Fiat
- Jeep

=== Scottsbluff ===
- Ford
- Lincoln
