= Ayres Corporation =

American aircraft manufacturer

- Industry: Aerospace
- Predecessor: Albany, Georgia, division of Rockwell International
- Founded: 1977
- Founder: Fred Ayres
- Defunct: 2001
- Fate: Bankruptcy; acquired by Thrush Aircraft
- Successor: Thrush Aircraft
- Headquarters: Albany, Georgia, United States
- Subsidiaries: LET (1998–2001)

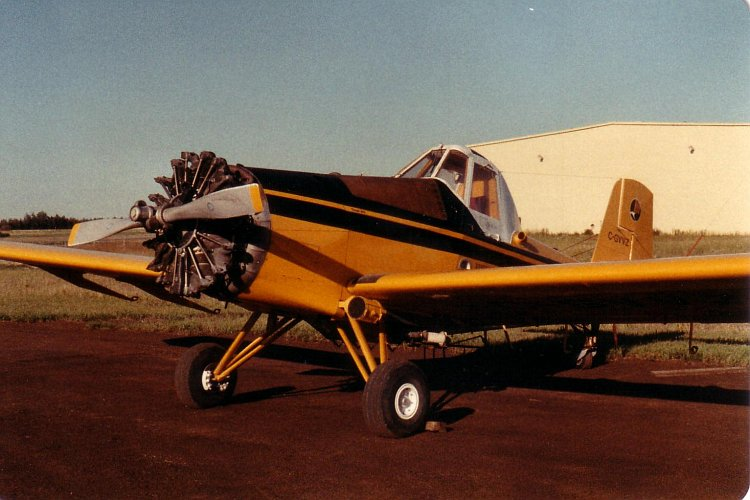
An Ayres S-2R Thrush

Ayres Corporation was an American aircraft manufacturer owned and run by Fred Ayres.

== History ==
In 1977, Ayres bought the Albany, Georgia division of Rockwell International, which made the S2R Thrush Commander agricultural aircraft. Before this, Ayres had been a distributor of Thrush Commanders. After the acquisition, Ayres developed two-seat and turboprop-powered versions of the Thrush Commander.

By 1981, the company was operating a crop-dusting training school. A special V-1-A Vigilante version of the Thrush Commander was developed in 1989 for anti-drug operations in South America. The company attempted to sell 10 Turbo Thrush aircraft to Iran in 1993, but was unable to receive an exemption from U.S. government sanctions.

In 1996, urged on by Federal Express, development was begun on the Ayres LM200 Loadmaster, designed to carry 7,500 pounds of cargo. The aircraft was to be powered by two 1350 hp LHTEC TP800 driving a single five-bladed Hamilton-Standard propeller through a combining gearbox. To support this development effort, Ayres acquired the LET aircraft manufacturing company in the Czech Republic in September 1998.

In 2001, the company was forced into bankruptcy when creditors foreclosed on it and the Loadmaster program was terminated.

In 2003, the company's assets were bought by Thrush Aircraft.

== Aircraft ==
Model name	First flight	Number built	Type
Ayres Thrush			Single engine agricultural monoplane
Ayres LM200 Loadmaster	N/A	0	Unbuilt single engine cargo monoplane

== See also ==
- Snow Aeronautical
