= Aero Commander =

Aircraft manufacturer (1944–1986)

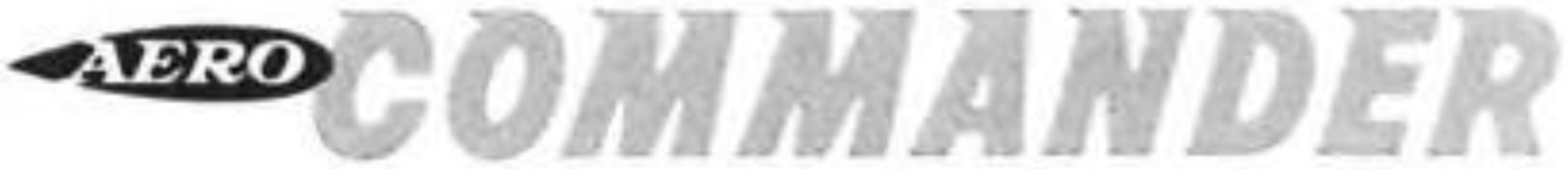

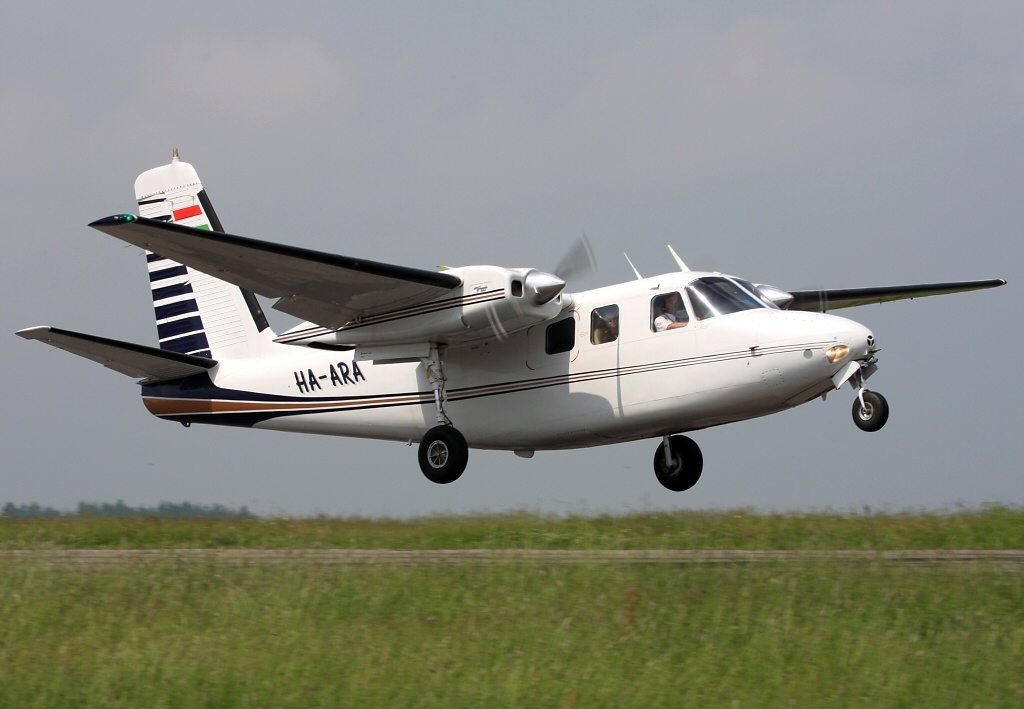
- Aero Commander 500A Commander taking off from an airport in the Czech Republic.
- Formerly: Aero Design and Engineering Company
- Industry: Aerospace
- Founded: 1944
- Founder: Rufus Travis Amis; Ted Smith
- Defunct: 1986
- Parent: Rockwell-Standard (1958–1981); Gulfstream Aerospace (1981–1986)

Aero Commander was an aircraft manufacturer formed in 1944. In subsequent years, it became a subsidiary of Rockwell International and Gulfstream Aerospace. The company ceased aircraft production in 1986.

== History ==
Aero was formed in Culver City, California, in 1944 to design and manufacture a light twin-engined transport aircraft. Ted Smith, a former project engineer at Douglas Aircraft Company, assembled a team of 14 engineers to design what would be the Aero Commander. Preliminary design was completed in 1946. The first prototype took flight on April 23, 1948, and was certified by the Civil Aeronautics Administration (CAA) in June, 1950. Three men funded the company's early efforts: Philadelphia attorney George Pew and Oklahoma City brothers William and Rufus Travis Amis.

In September 1950, it became the Aero Design and Engineering Company of Oklahoma. Its facilities consisted of an aircraft hangar and 26,000 sq ft (2,400 m^{2}) manufacturing facility located at what is now Wiley Post Airport near Oklahoma City. In August 1951, the first production Aero Commander, the piston-engined model 520, rolled off the assembly line. It was designed as a business class twin-engine aircraft for corporate travelers.

In 1954, the 520 was replaced by the 560 and 560A featuring a larger cabin and more powerful Lycoming piston engines. In 1955, the U.S. Air Force selected the Aero Commander as the personal transport for President Dwight D. Eisenhower, ordering 15 aircraft, two of which were used by The White House. This aircraft was a military version of the Aero Commander and was assigned a liaison function. It was used by Eisenhower to travel from Washington, D.C. to his farm at Gettysburg, Pennsylvania. In 1958, the Company introduced the first pressurized business aircraft in the form of the model 720 Alti-Cruiser.

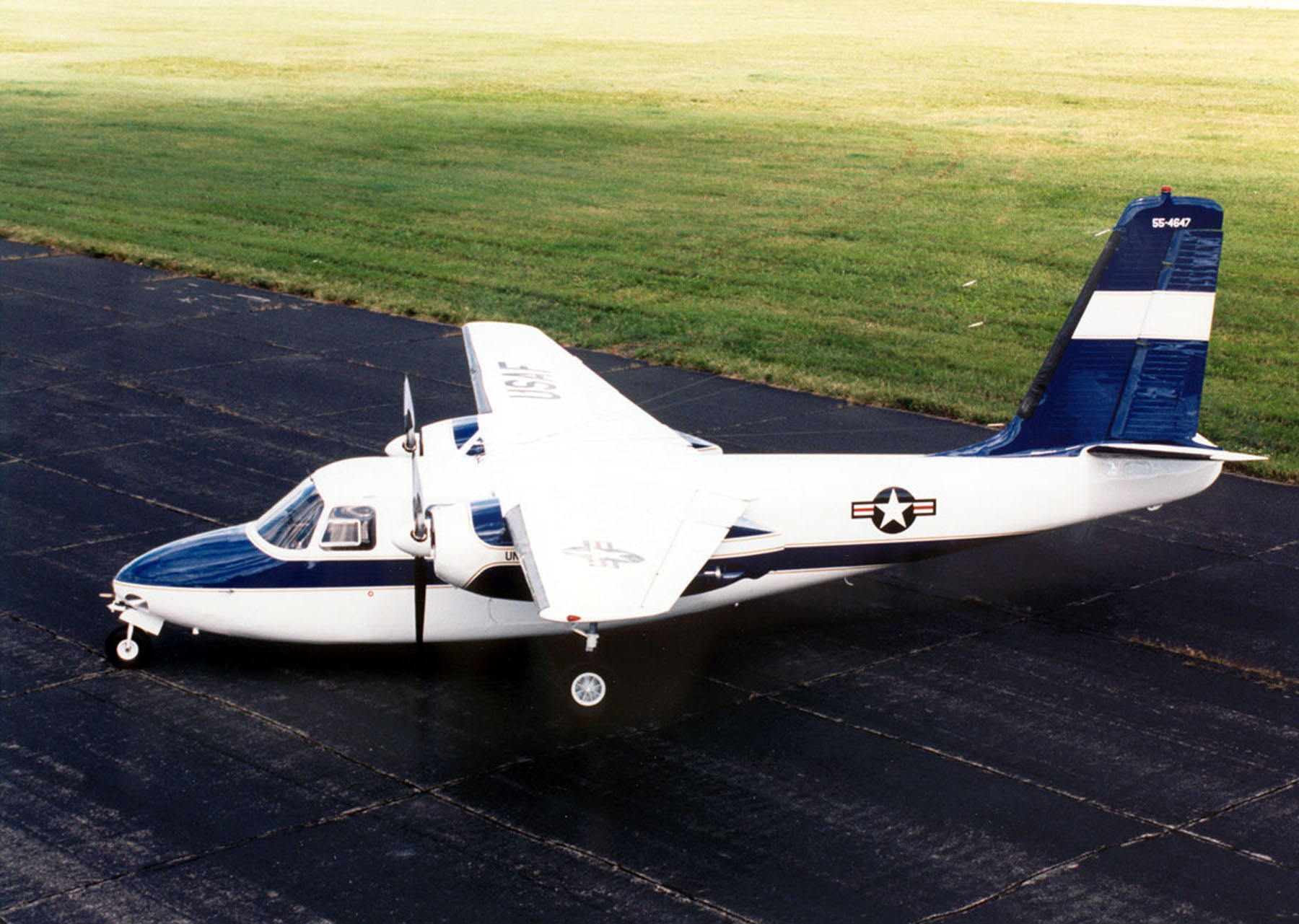
United States Air Force Aero Commander U-4B.

The company was acquired by Rockwell-Standard in 1958 and changed its name to Aero Commander Inc. in late 1960. The aircraft added fuel injection engines and other modifications to increase performance, resulting in the 1960 introduction of the Twin Commander. With the advent of the small gas turbine engine, the 680 T model was released in 1964, followed by the 690 series in 1971, and the JetProp series in 1979.

The company later incorporated other aircraft types developed at smaller companies and marketed them as components of the Aero Commander line. It also developed a business-twinjet, the 1121 Jet Commander. The production of this aircraft was delayed with the company finally delivering to its first customer, Timken Roller Bearing Corporation, on January 11, 1965. Aero Commander sold the manufacturing rights to Israel Aircraft Industries (IAI), who produced it as the Westwind.

In February 1981, Rockwell International sold the Aero Commander division to Gulfstream Aerospace. The final Twin Commander model 1000, released in the early 1980s, was powered by Dash 10 engines. In December 1985, Gulfstream Aerospace was acquired by Chrysler Corp. With a new focus on the business jet market, production of the Twin Commander ended in 1986.

In 1989, the Twin Commander Aircraft subsidiary of Gulfstream was acquired by Precision Aerospace Corporation. With this acquisition, the company transformed from an aircraft manufacturer to an OEM parts, service, and support provider. In 2003, the company was reincorporated as Twin Commander Aircraft, LLC. In 2005, the company was acquired from Precision in a management buyout.

== Aircraft ==
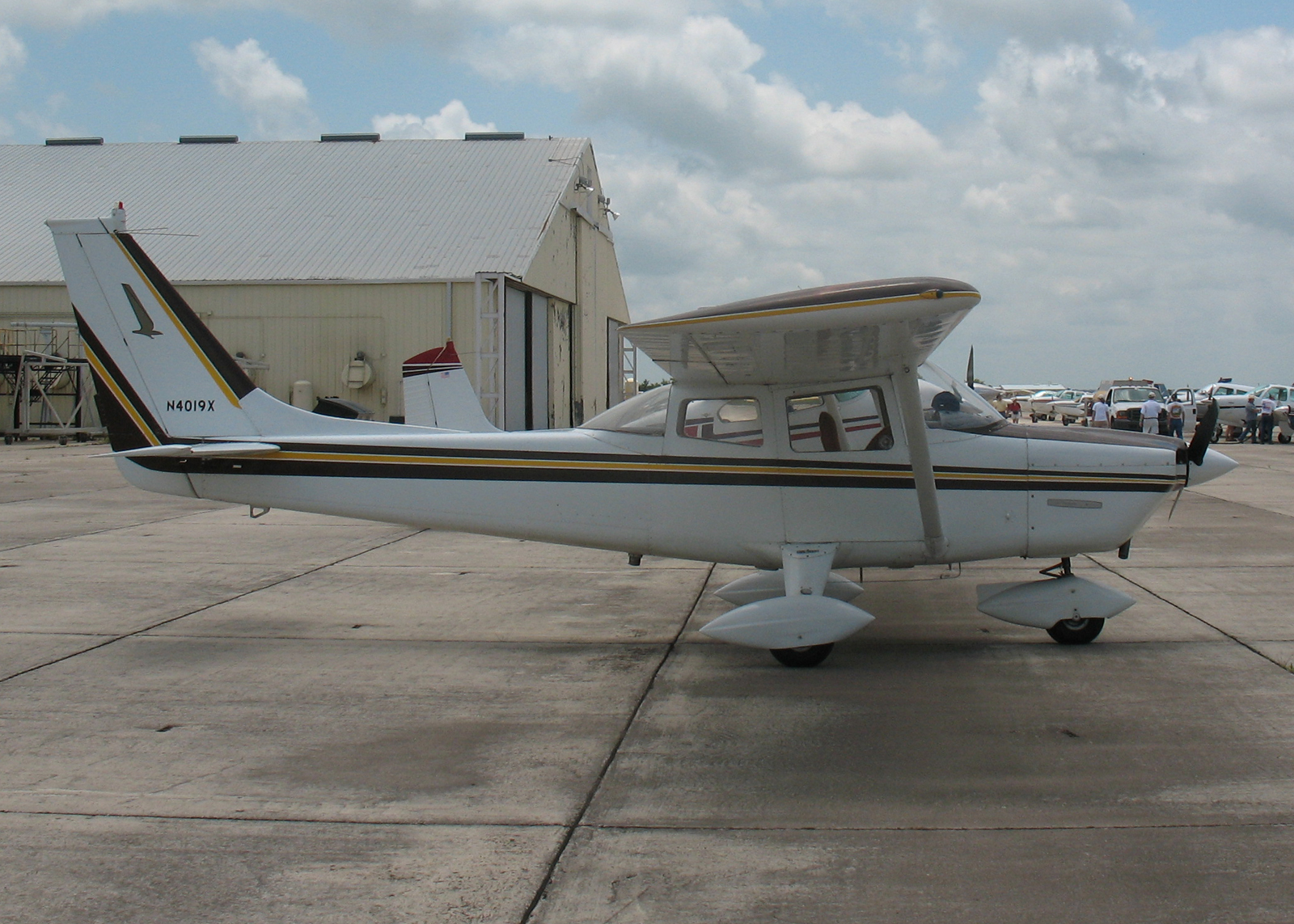
Aero Commander 100

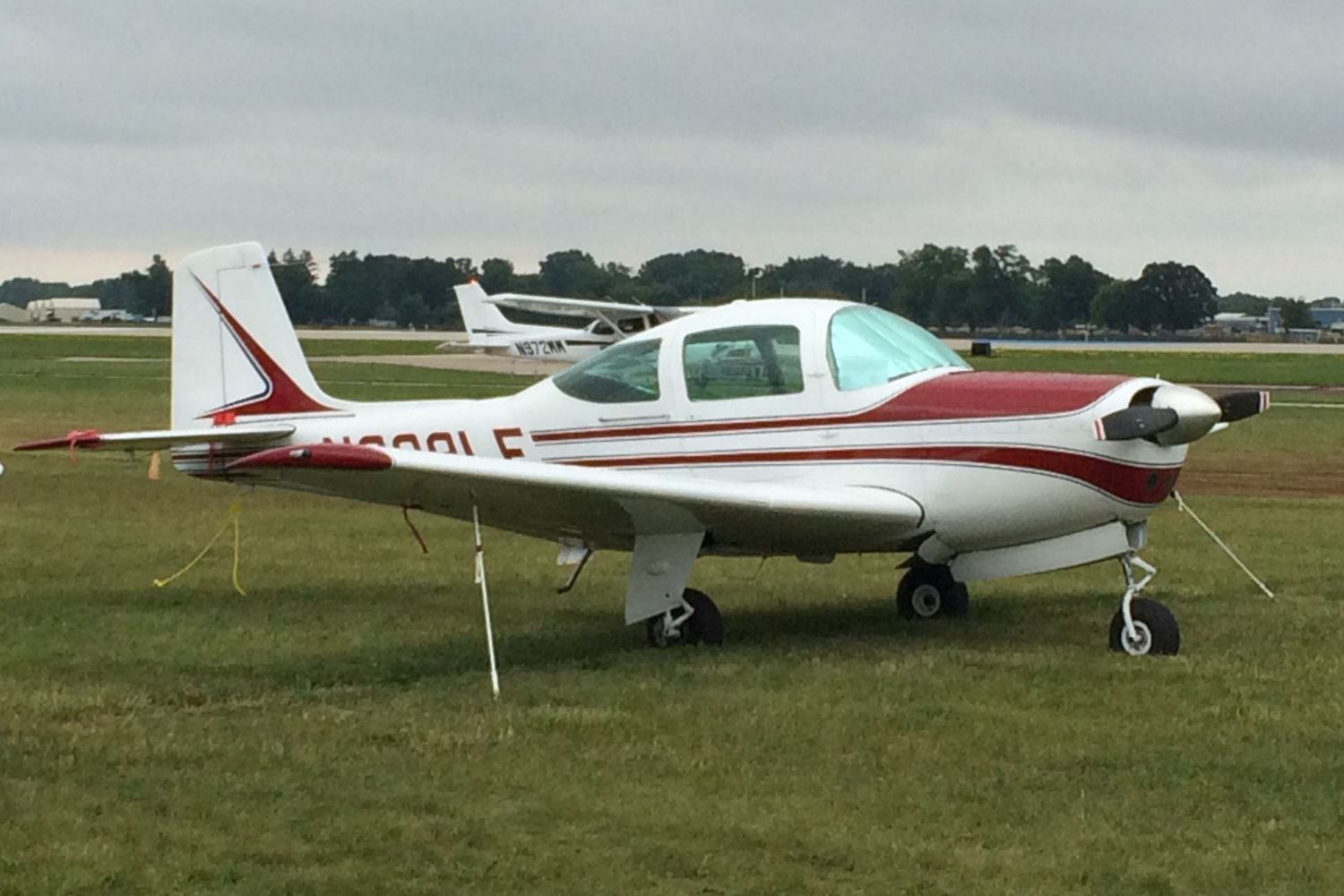
Aero Commander 200

Model name	First flight	Number built	Type
Aero Commander 100		548	Single engine cabin monoplane
Aero Commander 200		76	Single engine cabin monoplane
Aero Commander 500	1948		Twin engine utility monoplane
Aero Commander 1121 Jet Commander	1963	150	Twin engine business monoplane
Ag Commander A-9			Single engine agricultural monoplane
Ag Commander S-2 Thrush			Single engine agricultural monoplane

Ag Commander was a brand name used by Aero Commander for their line of agricultural aircraft. Two unrelated aircraft were marketed under this name: the CallAir A-9, sold as the Ag Commander A-9 and B-9, and the Ayres Thrush (a.k.a. the Snow S-2), sold as the Ag Commander S-2. Both aircraft were originally the products of smaller manufacturers that Aero Commander had purchased. The Ag Commander brand was dropped in 1970, but production continued as the Rockwell S2R Thrush Commander.

== See also ==
- Ayres Corporation
- Intermountain Manufacturing Company
- Meyers Aircraft Company
- Snow Aeronautical
- Volaircraft
