= Tom Balding Bits & Spurs =

- Founded: 1984
- Headquarters: Sheridan, Wyoming, United States
- Products: Metalwork
- Website: Official website

Tom Balding Bits & Spurs is a small metalwork manufacturer in Sheridan, Wyoming that designs and sells handmade equine riding equipment. Their products, most notably bits and spurs, are used by professional horsepeople and trainers.

== History ==
In the 1960s, Tom Balding began working with metal as a teenager in Ontario, California, building such things as custom hot rod parts and aluminum backpack frames. In 1974, he opened his first welding and fabrication shop specializing in a precise type of welding called TIG welding.

He continued to TIG weld in the aerospace and sailing industry until he moved to Sheridan, Wyoming in the late 1970s. In Wyoming, he worked as a ranch hand until 1984, when a neighbor asked him to repair a broken bit. He built her a new one, and for the next 15 years, he ran Tom Balding Bits & Spurs out of a repurposed mobile home.

After that, the business expanded due to increased popularity from the endorsement of multiple National Reined Cow Horse Association (NRCHA) Snaffle Bit Champions such as Bobby Ingersoll. The business is now widely recognized throughout the world of western horsemanship.

== Metalwork Products ==
The company handcrafts metalwork products and other items in Sheridan, Wyoming. All custom pieces are made at the fabrication shop where they are precision cut into parts and fitted together, instead of being cast. Each part of every product is made to 1/1000 of an inch accuracy.

Their products include spurs, custom spurs, heel bands, shanks, and rowels. They also handcraft bits made for shank bits, snaffle bits, baseline bits, bit shanks, and mouthpieces for Western and English markets.

The company also sells other items such as jewelry and belt buckles, including a variety of silver and turquoise jewelry; money clips, leather belts, and photo albums.

Tom Balding Bits & Spurs products are known for their design and craftsmanship and have been featured in galleries and in museums. The company has also been featured on Discovery Channel’s How It’s Made.
