= Roberts Aircraft =

Airline of the United States

Roberts Aircraft Company was founded in 1939 as a proprietorship by W. Lynn and Jean S. Roberts. In the early years the company was involved in fixed wing operations and was formally incorporated in Nevada in 1953. Lynn Roberts had a long and varied flight career that spanned five decades throughout the United States and adjoining countries. From 1939 to 1966, the company was involved in a number of fixed-base operations serving both the fixed wing and rotor wing communities.

Subsequent to 1966, a new corporation, Roberts Aircraft Inc. was formed in Arizona. The roles of the company were specialized during the 1970s. Roberts Aircraft Company owned assets while Roberts Aircraft Inc. became the visible operating entity. Roberts Aircraft Inc. successfully conducted operations for various mineral, mining and forestry activities. The late 1970s saw the beginning of the decline in base metal prices, uranium and finally oil prices declined. Interest rates were historically high and the helicopter industry in the west was in a period of decline. This forced a change in the business and Roberts Aircraft Inc. went dormant.

Two years before Lynn Roberts’ death in 1981, the companies were equally divided between the sons, Ken and Jim. Ken took over the role as president and Jim as vice president. They faced managing a helicopter operating company in a very recessed market without the aid of their father. Given the region's oversupply of rotary wing providers and shrinking customer base, change was required to remain successful. In 1981, Heli Support was formed as a subsidiary of Roberts Aircraft Company and Roberts Aircraft Inc. was phased out. This change was completed by the end of 1983. The strategy proved successful.

Today Roberts Aircraft Company has aircraft leased to operations in a variety of countries and several continents. The aircraft act in roles as varied as part-public, EMS, military, agriculture, and tourism.

Heli Support Inc. currently provides helicopter maintenance, which includes component and engine overhaul and repair to Eurocopter operators throughout the world. Other than being authorized to service and overhaul the Eurocopter product line they are the only independent operation allowed to overhaul the Turbomeca Arriel 1 series engine in the United States.

Roberts Aircraft Inc. has been recreated as Trans Aero Ltd. and the charter business in back in operation.

== See also ==
- List of defunct airlines of the United States
