= Intermountain Manufacturing Company =

- Predecessor: Call Aircraft Company
- Founded: 1962
- Parent: Aero Commander,

The Intermountain Manufacturing Company (IMCO) was a US aircraft manufacturer of the 1960s based in Afton, Wyoming that produced agricultural aircraft.

IMCO was formed in 1962 to purchase the assets of the failed Call Aircraft Company, and the following year commenced new production of the CallAir A-9. IMCO also developed an enlarged and refined version of the aircraft, designated the B-1.

Aero Commander, a division of Rockwell International purchased IMCO in 1966 and relocated production to Albany, Georgia the following year.
