= Mesa Natural Gas Solutions =

Company that specializes in power solutions; based in Loveland, Colorado

Mesa Natural Gas Solutions, LLC.
- Type: Limited liability company
- Industry: Power Generation
- Founded: 2014
- Headquarters: [Loveland, Colorado], United States
- Website: Official website

Mesa Natural Gas Solutions is a company based in Casper, Wyoming. Mesa specializes in natural gas or liquid propane powered mobile generators. Most Mesa Generators are currently used in oil and gas applications, including as Flare Gas Recovery Systems (FGRS).

== Current operations ==
Mesa Natural Gas Solutions' (Mesa Power Solutions) natural gas generators currently provide power across North America and some international basins.

Locations include:
Loveland, Colorado
Casper, Wyoming
Cheyenne, Wyoming
Killdeer, North Dakota
Williston, North Dakota
Stillwater, Oklahoma
Oklahoma City, Oklahoma
Carlsbad, New Mexico
Farmington, New Mexico
Hobbs, New Mexico
Fort Stockton, Texas
Midland, Texas
Bryan, Texas
Pecos, Texas
Dilley, Texas
Center, Texas
San Antonio, Texas
La Vernia, Texas
Pleasanton, Texas
Vernal, Utah and
Houtzdale, Pennsylvania

== Veteran, Reserve & National Guard Workforce ==
Mesa's current CEO, Scott Gromer, spent 23 years in the Army and retired as a Major from the Wyoming Army National Guard. Additionally, over 60% of the company’s founders and leadership are veterans of the United States military and continue to serve in the Reserves and National Guard.

The company's first CEO, Jakob Norman, is a veteran of the United States Air Force, United States Army, and Wyoming National Guard where he obtained the rank of Colonel and currently serves as a Regimental Commander. Jakob Norman was the CEO from the inception of the company through October 2016.

The company received the prestigious Secretary of Defense Freedom Award in 2017 for Mesa’s efforts in 2014, 2015, and 2016 in support of the Guard and Reserves (the award was for the period of October 1, 2015 through September 30, 2016). The Secretary of Defense Employer Support Freedom Award is the highest recognition given by the U.S. Government to employers for their support of their employees who serve in the Guard and Reserve.

Mesa Power Solutions also received the Extraordinary Employer Support Award in 2022, which is a follow-on award given to a company that has demonstrated sustained support for five years after receiving the Department of Defense Freedom Award.
