= Volaircraft =

Volaircraft Inc
- Industry: Aerospace
- Founded: 1958; 68 years ago in Aliquippa, Pennsylvania, United States
- Founder: Jack Gilberti
- Defunct: 1965
- Fate: Acquired by North American Rockwell
- Products: Volaire

Volaircraft Inc was a US aircraft manufacturer established in Aliquippa, Pennsylvania in 1958 by Jack Gilberti to produce a light utility aircraft, known as the Volaire. The firm and the rights to its aircraft were purchased by North American Rockwell in 1965, operating as the Aliquppa Division of Aero Commander, itself a division of Rockwell Standard.
