= List of aircraft (Tn) =

This is a list of aircraft in alphabetical order beginning with 'Tn'.

== Tn ==
=== TNCA ===
(Talleres Nacionales de Construcciones Aeronáuticas - national aviation workshops) see also Azcárate

- TNCA 1-E
- TNCA 2-E-98 Sonora
- TNCA 3-E-130 Tololoche
- TNCA 4-E-131 Quetzalcoatl
- TNCA 5-E-132 Parasol - Angel Lascurain
- TNCA 6-E-133
- TNCA 6-E-136??
- TNCA 6-E-133
- TNCA 7-E-134
- TNCA 8-E-135
- TNCA Avro Anáhuac
- TNCA Serie A - biplane.
- TNCA Serie B
- TNCA Series C
- TNCA Serie D - derived from Bleriot and Morane-Saulnier aircraft.
- TNCA Serie E - biplane.
- TNCA Serie F - derived from Bleriot and Morane-Saulnier aircraft.
- TNCA Serie G - derived from Bleriot and Morane-Saulnier aircraft.
- TNCA Serie H - bomber, monoplane, high wing, dual control.
- TNCA Azcárate E
- TNCA Azcárate O-E-1
- TNCA Balbuena 20 de noviembre
- TNCA Barreda
- TNCA Corsario Azcárate
- TNCA MTW-1
- TNCA Sea 2 - (Antonio Sea)
- TNCA Sea-4 - (Antonio Sea)
- TNCA Sonora
- TNCA Toloche - (Angel Lascurain)
- TNCA TTS-5
- TNCA ETP-1 Teziutlan (Antonio Zea)
- TNCA Latino America (Juan Guillermo Villasana)
- TNCA Brown Special (Lawrence W. Brown)
- TNCA S-2
