= Bell H-12 =

1940s American military helicopter

R-12/H-12
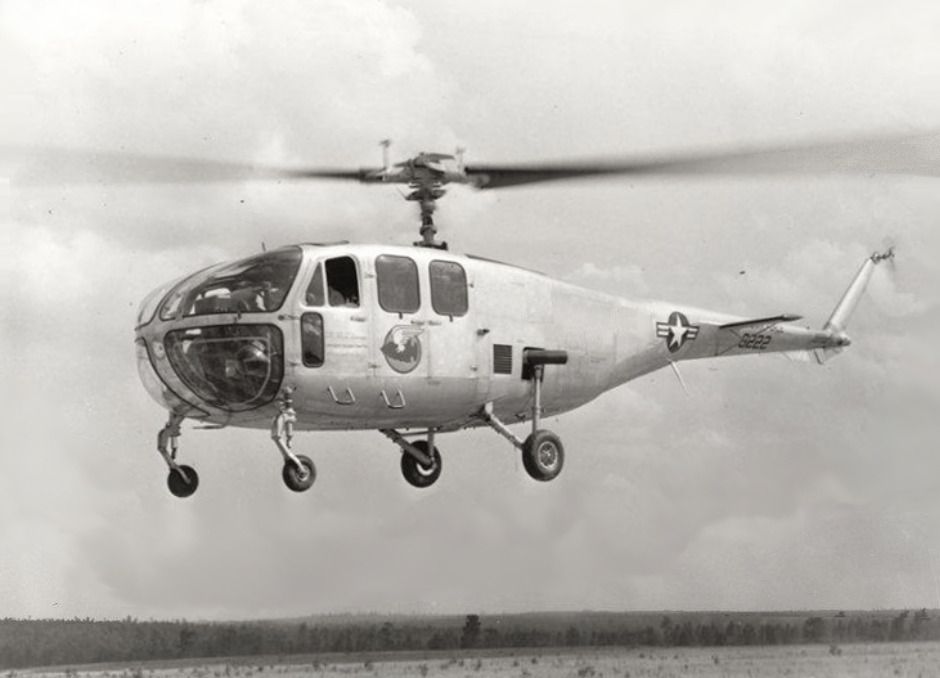
- YH-12B

General information
- Type: Military utility helicopter
- Manufacturer: Bell Aircraft
- Status: Pre-production
- Primary user: United States Air Force
- Number built: 13

History
- First flight: 1946

The Bell R-12 (later redesignated H-12; company Model 48) was an American 1940s military utility helicopter built by the Bell Helicopter company. The design did not go into full production, but over a dozen prototypes were used for various tests and projects.

== Design and development ==
During 1946, Bell Helicopter began development of a new utility helicopter, the Model 42, much larger than the Model 47, which utilized a scaled-up version of the Model 47's rotor system. Three prototypes were built, but serious rotor problems and complexity of mechanical systems precluded production. The initial Model 42 variant was civilian, but the United States Air Force ordered the development of its military variant, the Model 48. Two prototypes were ordered as the XR-12, powered by a single 540 hp (403 kW) Pratt & Whitney R-1340-AN-1 radial engine and featuring seating for five. Of very similar construction to the Model 42, the Model 48 had a shorter rotor mast. A production batch of 34 helicopters was ordered, under the designation R-12A, but cancelled in 1947.

Another enlarged prototype (the XR-12B, Model 48A) with seats for eight plus two pilots and a more powerful 600 hp (447 kW) Pratt & Whitney R-1340-55 engine was also ordered, followed by ten pre-series YR-12B helicopters, with a glazed nose, instead of the car-like nose of the Model 42 and XR-12. While under flight test the helicopter was redesignated the H-12, but the results were not satisfactory, as there were major problems with the main rotor due to blade weaving and poor rotor governor performance.

== Operational history ==
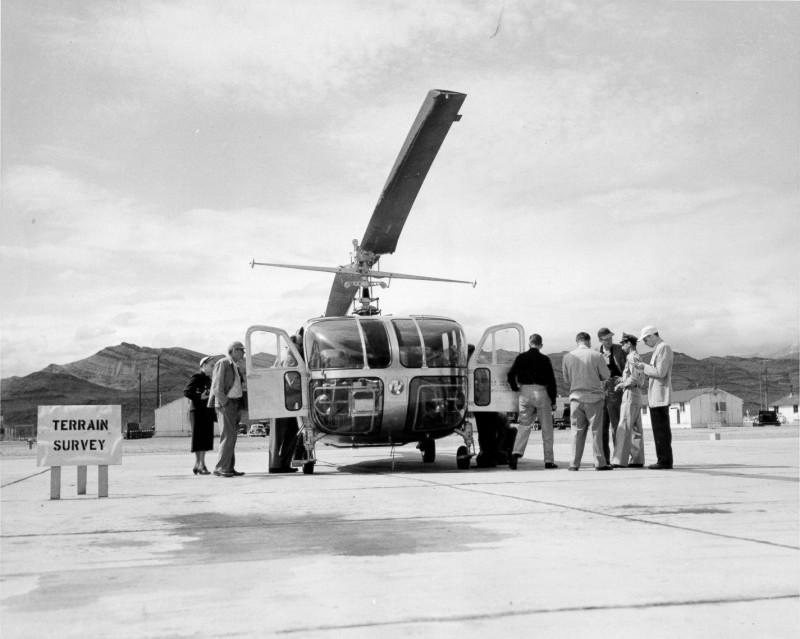
Journalists and news reported examine a Model 12, which was used to survey the area after a nuclear test in Nevada. April 21, 1952.

No production H-12 aircraft were built but the prototypes and preproduction aircraft were used for various test and development programs.

It was unofficially known as the "Fat Boy".

== Variants ==
Model 42
Bell's initial foray into the civilian luxury helicopter market, seating five. Three prototypes were built but serious problems precluded production.
Model 48
Company designation for the military version of the Model 42, given the designation R-12. Two built as XR-12s and a production contract for 34 was cancelled in 1947.
Model 48A
The more powerful derivative of the Model 48 with a 600 hp engine and ten seats. One XR-12B/XH-12B prototype was produced and a preproduction batch of ten were also built as YR-12B/YH-12Bs
XR-12
Prototype, redesignated XH-12, two built.
R-12A
Production version, 34 on order canceled.
XR-12B
Prototype with more powerful engine and increased seating, redesignated XH-12B, one built.
YR-12B
As XR-12B but with R-1340-55 engines, redesignated YH-12B, ten built.
XH-12
XR-12 redesignated in 1947.
XH-12B
XR-12B redesignated in 1947.
YH-12B
YR-12B redesignated in 1947.

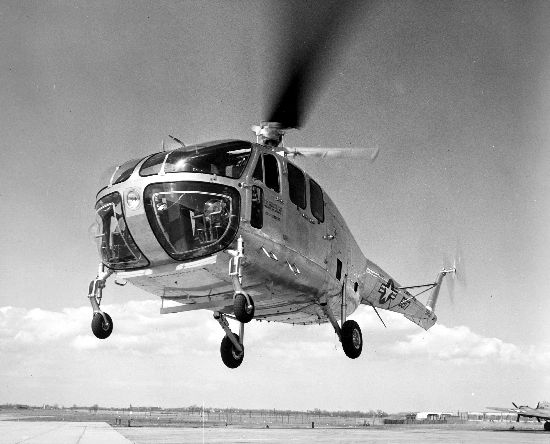
A YH-12B

== Operators ==
United States

- United States Air Force

== Specifications (XR-12B) ==
Data from Bell Aircraft since 1935

General characteristics

- Crew: one
- Capacity: nine
- Length: 56 ft 9 in (17.30 m)
- Height: 11 ft 3.25 in (3.4354 m)
- Gross weight: 6,286 lb (2,851 kg)
- Powerplant: 1 × Pratt & Whitney R-1340-55 Wasp 9-cyl. air-cooled radial piston engine, 600 hp (450 kW)
- Main rotor diameter: 47 ft 6 in (14.48 m)
- Main rotor area: 1,772 sq ft (164.6 m^{2})

Performance

- Maximum speed: 105 mph (169 km/h, 91 kn)
- Cruise speed: 90 mph (140 km/h, 78 kn)
- Range: 300 mi (480 km, 260 nmi)
- Service ceiling: 12,800 ft (3,900 m) Service ceiling
  - Absolute ceiling: 15,000 ft (4,572 m)
  - Hover ceiling: 4,350 ft (1,326 m)

== See also ==
Related development

- Bell Model 47
- Agusta-Bell AB.102

Aircraft of comparable role, configuration, and era

- Sikorsky H-19 Chickasaw
