= Anzani 6-cylinder =

1910s French piston aircraft engine

Anzani 6
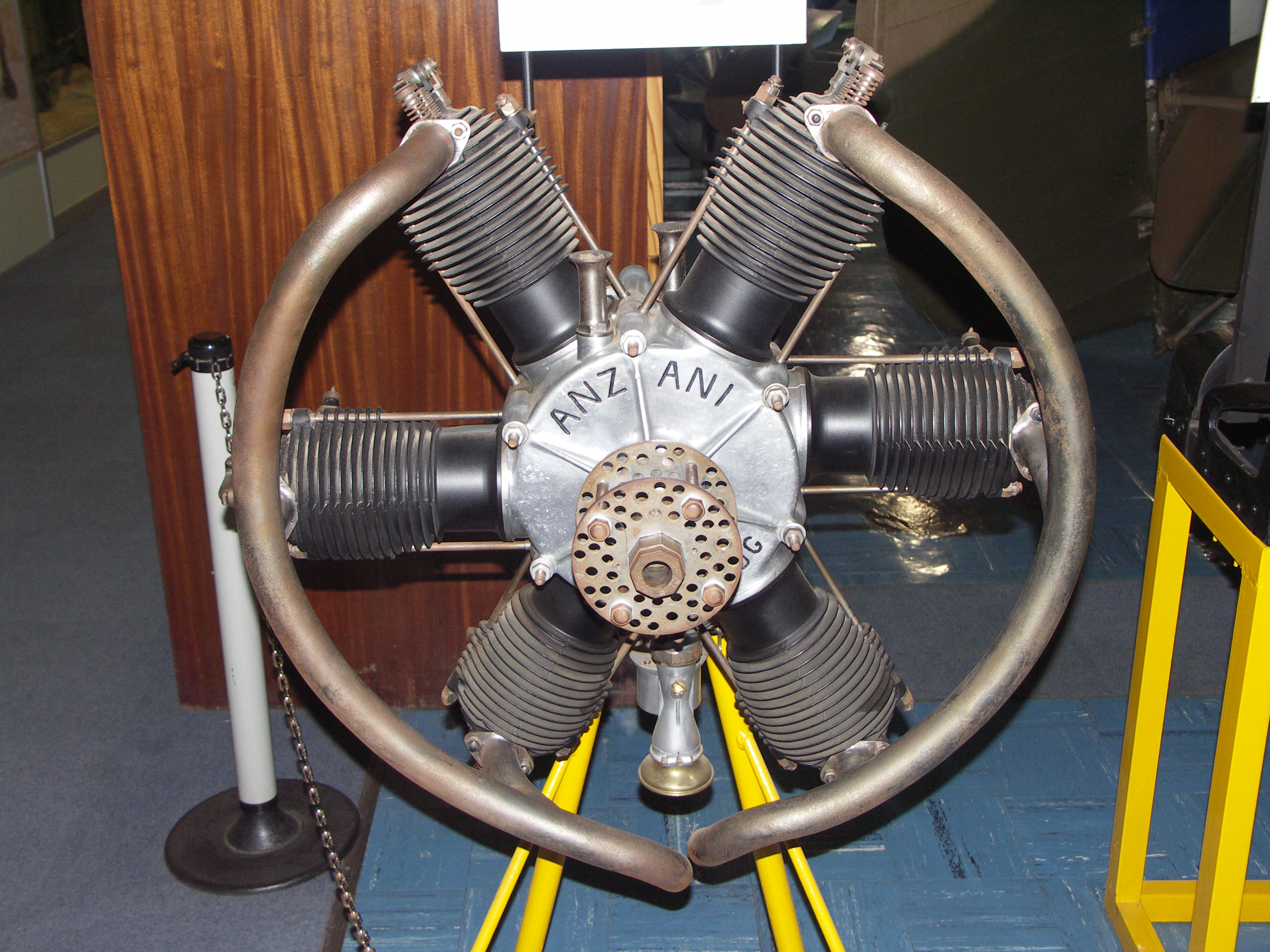
- 45 hp Anzani 6, propeller side. The carburettor is visible between the two lower cylinders.
- Type: 6-cylinder air-cooled two-row radial
- National origin: France
- Manufacturer: Anzani
- Designer: Alessandro Anzani
- First run: 1910
- Developed from: 3- cylinder Y engine

Alessandro Anzani developed the first two-row radial from his earlier 3- cylinder Y engine by merging two onto the same crankshaft with a common crankweb.

== Development ==
By December 1909 Anzani had a 3-cylinder air-cooled true radial engine running, developed from the earlier 3-cylinder fan configuration engines (semi-radials) that had powered Bleriot across the Channel. By about March 1910 he had completed the first two-row radial engine, a 6-cylinder unit made by merging two 3-cylinder units together, one slightly behind the other and at an angle of 60°. The engine therefore had a lot in common with the early 3-cylinder motors: cylinders were a single iron casting with built-in valve cells and ribs, and pistons were steel with cast-iron rings. The early versions were side-valve engines with automatic (atmospheric pressure opened) inlet valves and exhaust valves mechanically operated via cams in the crankcase. By the end of 1912, as with the smaller engines the exhaust valves were moved to the cylinder heads and operated by push-rods and rockers. The exhaust valves were at the front of the engine, with the fuel inlet manifold at the rear. A prominent pair of 150° exhaust tubes were fitted. Plugs were mounted in the cylinder sides, in the plane of the engine and on the upper side to minimise plug fouling by lubricant.

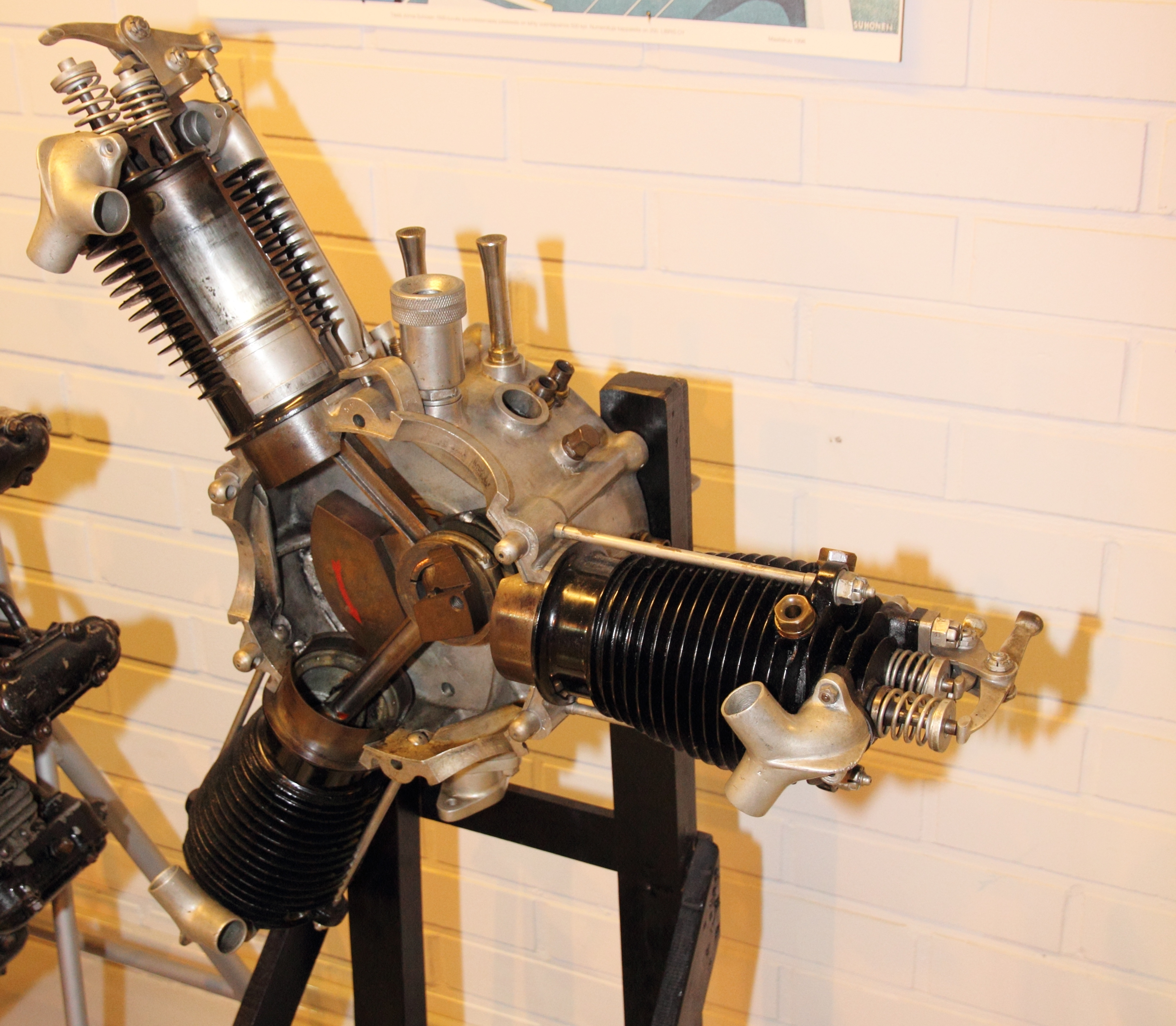
Showing how the six-cylinder engine was built from two three cylinder halves

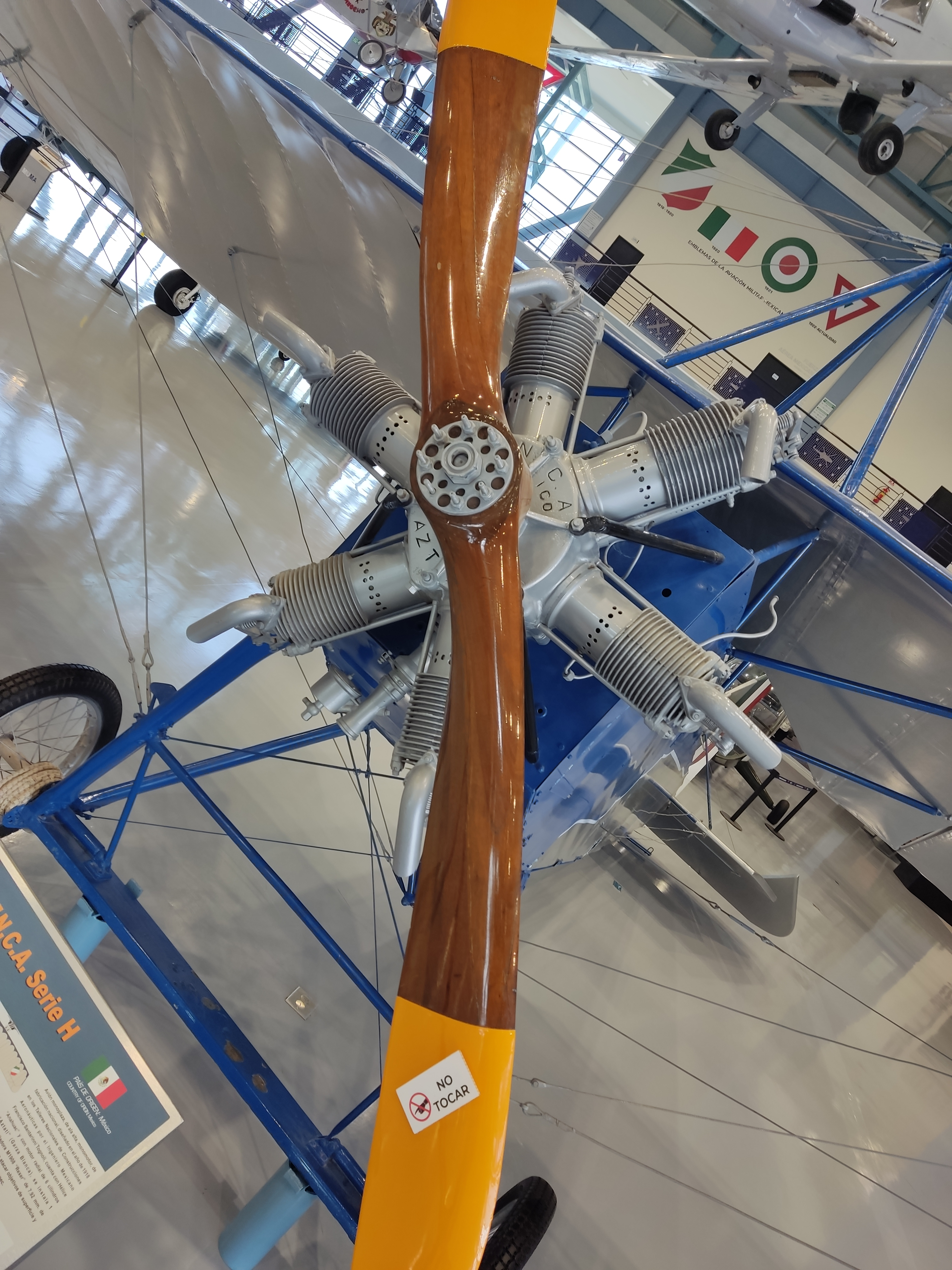
A T.N.C.A. Aztatl with an Anáhuac propeller mounted on a TNCA Serie H at Museo Militar de Aviación.

The crankcase was an aluminium casting and in later models contained a fuel mixing chamber. These later versions also used long bolts to attach the cylinders to the crankcase. The engine used a single, kinked crankweb, coupled to slim but broad connecting rods in order to minimise the axial displacement between the two rows. This was less than in more recent double row radials, the rear face of the front row falling on the centre plane of the back row. The engine was not strictly a radial, as the crankweb geometry slightly offset the centres of the two rows, an arrangement best seen from the back of the engine, where the superimposed inlet tubes and push-rods of the later engine highlight the cylinder centre lines. Such an offset between cylinder centre line and crankshaft is often termed désaxé.

The earliest of the 6-cylinder radials had a bore of 90 mm and stroke of 120 mm giving a displacement of 4.58 litres (280 cu in) and an output of 34 kW (45 hp) at 1,300 rpm. Its weight was 70 kg (154 lbs). A later version produced 45 kW (60 hp) from 6.23 litres (380 cu in).

== Variants ==
45 hp (34 kW)
Anzani's first two-row radial developed 34 kW (45 hp) from 4.58 L (280 cu in) displacement.
60 hp (45 kW)
Larger cylinders gave 45 kW (60 hp) at 1,300 rpm from 6.23 L (380 cu in ) displacement.
TNCA Aztatl
A direct copy of the 60 hp 6-cylinder Anzani, produced in Mexico by TNCA (Talleres Nacionales de Construcciones Aeronáuticas - national aviation workshops).

== Applications ==
Aeromarine EO
Austin Whippet
Caudron Type Caudron-Fabre
Caudron Type N
Caudron C.114
Działowski D.K.D.3
Działowski D.K.D.4
Farman Scout
Gabriel Śląsk
Laird B-4
Perry Beadle T.2
TNCA Serie A
TNCA Serie H
Westland Woodpigeon II

== Specifications (60 hp overhead valve) ==
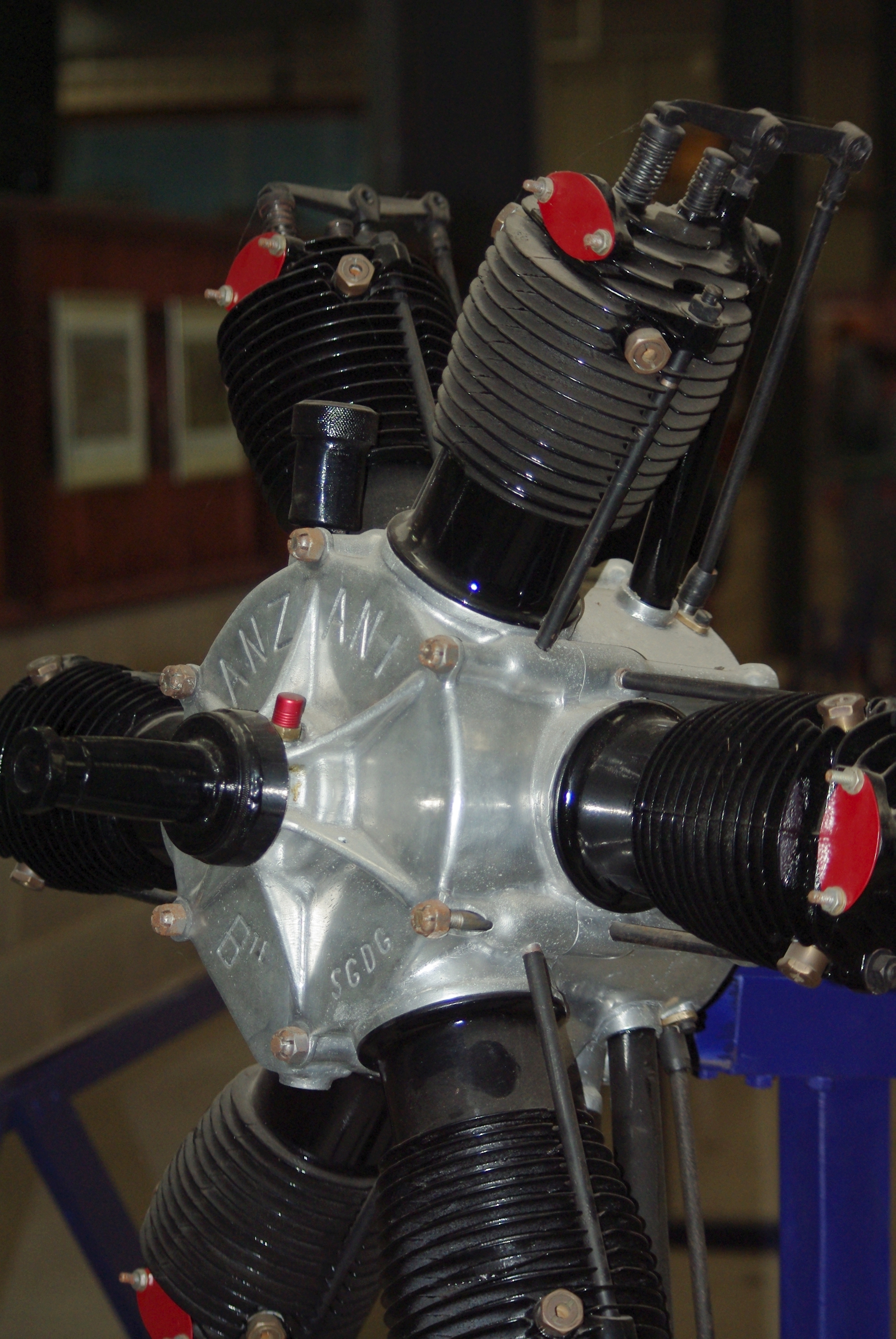
Shuttleworth Collection engine

Data from Flight

=== General characteristics ===
- Type: 6-cylinder double row air-cooled radial
- Bore: 105 mm (4.13 in)
- Stroke: 120 mm (4.72 in)
- Displacement: 6.23 litres (379 cu in )
- Dry weight: 91 kg (200 lb)

=== Components ===
- Valvetrain: automatic inlet valves, mechanical exhaust valves driven by crankcase cam-operated pushrods and rockers. One inlet, one exhaust per cylinder
- Fuel system: carburettor, mixing chamber in crankcase.
- Oil system: splash lubricated
- Cooling system: air-cooled, finned cylinders
- ignition: single magneto, one plug/cylinder

=== Performance ===
- Power output: 45 kW (60 hp) at 1,300 rpm
- Power-to-weight ratio: 0.49 kW/kg (0.30 hp/lb)

== See also ==
Related lists

- List of aircraft engines
