= TNCA Serie B =

Reconnaissance biplane

TNCA Serie B "Puro"

General information
- Type: Reconnaissance aircraft
- National origin: Mexico
- Manufacturer: TNCA
- Designer: Ángel Lascurain y Osio
- Status: retired
- Primary user: Mexican Air Force
- Number built: 6

History
- First flight: December 7, 1920
- Developed from: TNCA Serie A

The TNCA B Series was a single-engine reconnaissance biplane built in Mexico by Talleres Nacionales de Construcciones Aeronáuticas (National Aircraft Construction Workshops).

== Design and development ==
In 1920, Ángel Lascurain y Osio was appointed director of TNCA. Under his direction, an airplane was built based on the structure of the TNCA Serie A, to which major modifications were made, such as larger dimensions and the adaptation of a Salmson 9-cylinder radial engine, the prototype received the registration 1-B-72.

After successful demonstrations of this aircraft, the government authorized the construction of five more examples, which were affectionately dubbed "puros" (cigars), due to their wide tubular fuselages, which was the main difference compared to the TNCA Serie A. Four examples were each equipped with two Thompson 11.43 mm caliber machine guns in the rear cabin. The TNC Serie B demonstrated reliability and also the ability to land and take off on unprepared surfaces.

== Operational history ==
The first flight was made on December 7, 1920, flying the Balbuena-Pachuca-Balbuena route with Lieutenant Fernando Proal as a pilot and Colonel Reynaldo Híjar as a passenger. This same aircraft made a long-distance flight between January 7 and January 17, 1921, covering the Mexico-Veracruz-Tampico-Rodríguez-Ébano-Tampico-San Luis Potosí-Mexico route, making a total distance of 2,000 kilometers (1,243 milles). The six aircraft were operated by the Mexican Air Force from their base at Mexicali, in anti-smuggling flights.

== Specifications ==
Data from Mexican Aviation History, Airwar.ru

General characteristics

- Crew: one
- Capacity: one gunner
- Length: 7.82 m (25 ft 8 in)
- Wingspan: 12.4 m (40 ft 8 in)
- Height: 3.1 m (10 ft 2 in)
- Powerplant: 1 × Salmson 9AB Nine-cylinder single-row supercharged air-cooled radial engine, 186 kW (249 hp)

Performance

- Maximum speed: 129 km/h (80 mph, 70 kn)
- Cruise speed: 105 km/h (65 mph, 57 kn)
- Service ceiling: 6,000 m (20,000 ft)
