= Sea Teziutlán =

Mexican training aircraft

TGAM/Sea Teziutlán

General information
- Type: Trainer aircraft
- National origin: Mexico
- Manufacturer: Talleres Generales de Aeronáutica Militar
- Designer: Antonio Sea
- Status: retired
- Primary user: Mexican Air Force
- Number built: 6

History
- Manufactured: 1941-1942
- First flight: February 24, 1942

The Sea Teziutlán was a primary training aircraft designed by the engineer Antonio Sea and built by Talleres Generales de Aeronáutica Militar.

== Design and development ==
In 1940 General Roberto Fierro Villalobos was re-appointed as commander of the Mexican Air Force and director of the Talleres Generales de Reparaciones Aeronáuticas (TGAM, General Workshops of Military Aeronautics), which were formerly called "Talleres Nacionales de Construcciones Aeronáuticas (TNCA)", taking the initiative to finance an aircraft project designed by the engineer Antonio Sea, which would be built in the workshops of Teziutlán, Puebla (hence its name).

It was a design of two open cabins in tandem configuration, with fuselage built in metal and wings made of wood with fixed landing gear. It was powered by a 125-horsepower Lycoming O-290 4-cylinder air-cooled horizontally opposed piston engine. With the exception of the engine, the aircraft had 95% of parts manufactured in Mexico.

The first flight was completed on February 24, 1942, satisfactorily fulfilling many requirements, so the Mexican government ordered the construction of 50 copies of this model. However, when Antonio Cárdenas Rodríguez was appointed as the new commander of the Air Force, the serial production of the Teziutlan was discontinued, with only 6 copies completed, which operated in various training squadrons of the Mexican Air Force.

The reason why Teziutlán was discontinued was because it was apparently cheaper to buy Fairchild PT-19 aircraft than to continue with the production of Mexican aircraft.

== Specifications ==
Data from Innovación y Defensa MX, airwar.ru

General characteristics

- Crew: 2
- Length: 7.28 m (23 ft 11 in)
- Wingspan: 11.66 m (38 ft 3 in)
- Height: 1.9 m (6 ft 3 in)
- Wing area: 15.23 m^{2} (163.9 sq ft)
- Empty weight: 447 kg (985 lb)
- Max takeoff weight: 741 kg (1,634 lb)
- Powerplant: 1 × Lycoming O-290 4-cylinder air-cooled horizontally opposed piston engine, 93 kW (125 hp)

Performance

- Maximum speed: 175 km/h (109 mph, 94 kn)
- Cruise speed: 155 km/h (96 mph, 84 kn)
- Minimum control speed: 39 km/h (24 mph, 21 kn)
- Range: 1,237 km (769 mi, 668 nmi)
- Service ceiling: 7,900 m (25,900 ft)
