= Działowski D.K.D.3 =

Polish, single seat, parasol-wing sports aircraft

D.K.D.3

General information
- Type: Single seat sports
- National origin: Poland
- Designer: Stanisław Działowski
- Number built: 1

History
- First flight: 3 October 1927

The D.K.D.3 was a Polish, single seat, parasol-wing sports aircraft first flown in 1927. Only one was built but flew in demonstrations and in national competitions into the early 1930s.

== Design and development ==
Early in the summer of 1927 the Działowski brothers, Stanisław and Mieczysław, moved their aircraft building activities from Bydgoszcz to Kraków-Rakowice where the military unit was much more sympathetic to amateurs and allowed the use of their workshops. They also brought with them the remains of the Działowski D.K.D.1 which had crash landed near Warsaw after attending an exhibition.

Their next design was the D.K.D.3, a parasol-wing single-seater which reused the wing and empennage of the D.K.D.1, combining them with a new engine, fuselage and undercarriage. The wing was built around two spars and fabric covered and the primary bracing was a parallel pair of struts on each side from the lower fuselage longerons to the spars. Centrally the wing was braced over the fuselage on a transverse pair of steel inverted V-struts from the spars. The generous balances on its ailerons extended beyond the squared wing tips.

The D.K.D.3 had a more powerful engine than its predecessor, a 34 kW (45 hp) six cylinder Anzani 6 radial engine mounted completely exposed for cooling and with duralumin fuselage covering immediately behind. Further aft the fuselage structure was a rectangular section, welded steel tube girder, with wooden frames, stringers and fabric covering producing an oval cross-section apart from a flat underside. Its open cockpit was under the trailing edge cut-out.

Both fin and tailplane, the latter located on top of the fuselage, were small and rectangular in shape, mounting large, balanced control surfaces. These were also approximately rectangular but the bottom of the rudder was cut at an angle to allow the one-piece elevator to operate. All the rear surfaces were wooden framed and fabric covered.

Its undercarriage, much taller than that of the D.K.D.1, was fixed and of the tailskid type, with mainwheels with rubber cord shock absorbers on a single axle. The axle was mounted on steel tube V-struts from the lower fuselage longerons at the bases of the wing bracing struts and transversely braced with a V-strut from the forward strut bases.

== Operational history ==
Construction in just nine weeks and a first flight on 3 October 1927, flown by its designer, allowed the D.K.D.3 to compete in the First National Lightplane Contest at Warsaw, flying there from Kraków on 4 October. It was well placed after early tests but during a cross-country flight a magneto failed and the time lost dropped the D.K.D.3 to a final fourth place out of six.

The following year Działowski received funding from Mielec, his home town, to maintain and develop the D.K.D.3. With their crest on the fin and assisted by the LOPP, he flew it in a series of local demonstrations to raise funds for the Działowski D.K.D.4, a new aircraft which won the 1928 second National Lightplane Contest. The D.K.D.3 also competed in the 1928 competition and came third from twelve. It continued to demonstrate and compete at least to 1930, when it took part in the third National Lightplane Contest but once again dropped out during a cross-country test and was damaged. Over its career the D.K.D.3 made some 1,800 flights and logged 431 flying hours; on 1 July 1933 SP-ACR, its final Polish civil registration, was withdrawn from use.

== Specifications ==
Data from Cynk (1971) except where noted

General characteristics

- Crew: One
- Length: 5.2 m (17 ft 1 in)
- Wingspan: 8.4 m (27 ft 7 in)
- Height: 2.08 m (6 ft 10 in)
- Wing area: 12 m^{2} (130 sq ft)
- Empty weight: 299 kg (659 lb)
- Max takeoff weight: 470 kg (1,036 lb)
- Powerplant: 1 × Anzani 6 6-cylinder radial, 45 kW (60 hp)
- Propellers: 2-bladed

Performance

- Maximum speed: 125 km/h (78 mph, 67 kn) at sea level
- Cruise speed: 110 km/h (68 mph, 59 kn)
- Stall speed: 72 km/h (45 mph, 39 kn) minimum speed
- Range: 500 km (310 mi, 270 nmi)
- Service ceiling: 3,800 m (12,500 ft)
- Time to altitude: 30 min to 2,885 m (9,465 ft)
- Take-off distance:70 m (230 ft)
- Landing distance: 90 m (300 ft)
