= Działowski D.K.D.4 =

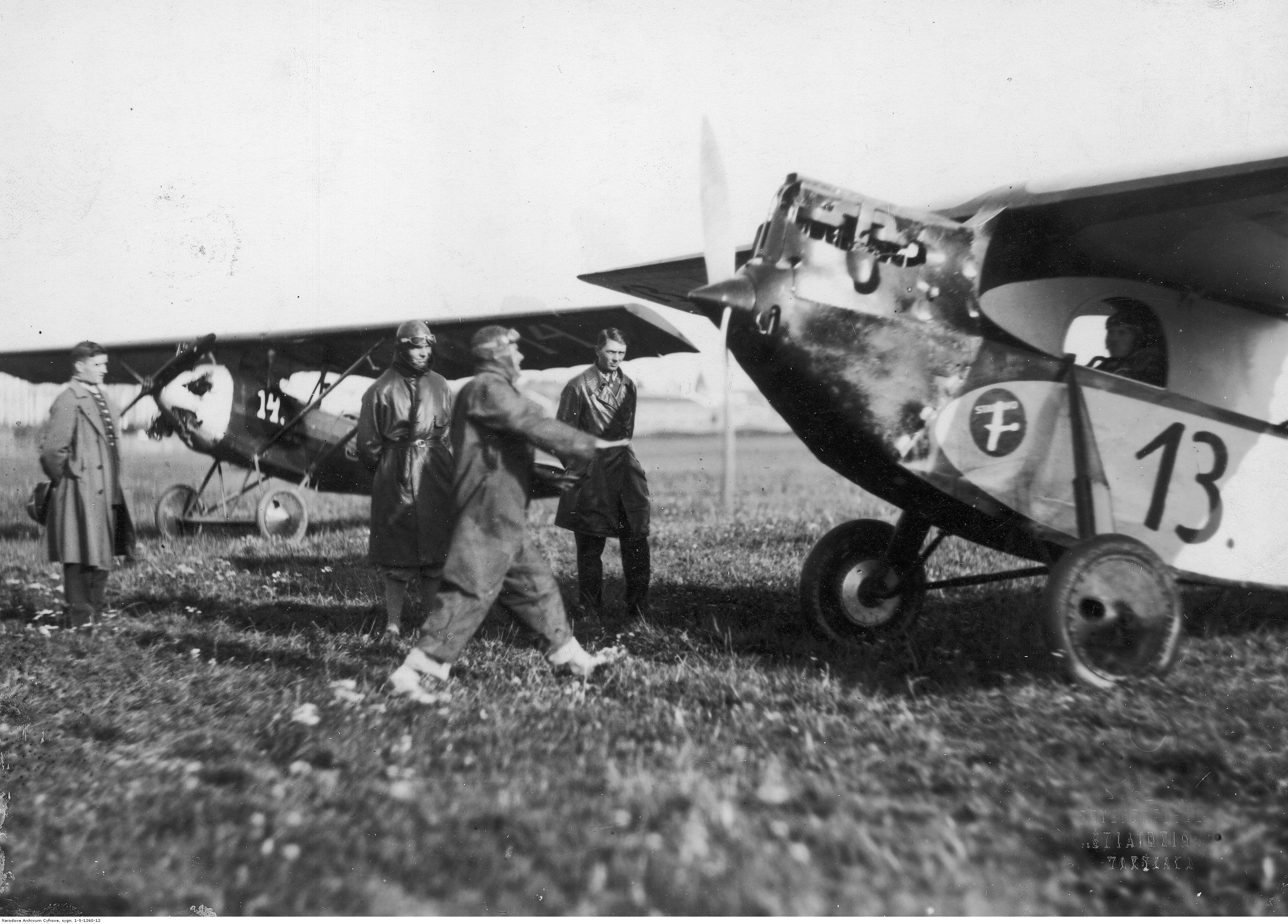
- (in the background)

General information
- Type: Two-seat sports aircraft
- National origin: Poland
- Designer: Stanisław Działowski
- Number built: 3

History
- First flight: September 1928

The Działowski D.K.D.4 was a Polish, parasol-wing, sports two-seater built in 1928. One won the Second National Lightplane Contest, with another coming fifth.

== Design and development ==
Following their experience with the Działowski D.K.D.3 at the first National Lightplane Contest in 1927, the Działowski brothers, Stanisław and Mieczysław, set about designing and funding their entrant to the following year's competition. Several established Polish aircraft companies offered both easy terms for purchase of material and free assembly and both the Kraków branch of LOPP and the Kraków Aeroclub agreed to buy an example. LOPP decided to use a 34 kW (45 hp) Anzani 6 six-cylinder radial engine, the Działowskis' original choice, but the Aeroclub selected a 41 kW (55 hp), five cylinder Siemens-Halske Sh 4 radial. The latter was initially designated D.K.D.5, soon revised to D.K.D.4bis.

The D.K.D.4 was a two-seat parasol monoplane with a three part, wooden, two spar, fabric covered wing which was trapezoidal in plan. The central section was mounted on two outward-leaning pairs of steel cabane struts from the upper fuselage, one to each spar and each outer panel was braced to the lower fuselage longerons with a pair of steel struts to the spars. Its wingtip ailerons were short and broad. There was a large semi-circular cut-out in the central trailing edge to ease cockpit access and enhance the upward field of view.

Its fuselage was similar to that of the D.K.D.3, which had a welded steel tube girder structure with wooden frames, stringers and fabric covering, producing an oval cross-section apart from a flat underside. The radial engines of both versions were mounted with their cylinders exposed but otherwise under a duralumin cowling.

The D.K.D.4's empennage was conventional and tidier than that of its predecessor. Its trapezoidal horizontal tail was mounted on top of the fuselage and its similarly shaped fin mounted a rectangular, unbalanced rudder which reached down to the keel, working in a cut-out between the elevators. Their steel tube structure was fabric covered. Larger area, balanced rudders area were added to both examples in late 1929, together with larger ailerons.

The prototypes had simple, single axle, fixed landing gear with two V-struts with a bracing crossbar between their vertices, though the sole production example dispensed with the crossbar.

The D.K.D.4 and the 4bis both made their first flights in September 1928. This gave time for trials and development before the second National Lightplane Contest, which started on 29 October with twelve contestants. The contest was won by the D.K.D.4, piloted by Jozef Bargiel and the D.K.D.4bis, piloted by Karczmarczyk, came fifth. The D.K.D.3, flown by its designer, came third.

The D.K.D.4's success in the Contest brought military interest in it as a trainer and an order for twenty-five was provisionally agreed. The Działowski brothers set up a company, Bracia Działowski, to manufacture them but the government failed to ratify the contract and only one production D.K.D.4 was completed. It had an active career, flying in contests and meetings with some success.

The later D.K.D.5 was a fully aerobatic and final development of the D.K.D.4 design. It was powered by a 63 kW (85 hp) Cirrus III four cylinder upright air-cooled inline engine mounted exposed. An aerodynamic clean-up included a divided undercarriage with cranked axles and a long oleo strut from the outer axle to the upper longeron on each side. Its wings were foldable and their span and area were 11% greater than the D.K.D.4. It first flew in July 1930, piloted by its designer. Despite a slight increase in weight over the D.K.D.4bis, the large increase of power and the clean-up raised its maximum speed to 175 km/h (109 mph), gave it a ceiling of 4,500 m (14,800 ft) and enabled it to reach 1,000 m (3,300 ft) in six minutes.

The D.K.D.5 did not reach the Warsaw Second International Tourism Challenge as it was badly damaged in an emergency landing after a fuel pipe broke during its flight to Warsaw. It was rebuilt and operated by the Kraków Aeroclub and competed in competitions and rallies.

== Variants ==
W.K.D.4
LOPP example plus sole production airframe with 34 kW (45 hp) Anzani 6 radial engine.
W.K.D.4bis
Kraków Aeroclub example with 41 kW (55 hp) Siemens-Halske Sh 4 radial engine.
W.K.D.5
Cleaned-up airframe with divided undercarriage and 63 kW (85 hp) Cirrus III inline engine.

== Specifications (D.K.D.4bis) ==
Data from Cynk (1971)

General characteristics

- Crew: One
- Capacity: One passenger
- Length: 5.6 m (18 ft 4 in)
- Wingspan: 9 m (29 ft 6 in)
- Height: 2.28 m (7 ft 6 in)
- Wing area: 13.5 m^{2} (145 sq ft)
- Empty weight: 345 kg (761 lb)
- Gross weight: 638 kg (1,407 lb)
- Powerplant: 1 × Siemens-Halske Sh 4 5-cylinder radial, 41 kW (55 hp)
- Propellers: 2-bladed

Performance

- Maximum speed: 140 km/h (87 mph, 76 kn) at sea level
- Cruise speed: 125 km/h (78 mph, 67 kn)
- Service ceiling: 3,000 m (9,800 ft)
- Time to altitude: 23 min to 2,000 m (6,600 ft)
