= TNCA Serie E =

Mexican monoplane family

TNCA Serie E "Sonora" / "México" / "Tololoche" / "Quetzalcóatl"
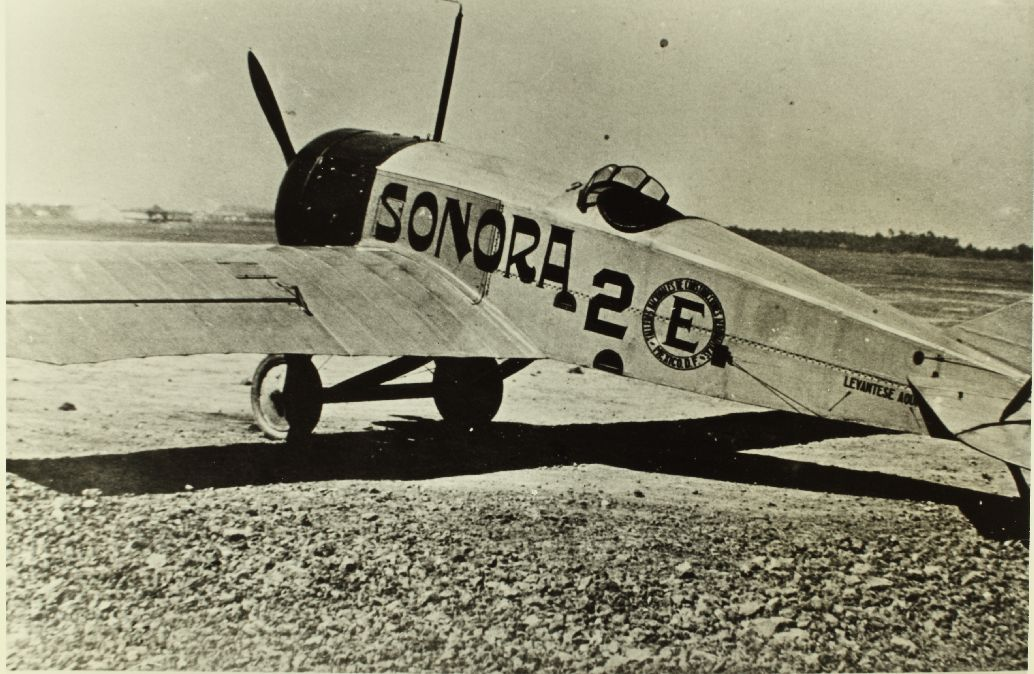
- T.N.C.A. Serie E "Sonora"

General information
- Type: Monoplane
- National origin: Mexico
- Manufacturer: TNCA
- Designer: Ángel Lascurain y Osio; Antonio Sea
- Status: Retired
- Primary user: Mexican Air Force
- Number built: 7

History
- First flight: 2 March 1922

The TNCA Serie E was a family of various monoplanes built in Mexico by the Talleres Nacionales de Construcciones Aeronáuticas (National Aeronautical Construction Workshops).

== Design and development ==
The first aircraft of the Serie E family was a low-wing monoplane with registration number 2-E-98, which was dubbed "Sonora", this airplane made its first flight on March 2, 1922. It was powered by an 82 kW (110 hp) le Rhône 9J 9-cylinder rotary engine, exceeding expectations, with performance significantly higher than similar aircraft at the time. Despite its benefits, the plane was not produced in series, because for was the Technical Consultant of the Aviation Department Ralph O'Neill, the aircraft could not be used for military purposes. The "Sonora" was in service with the Mexican Air Force until 1925 and later dismantled, being sold to a private individual.

Ángel Lascurain and Antonio Sea made a redesign of the "Sonora", this time it was a high-wing monoplane that received the registration 3-E-130 and was nicknamed "Tololoche", which made its first flight at the end of March 1923. The "Tololoche" was powered by a 160-horsepower Le Rhône 18E air-cooled 18-cylinder rotary engine in 2 rows, also it had two machine guns synchronized with the propeller. Fuselage was made in a monocoque structure covered entirely in wood. Wings were semi-rigid covered with plywood, which were easy to disassemble by using two pins.

In June 1923, a prototype similar to the "Tololoche" was built but with larger dimensions, which received the registration 4-E-131 and was nicknamed "Quetzalcóatl" or "Tololoche grande" because of its great resemblance to the "Tololoche". The "Quetzlcóatl" was powered by a 138 kW (185 hp) BMW IIIa 6-cylinder water-cooled in-line engine and its fuselage was mostly built of wood. Four "Quetzlcóatl" were built, participating in observation and bombing flights during the Delahuertista rebellion.

Another prototype that was built almost simultaneously with the "Quetzalcoatl", received the registration 5-E-132, which was nicknamed "Mexico", this airplane had two seats side by side and was powered by an 60 kW (80 hp) le Rhône engine. It had his first flight on 21 August 1923.

== Variants ==
Serie E "Sonora"
Low-wing monoplane, it was the first version of the Serie E and was built only a single example driven by a 110 horsepower Le Rhône 9J engine. It received the registration 2-E-98.
Serie E "Tololoche"
High-wing monoplane used as a single-seat fighter, powered by a 160-horsepower Le Rhône 18E engine, It had 2 machine gun synchronized with the propeller. The only example received the registration number 3-E-130.
Serie E "Quetzalcóatl"
(Also called "Tololoche grande") similar to the Tololoche but with enlarged dimensions, it was powered by a 185 horsepower BMW IIIa engine. Four examples were built.
Serie E "México"
Version with side-by-side seats ("Sonora" and "Quetzalcoatl" had tandem configuration) powered by an 80 horsepower Le Rhône 9C engine. It was made only one example which received the registration 5-E-132.

== Specifications ==
Data from Mexican Aviation History, Airwar.ru: Sonora, Airwar.ru: Tololoche, Airwar.ru: Serie E (5-E-132), Airwar.ru: Quetzalcóatl

General characteristics

Performance

General characteristics	Sonora	Tololoche	Quetzalcóatl	México
Crew	1	1	1	1
Capacity	1 observer	0	1 observer / gunner	1 observer
Length	6.80 m (22 ft 4 in)	6.40 m (21 ft 0 in)	7.20 m (23 ft 7 in)	6.81 m (22 ft 4 in)
Wingspan	8.10 m (26 ft 7 in)	7.80 m (25 ft 7 in)	8.50 m (27 ft 11 in)	14.33 m (47 ft 0 in)
Height	2.10 m (6 ft 11 in)	2.40 m (7 ft 10 in)	2.74 m (9 ft 0 in)	2.59 m (8 ft 6 in)
Max takeoff weight	598 kg (1,318 lb)	860 kg (1,896 lb)	1,120 kg (2,469 lb)	798 kg (1,759 lb)
Empty weight	420 kg (926 lb)	679 kg (1,497 lb)	870 kg (1,918 lb)	579 kg (1,276 lb)
Wing area	17.80 m2 (191.6 ft2)	16.0 m2 (172.2 ft2)	22.4 m2 (241.1 ft2)	25.92 m2 (279 ft2)
Powerplant	1 × Le Rhône 9J, 110 HP	1 × Le Rhône 18E, 160 HP	1 × BMW IIIa, 185 HP	1 × Le Rhône 9C, 80 HP
Performance				
Cruise speed	105 km/h (65 mph, 57 kn)	195 km/h (121 mph, 105 kn)	160 km/h (99 mph, 86 kn)	95 km/h (59 mph, 51 kn)
Maximum speed	125 km/h (77 mph, 67 kn)	225 km/h (140 mph, 121 kn)	192 km/h (119 mph, 104 kn)	119 km/h (74 mph, 64 kn)
Endurance	n.a.	1.5 hr	1.5 hr	2 hr
Service ceiling	3,500 m (11,483 ft)	6,300 m (20,669)	n.a.	5,000 m (16,404 ft)
Rate of climb	n.a.	6.4 m/s (1,260 ft/m)	n.a.	n.a.
Armament				
Armament	n.a.	2 × 7.7mm front machine gun	2 × 7.7mm front machine gun Bombs dropped from the observer's cabin	n.a.

== See also ==
- TNCA Serie A
