= TNCA Serie H =

TNCA Serie H "Parasol"
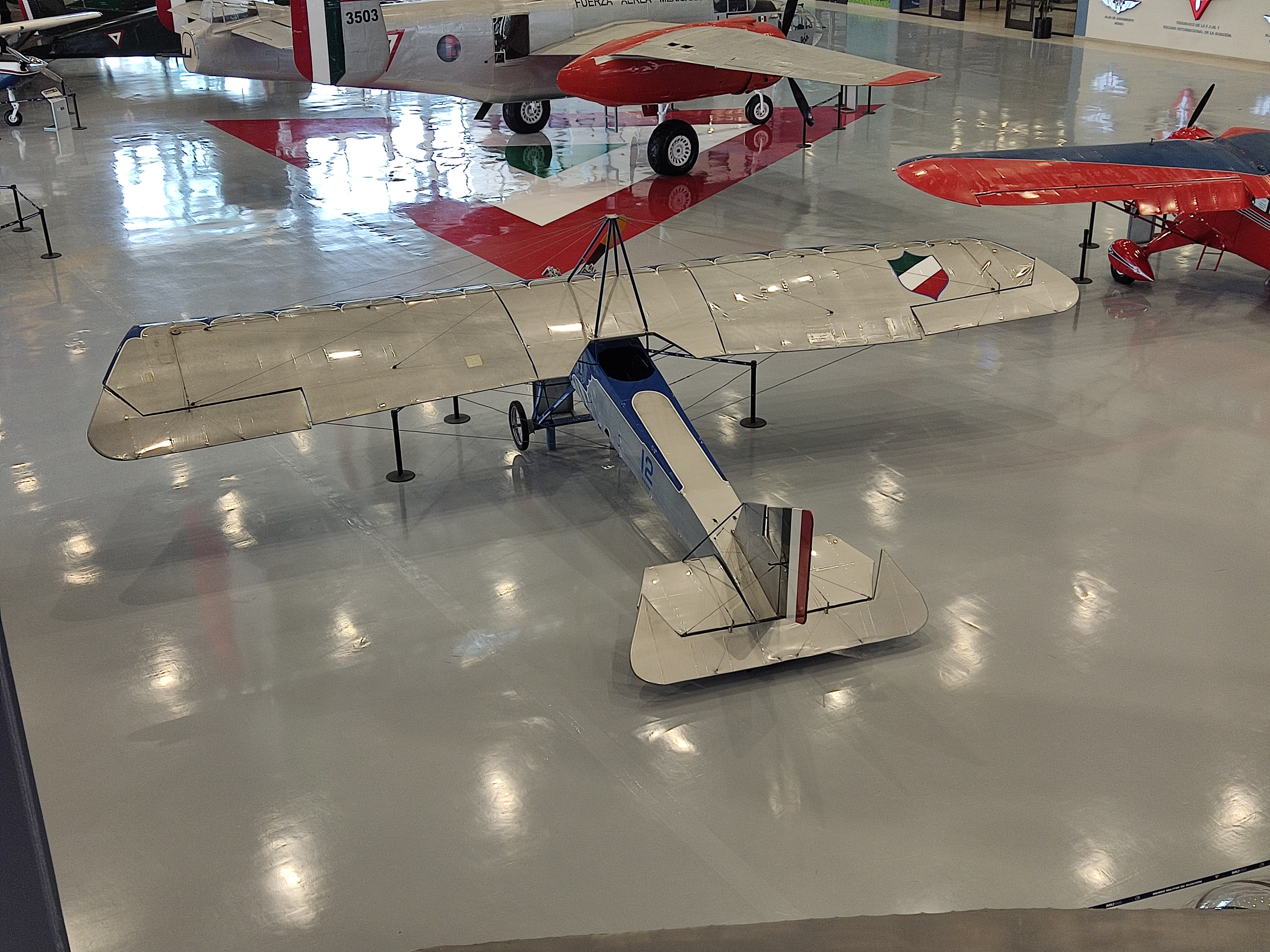
- TNCA Serie H in Museo Militar de Aviación

General information
- Type: Bomber
- National origin: Mexico
- Manufacturer: TNCA
- Status: retired
- Primary users: Mexican Air Force ->
- Number built: 13

History
- First flight: 1916

The TNCA Serie H "Parasol" was a Mexican bomber and reconnaissance aircraft manufactured by the Talleres Nacionales de Construcciones Aeronáuticas (TNCA). It was a high-wing monoplane (which was very unusual at the time), which allowed better speed performance. It was one of the first aircraft models made by TNCA and was designed as a "Technology Tester", to improve the designs of subsequent models. Its design was very similar to the Morane-Saulnier L, especially the design of the landing gear, mast and the controls of the rudders, however the fuselage structure was made of metal tubes. It was powered by a 60 HP TNCA Aztatl six cylinders air cooled engine, with an Anáhuac propeller.

The aircraft did not have fixed weapons, however side-shot machine guns could be mounted, and bombs could be carried under the fuselage.

One example of the Serie H is preserved at the Mexican Air Force Museum (Museo Militar de Aviacion) in Santa Lucía.

== Specifications ==
Data from Airwar.ru, SEDENA, Wikimedia commons

General characteristics

- Crew: 1
- Capacity: 1 gunner
- Length: 7.2 m (23 ft 7 in)
- Wingspan: 11.7 m (38 ft 5 in)
- Height: 3.6 m (11 ft 10 in)
- Wing area: 17 m^{2} (180 sq ft)
- Empty weight: 350 kg (772 lb)
- Powerplant: 1 × TNCA Aztatl 6-cylinder air-cooled radial piston engine, 45 kW (60 hp)
- Propellers: 2-bladed Anáhuac

Performance

- Cruise speed: 120 km/h (75 mph, 65 kn)
- Range: 333 km (207 mi, 180 nmi)
- Service ceiling: 1,800 m (6,000 ft)

Armament

- 1 × 7.92 mm Rexer Machine gun
- 6 × 12 lb (5.4 kg) Chapultepec Bombs
