= Elivie =

Italian helicopter airline

IATA	ICAO	Call sign
—	EV	—
- Founded: 23 November 1956
- Commenced operations: 20 July 1959
- Ceased operations: 30 June 1971
- Hubs: Aeroporto di Napoli-Capodichino
- Fleet size: 15
- Destinations: Capri, Ischia, Sorrento
- Key people: Giovanni Buonamico; Marcello Mainetti
- Employees: 18

Elivie-Societá Italiana Esercizio Elicotteri was a helicopter airline operating scheduled passenger services between the city of Naples, and the nearby islands of Capri and Ischia and, subsequently, also Sorrento village. It operated also charter flights.

== History ==
The airline was established in November 1956 as ELI-Linee Italiane S.p.A. with capital provided by IRI and Alitalia (90%). In 1959, the company was renamed Elivie. It started operations on July 20, 1959. At the beginning it operated Agusta Bell 47J Ranger and Agusta-Bell AB.102 helicopters. Initially the routes were limited to the summer months only, but from 1960 high season they became stable for all months of the year. In the summer of 1961 and the following one, a connection was operated, for a time, between Milan-Malpensa airport and the Turin city heliport. Later on both Agusta-Bell 204s and Agusta-Bell 206As were operated.

In 1967, the airline acquired two twin engine Sikorsky S-61 turbine powered helicopters. In 1968 the company's share package was acquired by ATI-Aero Trasporti Italiani. In October 1969 Elivie carried 34,821 passengers. In 1970, Alitalia halted the Elivie operations, because they were unprofitable. A year before, IRI had retired their shareholding. The company continued to carry out only aerial work, in particular the connection with the oil drilling platforms in the Mediterranean Sea.

According to a timetable from April 1, 1968, Elivie was operating scheduled passenger flights with Sikorsky S-61N helicopters configured with 26 seats from both the Naples International Airport (also known as Capodichino Airport) and from the helipad located close to the maritime station (civil port) to and from the islands of Capri and Ischia and also to and from Sorrento on the Amalfi Coast as well as between Capri and Ischia and Capri and Sorrento with several daily flights.

== Fleet ==
Elivie fleet
Aircraft	Total	Introduced	Retired	Notes
Agusta Bell 47J Ranger	4	1959	1970	I-EUNO, I-EDUE, I-ETRE, I-EQAT
Agusta-Bell AB.102	2	1961	1965	I-ECIN, I-ESEI
Agusta-Bell 204	5	1963	1971	I-ESET, I-EOT, I-ENOV, I-EVCA, I-EVCO
Agusta-Bell 206A	2	1968	1971	I-EVBA, I-EVBU
Sikorsky S-61N	2	1968	1971	I-EVMA, I-EVME

== See also ==
- List of defunct airlines of Italy
