= Agusta-Bell AB.102 =

1961 Italian utility helicopter

AB.102
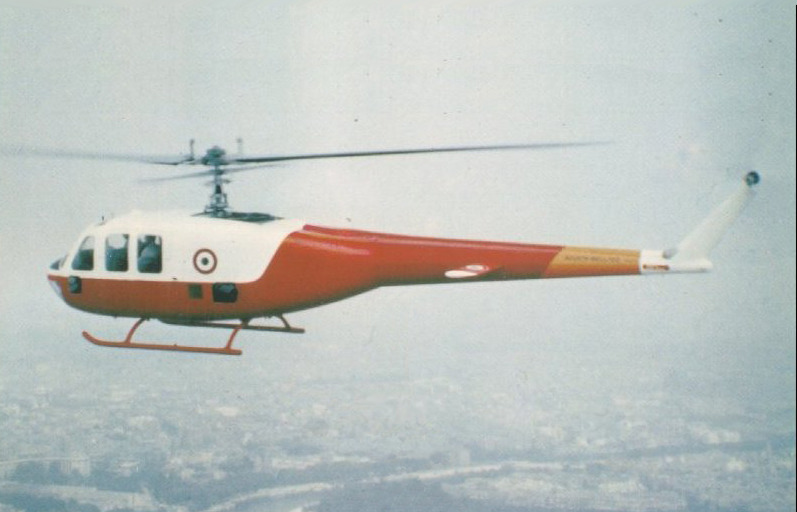

General information
- Type: Utility helicopter
- Manufacturer: Agusta
- Primary user: Elivie
- Number built: 3

History
- Introduction date: 1961
- First flight: 3 February 1959
- Developed from: Bell 48

The Agusta AB.102 was an Italian helicopter produced in small numbers in the early 1960s. The aircraft was based on the mechanical components of a Bell 48 that Agusta incorporated into an all-new, streamlined fuselage. The first flight was on 3 February 1959 and the prototype was exhibited at that year's Paris Air Show in faux military colours. Only two production examples were built, operated by Elivie in a regular air service between Turin and Milan from 1961. However, the advent of turbine-powered helicopters in the 1960s soon rendered the AB.102 obsolete.

== Operators ==
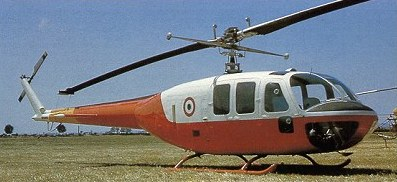

Italy

- Elivie
- Ministry of Defence

== Specifications ==
Data from Jane's All The World's Aircraft 1961–62

General characteristics

- Crew: 1
- Capacity:
  - 7–9 passengers or
  - 4 stretchers and 1 attendant or
  - 880 kg (1,940 lb) cargo
- Length: 12.73 m (41 ft 9 in) (fuselage length); Overall length 17.92 m (58 ft 10 in)
- Height: 3.23 m (10 ft 7 in)
- Empty weight: 1,810 kg (3,990 lb)
- Gross weight: 2,725 kg (6,008 lb)
- Max takeoff weight: 3,025 kg (6,669 lb)
- Powerplant: 1 × Pratt & Whitney R-1340-S1H4 radial engine, 450 kW (600 hp)
- Main rotor diameter: 14.50 m (47 ft 7 in)
- Main rotor area: 165.1 m^{2} (1,777 sq ft)

Performance

- Maximum speed: 174 km/h (108 mph, 94 kn) at sea level
- Cruise speed: 160 km/h (99 mph, 86 kn) at 600 m (1,970 ft) (best range speed)
- Range: 350 km (220 mi, 190 nmi) with 7 passengers and 115 kg (254 lb) baggage
- Endurance: 3 hr 20 min
- Service ceiling: 3,900 m (12,800 ft)
- Rate of climb: 5.6 m/s (1,100 ft/min)

== See also ==
Related development

- Bell 47
- Bell 48
