= TNCA MTW-1 =

MTW-1
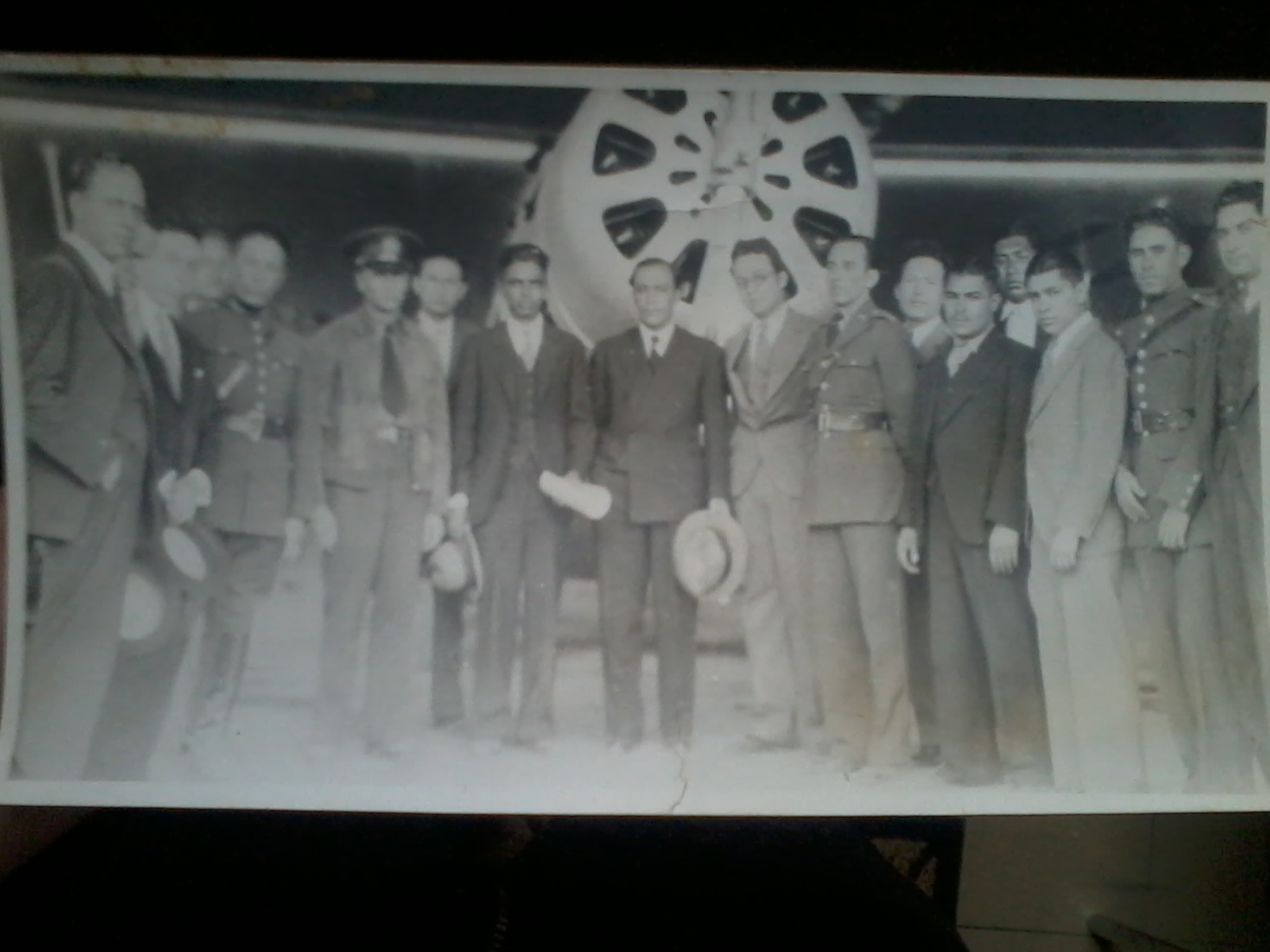

General information
- Type: long-range monoplane
- National origin: Mexico
- Manufacturer: TNCA
- Designer: Mikhail T. Watter
- Number built: 1

History
- First flight: June 28, 1934

The TNCA MTW-1 was a high-wing monoplane built by the TNCA (National Aeronautical Construction Workshops).

== Background ==
In 1933 the Spanish pilots Mariano Barberán and Joaquín Collar Serra made the Flight of the Cuatro Vientos, a nonstop flight between Seville (Spain) and Camagüey (Cuba) in a Breguet XIX GR Super-Bidón plane. After that trip they decided to continue towards Mexico City making a stop in Havana, however the plane disappeared near Villahermosa, Tabasco and after numerous searches among which the Mexican pilot Francisco Sarabia Tinoco participated with his airline "Transportes Aéreos de Chiapas", however the remains were not found.

Francisco Sarabia wanted to return the gesture to the Spanish pilots making a nonstop flight between Mexico and Spain in a nationally manufactured aircraft, for which he had the support of the Mexican government and TNCA.

== Design and development ==
To design the prototype, was used a design made by Dr. Mikhail T. Watter, a Russian engineer graduated from the Imperial Technical College of Moscow and the Polytechnic Institute of Kiev, who was invited to work in TNCA by General Azcárate. Factually, MTW-1 means the initials of the Russian engineer.

The design was a high-wing monoplane with two separate cabins and capacity for 5,000 liters of fuel and 284 liters of oil, because it was thought to be a "flying fuel tank" that could cover a distance of more than 8,000 kilometers, enough to make a flight from Mérida, Mexico and Seville, Spain.

The aircraft began to be built in October 1933 at the Talleres Nacionales de Construcciones Aeronáuticas (TNCA, National Aeronautical Construction Workshops) in Mexico City and it was completed in June 1934 with the registration XA-EXS, beginning on that month the tests on land where the landing gear was damaged. The aircraft was repaired and was able to make its first flight on June 28, 1934, however, on July 5 of the same year the landing gear was damaged again after landing at the Balbuena Airfield.

The plans for the Mexico-Spain flight were delayed because Francisco Sarabia claimed that he plane tended to get stuck, leaned heavily to the left and it was difficult to keep it stable, while the Russian engineer complained about the lack of experience and expertise of the Mexican pilot.

== End of the project ==
By October 1935, the Mexican government led by Lázaro Cárdenas takes possession of the wreckage of the aircraft, because government had contributed $60,000°° pesos ($16,700°° dollars of the time, about $320,000 °° current dollars) for construction of the aircraft. The airplane was kept secret for a long time, until it was dismantled in the TNCAs and its engine was used to be the powerplant of a Corsario Azcárate.

== Specifications (variant specified) ==
Data from Mexican military aviation history, airwar.ru

General characteristics

- Crew: 2
- Length: 9.85 m (32 ft 4 in)
- Wingspan: 16.68 m (54 ft 9 in)
- Height: 2.8 m (9 ft 2 in)
- Empty weight: 1,620 kg (3,571 lb)
- Max takeoff weight: 5,597 kg (12,339 lb)
- Fuel capacity: 5000 l
- Powerplant: 1 × Pratt & Whitney R-1340-16 Wasp Nine-cylinder single-row supercharged air-cooled radial engine, 410 kW (550 hp)

Performance

- Maximum speed: 270 km/h (170 mph, 150 kn)
- Cruise speed: 200 km/h (120 mph, 110 kn)
- Range: 11,600 km (7,200 mi, 6,300 nmi)
- Service ceiling: 6,096 m (20,000 ft)
