= Colonia Santa Lucía =

- Location within State of Mexico
- Coordinates: 19°46′25″N 99°1′20″W
- Country: Mexico
- State: Mexico
- Municipality: Zumpango
- Elevation: 2,240 m (7,350 ft)
- 3,610
- Time zone: UTC-6 (Central Standard Time)
  - Summer (DST): UTC-5 (Central Daylight Time)

Colonia Santa Lucía is a colonia, in the Santa Lucía town, east of the municipality of Zumpango, in the State of Mexico near the Mexico City Santa Lucía Airport.
