= Gabriel Śląsk =

Śląsk
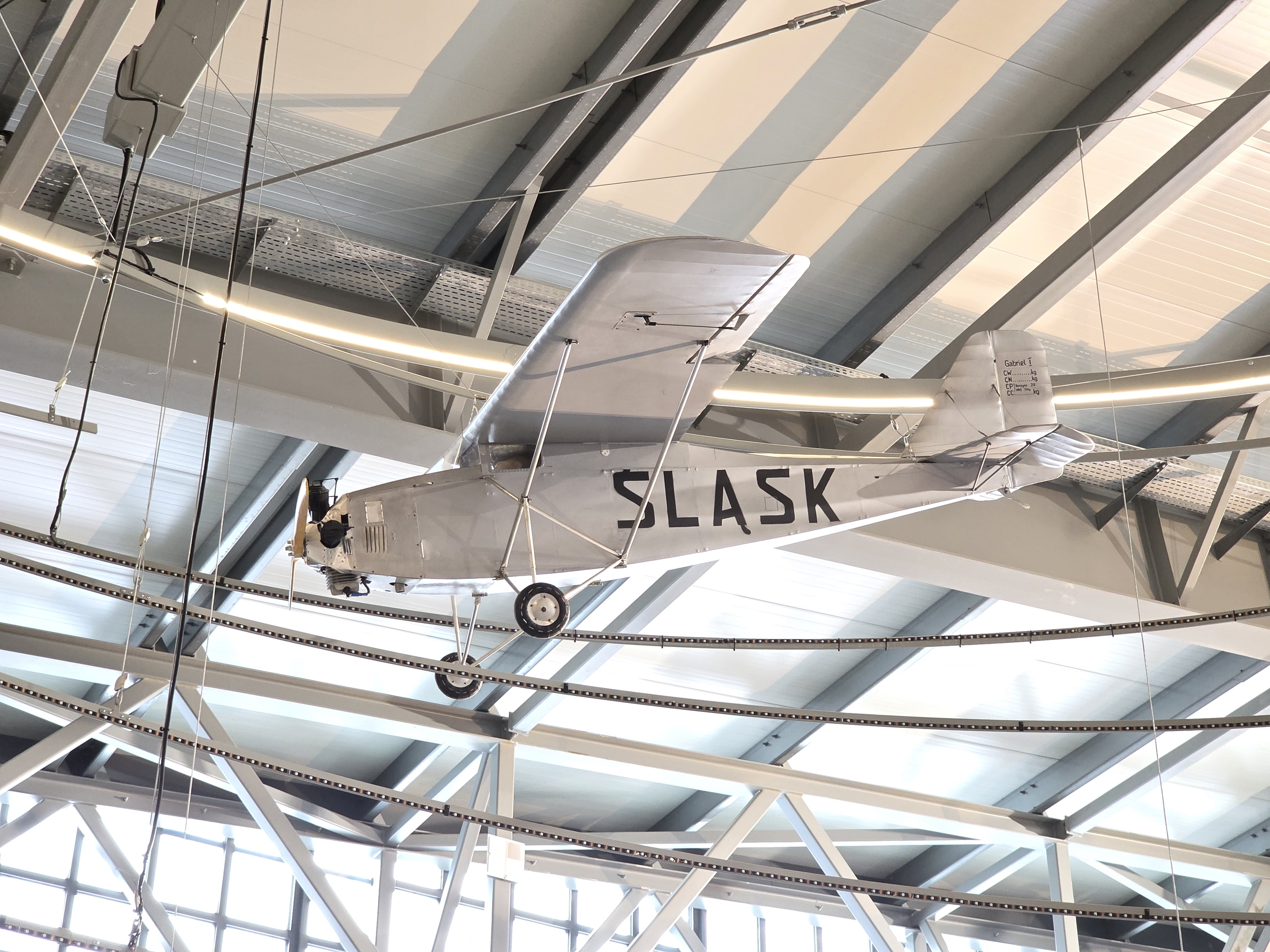

General information
- Type: Cabin single-seat light aircraft
- National origin: Poland
- Designer: Antoni Gabriel
- Status: officially grounded after two flights
- Number built: 1

History
- First flight: 11 October 1936

The Gabriel Śląsk (Silesia) was a Polish light aircraft designed and built by an amateur in the mid-1930s. After two flights the Polish authorities banned further development.

== Development ==
Antoni Gabriel, a long-time aircraft enthusiast, took an aircraft mechanic's course during military service and on return home designed a single-seat, high-wing, light, cabin monoplane. It was entirely self-funded and was constructed by Gabriel and a carpenter friend, Jan Mencel. Even the propeller and tyres were built on Gabriel's farm. He began tests with a car engine but this was not powerful enough even to taxi the machine, though he did get some press coverage which led to the offer of an old, 34 kW (45 hp) Anzani 6 radial engine. This powered the first flight on 11 October 1936; it was the first time Gabriel had flown any aircraft but the flight lasted 45 minutes and ended, as night fell, by bonfire-light. After repairing some undercarriage damage and installing another home-made propeller, the Śląsk made its second flight in December 1936. This proved to be its last, as the resulting publicity attracted official attention. Concerns about structural strength and lack of design documentation led to a ban on further flights.

Stored in a farm building, the Śląsk survived the war and parts survived until 1963.

== Design ==
Structurally, the Śląsk was a wooden aircraft. Its high wing was rectangular in plan out to blunted tips and had constant thickness over the whole span. The wing had a two-part, wooden structure with twin spars and was fabric covered. Constant chord ailerons reached out to the tips. There were parallel pairs of duralumin bracing struts on each side from the spars to the lower fuselage longerons.

The fuselage had a rectangular cross-section structure with wire cross-bracing. The Anzani engine was mounted with its cylinders projecting for cooling from an aluminium covered, tapered nose. Behind the engine the fuselage was fabric covered. Its depth was greatest under the wing, where the pilot's shallow-windowed, enclosed cabin under the leading edge was accessed by a hatch in its roof.

The Śląsk's fin was large and triangular and the narrow rudder broadened towards the keel. Its tailplane was mounted on top of the fuselage and braced from below with V-struts, carrying elevators with a gap for rudder movement. All empennage surfaces were fabric covered.

It had a fixed, conventional, tailwheel undercarriage of unusually wide track. The small mainwheels were mounted on wide-spread V-struts from the lower longerons at the meeting points with the wing bracing struts and near-vertical landing legs rose to the forward of these, stiffened by another strut to the base of the rear wing strut.

== Specifications ==
Data from Cynk

General characteristics

- Crew: One
- Length: 6.8 m (22 ft 4 in)
- Wingspan: 10 m (32 ft 10 in)
- Height: 1.9 m (6 ft 3 in)
- Wing area: 15 m^{2} (160 sq ft)
- Empty weight: 225 kg (496 lb)
- Gross weight: 350 kg (772 lb)
- Powerplant: 1 × Anzani 6 6-cylinder radial engine, 34 kW (45 hp)
- Propellers: 2-bladed wooden

Performance

- Maximum speed: 120 km/h (75 mph, 65 kn)
- Cruise speed: 80 km/h (50 mph, 43 kn)
- Range: 400 km (250 mi, 220 nmi)
- Landing speed: 60 kilometres per hour (37 mph; 32 kn)
