= Ireland Neptune =

Neptune
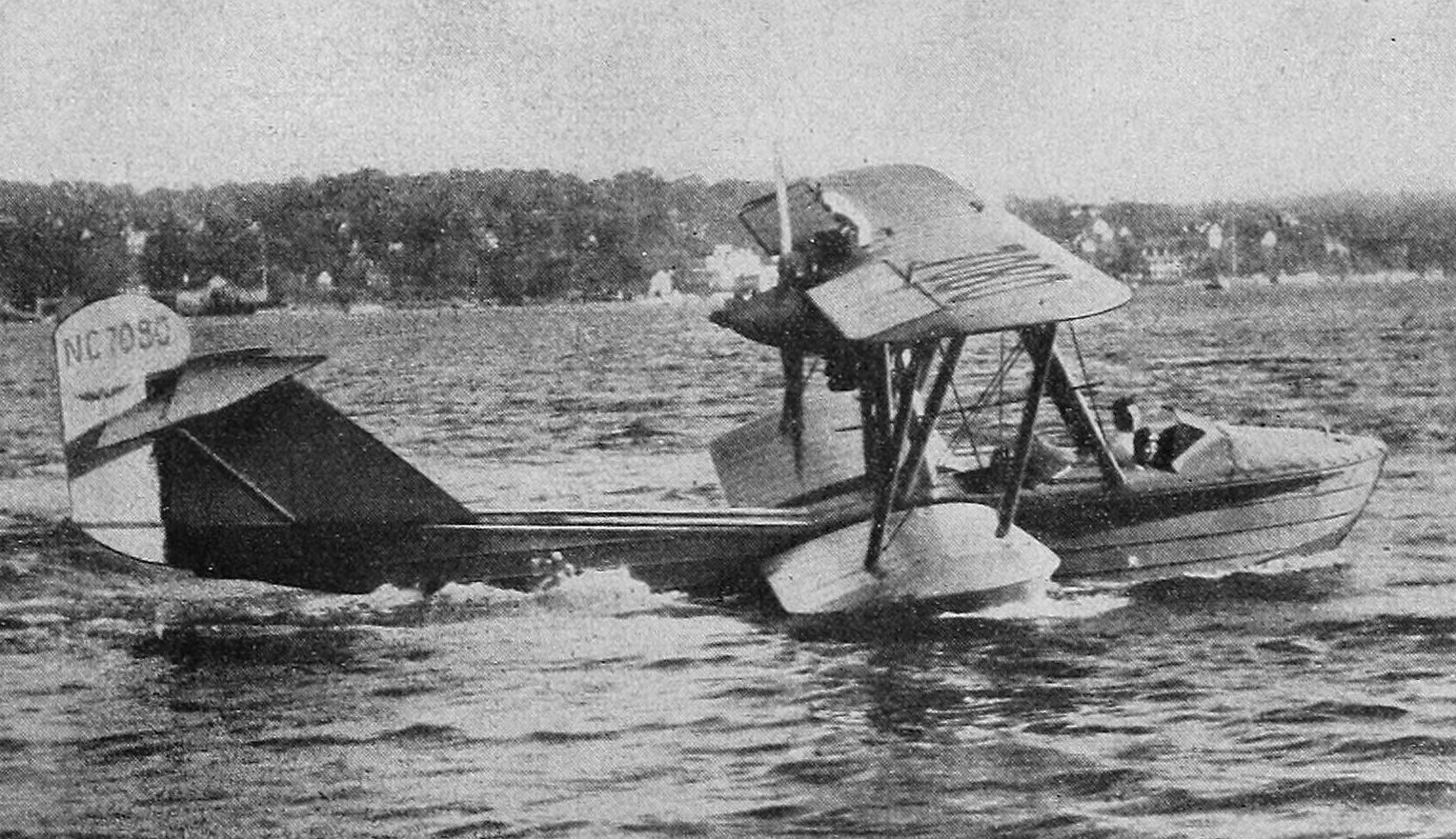
- first N-2B in 1928

General information
- Type: Four or five seat cabin flying boat biplane, some amphibious.
- National origin: United States
- Manufacturer: Ireland Aircraft (later renamed Amphibions, Inc)
- Number built: about 56

History
- First flight: 1927

The Ireland Neptune was a four or five place pusher configuration biplane sold in flying boat and amphibian versions. Designed in the U.S. and first flown in 1927, well over 50 were built.

== Design and development ==
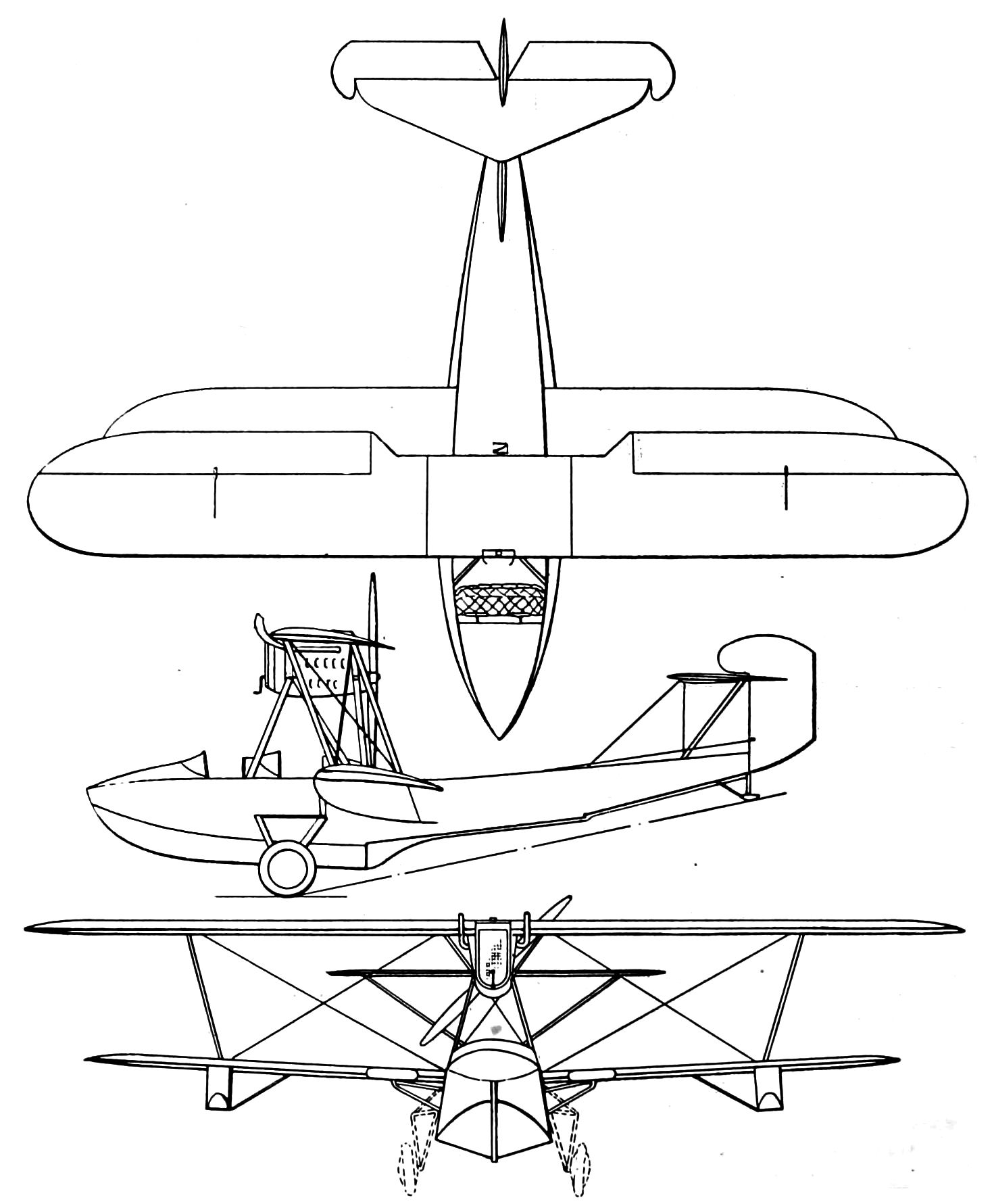
N-1B 3-view, with inline engine

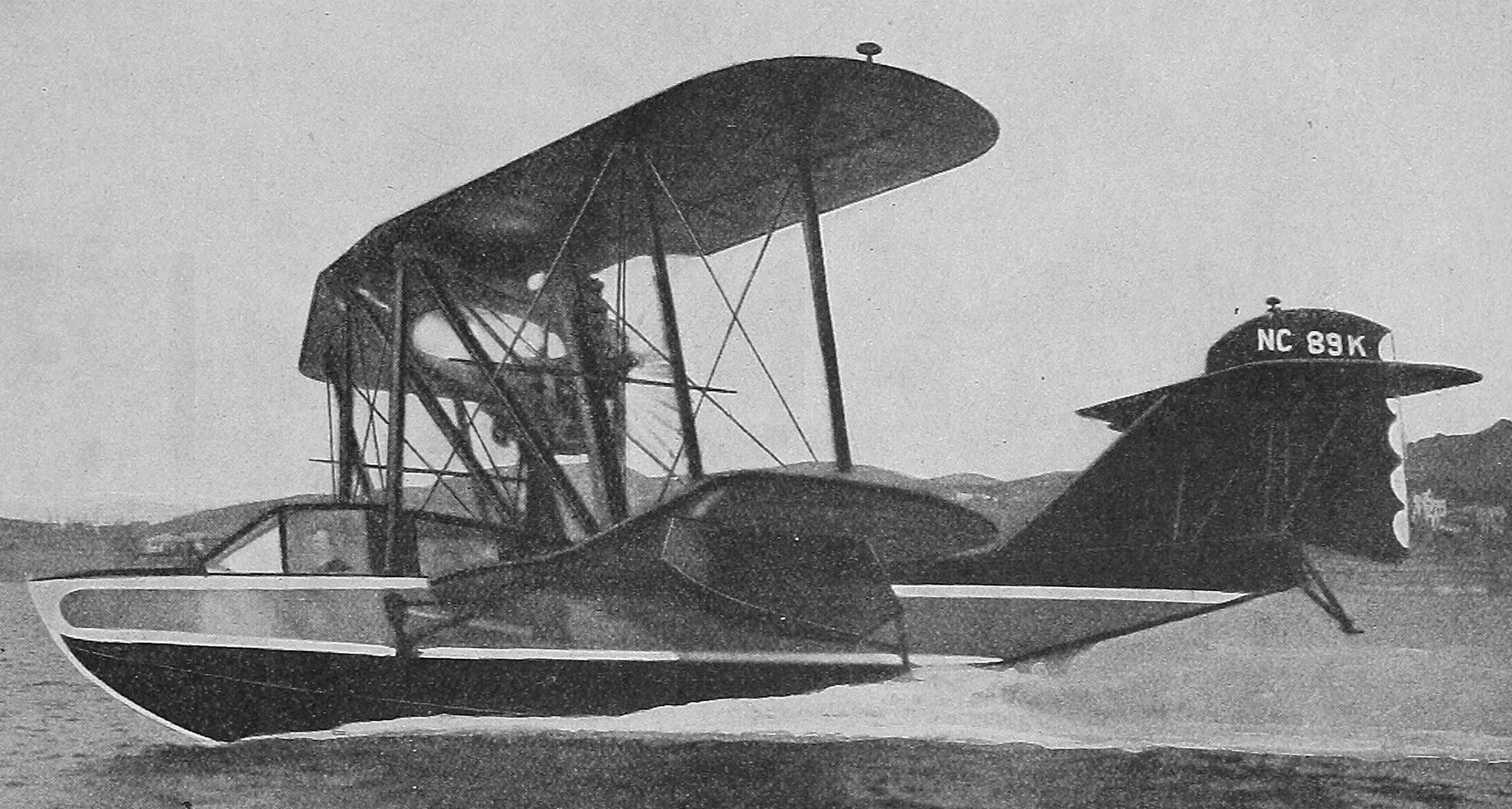
N-2C Neptune

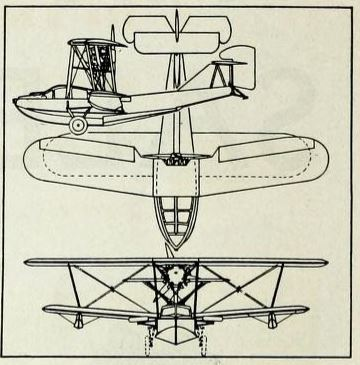
N-2C 3-view, showing swept wing and landing gear

The Neptune was a biplane with a single, pusher configuration engine mounted just under the upper wing and with a conventional hull. The 1927 type N-1B was initially advertised with engines in the 90–220 hp (67–164 kW) power rang and an early 3-view shows it with an inline engine, but it first flew in late 1927 with a 220 hp (160 kW) Wright J-5-C radial. About five more of this flying boat sub-type were built but, despite the 220 hp Wright, they were underpowered when loaded and so most were re-engined into N-2Bs.

This was also a flying boat. It had a 300 hp (220 kW) Wright J-6-9 but was otherwise similar to the N-1B. The N-2C which followed it into production was an amphibian and had a further 50% power increase from its heavier 450 hp (340 kW) Pratt & Whitney R-1340 Wasp. The power increase required a new, three-bladed propeller in place of the earlier, 8 ft (2.4 m), 2-bladed one used by the N1-B and it had a swept upper wing and a 1 ft (300 mm) increase of lower span.

The Neptune was an unequal span single bay biplane with its lower wing on top of the hull and close to the water but with a wide interplane gap. The lower wing had a span 85% of the upper and was significantly narrower, but only it carried dihedral. The wings were rectangular in plan out to rounded tips apart from a central cut-out in the upper trailing edge for propeller rotation. Frise-type, Alcad covered ailerons were fitted only on the upper wings. Both wings were built around spruce spars and were fabric covered and braced together by pairs of outward-leaning parallel interplane struts. The upper centre-section was mounted over the hull on a pair of sturdy N-form struts which were also the main engine supports. Leading edge sweep on the N2-C was about 7°.

The hull had a Cr/Mo steel tube structure which was Alcad clad. The planing bottom had a shallow V-section and a single step under the wing, though it ended abruptly mid-way between wing and tail. Stability on the water was provided by small floats mounted below the interplane struts. The first few N-2Bs had open cockpits but most had glazed cabins like that of the N-1B, as did the N-2C. Crew and passengers were accommodated in two rows of side-by-side seats with the pilot's seat, on the front row, well ahead of the upper leading edge. Entry was via upward-opening doors

Behind the wings the hull tapered to a conventional tail. Its fin was broad and tetrangular in profile, carrying a large balanced rudder. A small, near-rectangular tailplane was mounted on top of the fin, braced by inverted V-struts to the hull. The elevators were larger and balanced, separated by a cut-out for rudder movement. The tailplane was structurally similar to the wings but the other tail surfaces had metal frames. All were fabric-covered.

The amphibious N-2C had mainwheels on short oleo strut legs close to the hull sides with rear drag struts and an oleo tailskid at the extreme rear fuselage. Wheel retraction was manual and took about 30 seconds.

== Operational history ==
About 46 flying boats and 10 amphibians were completed, though histories are sparse. Two at least were used by Curtiss Flying Services, an air-taxi service, the first from mid-winter 1927-8 along the New England coast joined by another based in Florida a year later.

== Variants ==
Data from Aerofiles

N-1B Neptune
1927 four seat amphibian with a 9 cylinder 220 hp (160 kW) Wright J-5. About six built.
N-2B Neptune
1928 five seat (Note: Aero Digest (April 1931) describes this as a four-seater) flying boat with a 9 cylinder 300 hp (220 kW) Wright J-6-9. About 40 built.
N-2C Neptune
1929 five seat amphibian with a 9 cylinder 450 hp (340 kW) Wasp C. 10 built.
N-2D Neptune
1929 = 300hp Wright J-6 pusher.
ND-5
1929 - 5pCBAm; 450hp Wasp pusher.
ND-6
1929 - ND-5 with 300hp Wright J-6 pusher.

== Operators ==
Curtiss Flying Services

== Specifications (N-2C) ==
Data from Aero Digest, May 1931

General characteristics

- Crew: One
- Capacity: Three
- Length: 31 ft (9.4 m)
- Upper wingspan: 40 ft (12 m)
- Lower wingspan: 35 ft (11 m)
- Height: 12 ft 2.5 in (3.721 m)
- Wing area: 376 sq ft (34.9 m^{2})
- Airfoil: Curtiss C-72
- Empty weight: 3,240 lb (1,470 kg)
- Gross weight: 4,900 lb (2,223 kg)
- Fuel capacity: 85 US gal (71 imp gal; 320 L)
- Powerplant: 1 × Pratt & Whitney R-1340 Wasp (Wasp C) nine cylinder radial in pusher configuration, 425 hp (317 kW)
- Propellers: 3-bladed Hamilton-Standard

Performance

- Maximum speed: 120 mph (190 km/h, 100 kn)
- Cruise speed: 95 mph (153 km/h, 83 kn)
- Landing speed: 48 mph (77 km/h; 42 kn)
- Range: 380 mi (610 km, 330 nmi)
- Service ceiling: 16,000 ft (4,900 m)
- Rate of climb: 900 ft/min (4.6 m/s)
