= Azcárate O-E-1 =

O-E-1
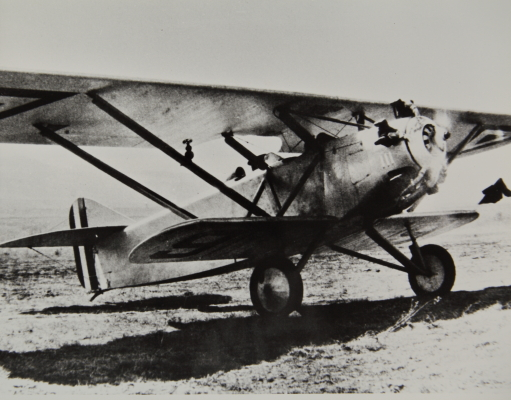
- E-1

General information
- Type: Reconnaissance bomber
- Manufacturer: TNCA
- Designer: Juan Azcárate
- Number built: 1

History
- First flight: 1928

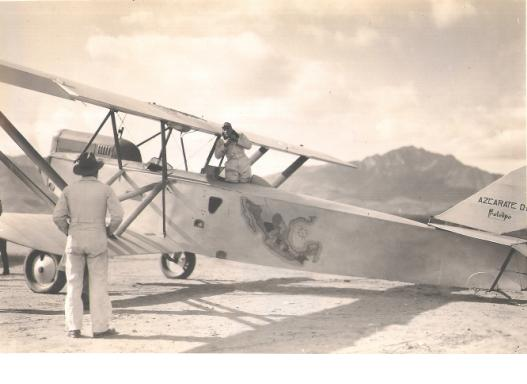
Gustavo León González on an Azcárate E-1

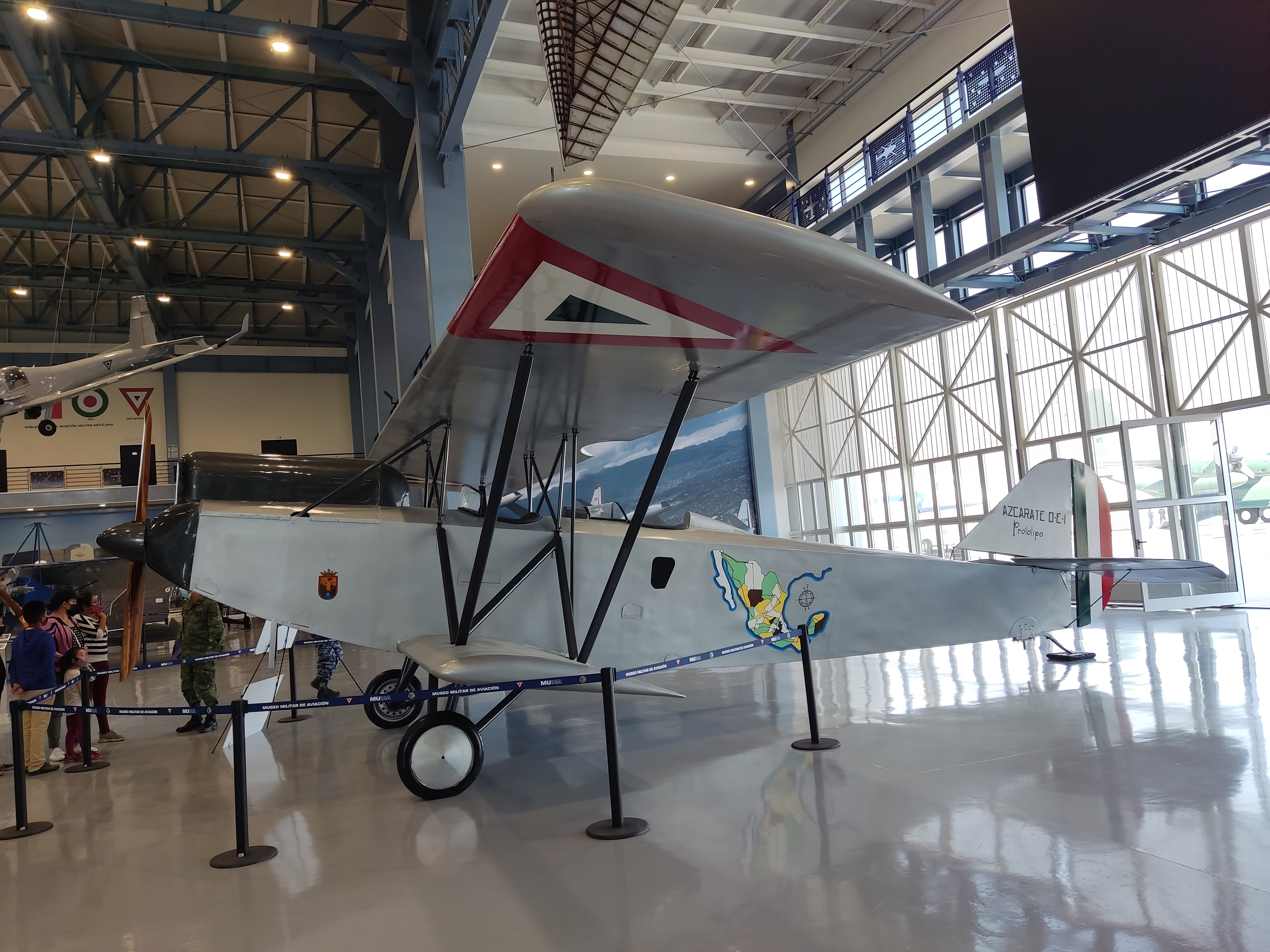
Azcárate O-E-1 at Mexican Air Force Museum.

The Azcárate O-E-1 was a reconnaissance-bomber aircraft developed in Mexico in the late 1920s. It was designed by General Brigadier Juan Francisco Azcárate and built at the TNCA workshops near Mexico City. A trainer version, the Azcárate E-1 (for Escuela) was also built. It was a sesquiplane of conventional configuration with tailskid undercarriage, and seating the crew in tandem, open cockpits. The types are sometimes collectively referred to simply as the "Azcárate sesquiplane" (sesquiplano in Spanish).

On 30 September 1928, pilot Gustavo León and Subteniente and mechanic Ricardo González set out on an aerial circumnavigation of Mexico in an O-E-1. Conducted in 58 legs, they completed their 10,986 km (6,826 mi) flight on 18 December.

== Specifications (E-1) ==
General characteristics

- Crew: two, pilot and instructor
- Length: 6.8 m (22 ft 4 in)
- Wingspan: 10.50 m (34 ft 6 in)
- Height: 2.57 m (8 ft 3 in)
- Wing area: 23.5 m^{2} (253 sq ft)
- Empty weight: 666 kg (1,465 lb)
- Powerplant: 1 × Wright J-5 radial engine , 112 kW (150 hp)

Performance

- Maximum speed: 165 km/h (103 mph, 90 kn)
- Endurance: 4 hours
- Service ceiling: 4,500 m (14,760 ft)
