= Mexican Air Force Museum =

Air force museum

- Museo Militar de Aviación "Teniente Piloto Aviador José Espinoza Fuentes" (MUMA)
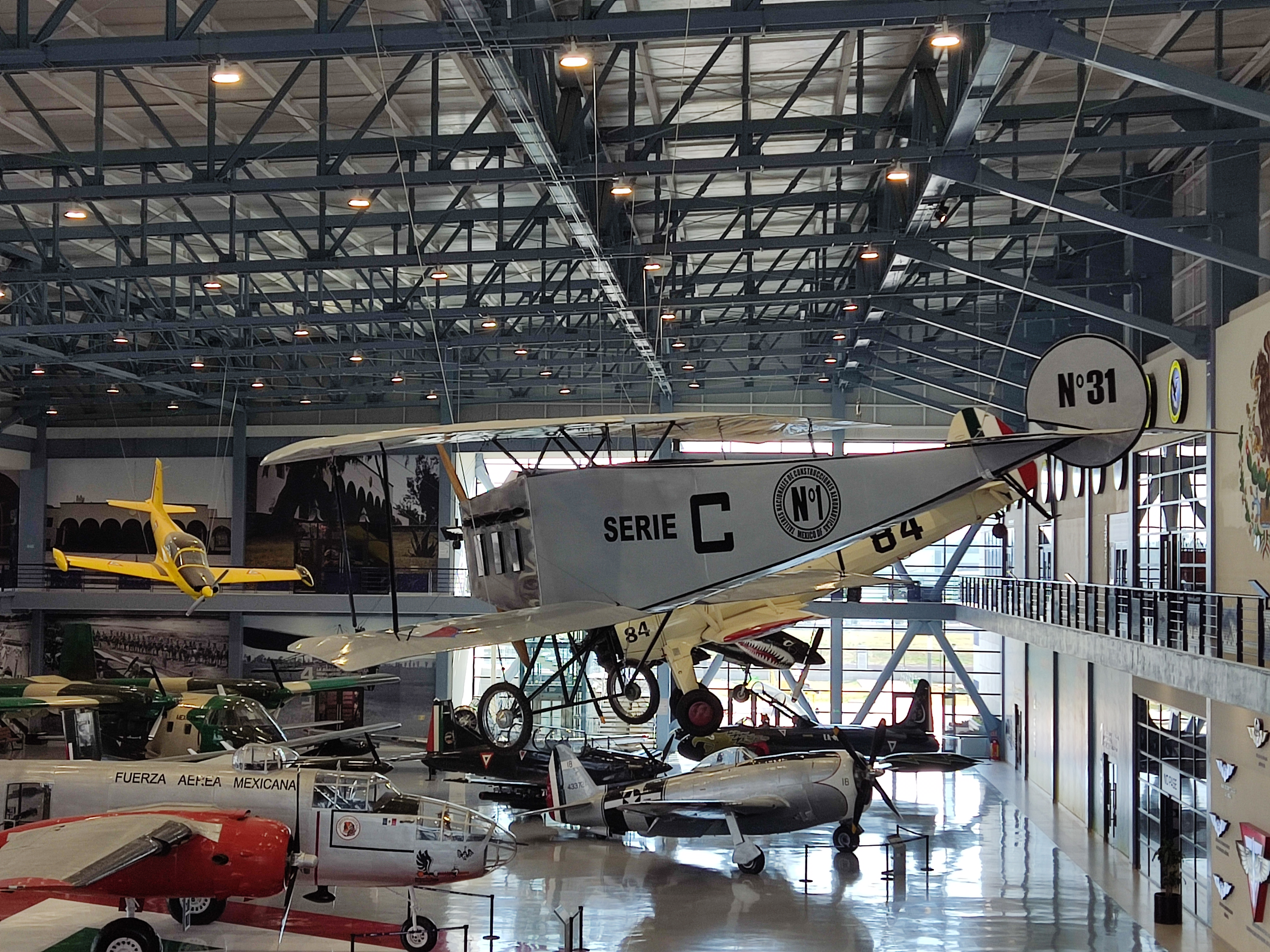
- Established: 10 February 2022
- Location: Santa Lucía
- Coordinates: 19.7427°N 98.9869°W
- Type: Aerospace
- Owner: SEDENA
- Website: https://www.gob.mx/sedena/acciones-y-programas/atencion-al-publico-museo-militar-de-aviacion-b-a-m-no-1-sta-lucia-edo-mex

The Military Aviation Museum (Spanish: Museo Militar de Aviación "Teniente Piloto Aviador José Espinoza Fuentes") is located in the facilities of the Santa Lucía Air Base, State of Mexico, it is dependent on the Secretary of National Defense and focuses mainly on the exhibition of historical material of the Mexican Air Force.

== History ==
The first military aviation museum was created in 1933 on the land where the Eastern Passenger Bus Terminal is currently located. This museum served from 1933 to 1976, the year in which it was demolished to start the construction of the bus station. Since 2000, a part of the hangar used by the 302 Air Squadron was used for the exhibition of historical aerial material and which was reopened in 2010 for the celebration of the bicentennial of Mexican Independence and the centennial of the Mexican Revolution.

Due to the construction of the AIFA, the building was relocated, beginning its construction in October 2020 and being inaugurated on February 10, 2022, on the 107th anniversary of the FAM. Along with this museum, the Mammoth Museum was also inaugurated, whose facilities are located a few meters from the MUMA.

== Facilities ==
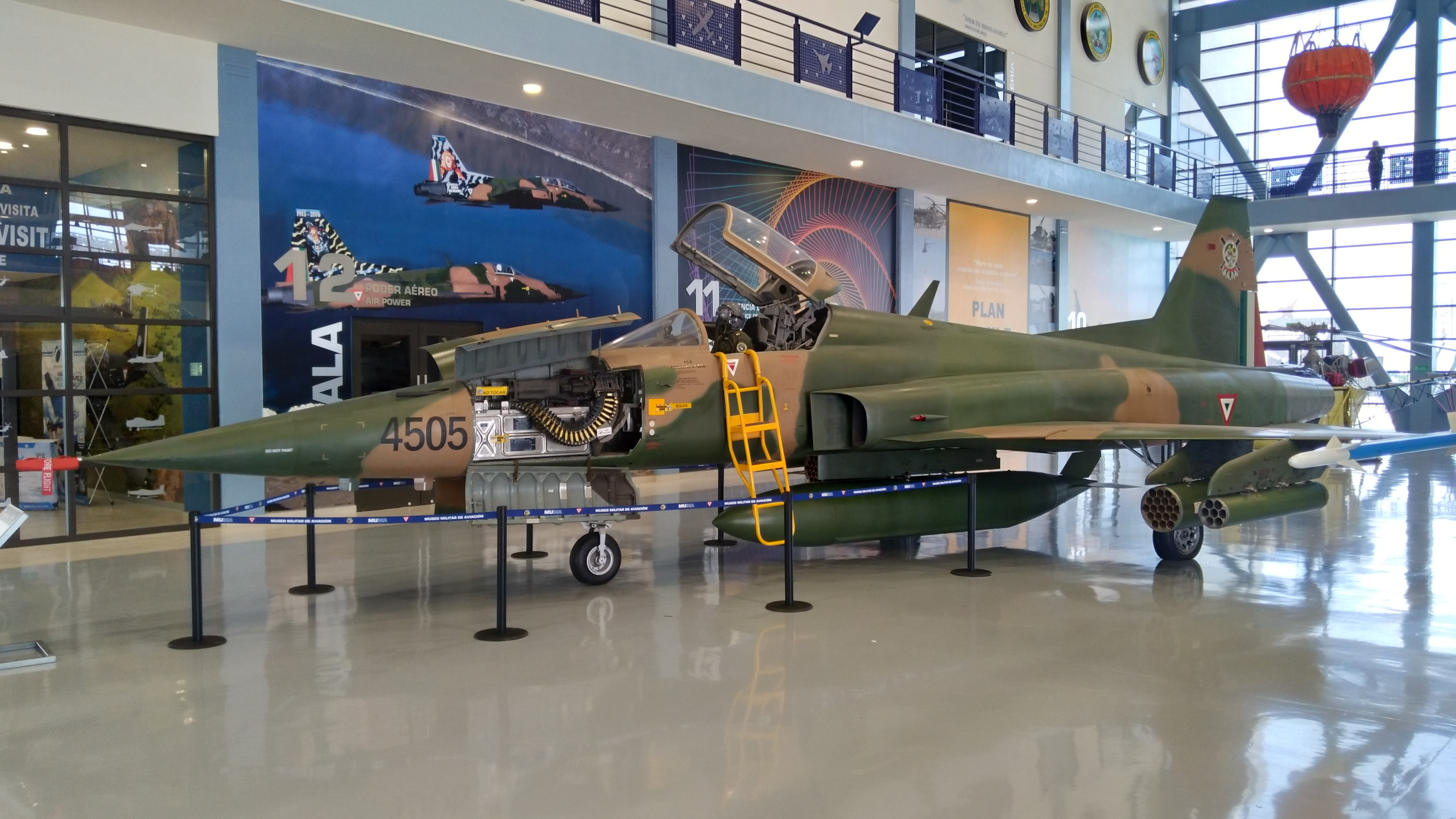
Northrop F-5E Tiger II

The museum has 12 exhibition rooms and 24 galleries, as well as a control tower simulator, cafeteria, souvenir shop and 50 aircraft on display inside and outside the building, highlighting domestically manufactured aircraft such as the Pinocchio Plane, Azcárate O-E-1, LASA-60, TNCA Serie H, TNCA Series C, and the AAMSA A9B-M Quail "Naco"; Also on display is a P-47 Thunderbolt from 201 Squadron that served in World War II; a DC-3 nicknamed "El Mexicano" which was Mexico's first presidential plane; a Mil Mi-26, which was the largest helicopter operated by the FAM, a fully armed F-5, among other aircraft.

== See also ==
- List of aviation museums
