= TNCA =

The Talleres Nacionales de Construcciones Aeronáuticas (TNCA) (national aviation workshops) was an aircraft manufacturer established outside Mexico City in 1915. TNCA closed in 1930, was briefly revived in 1941 under the name Talleres Generales de Aeronáutica (TGA) and again in 1947.

The main designers were Brigadier General and engineer Juan Francisco Azcárate, and Italian engineer Francisco Santarini, who manufactured a variety of domestically-designed military aircraft, propellers and engines.

== Aircraft ==
- TNCA Series A - biplane.
- TNCA Serie B
- TNCA Series C- biplane, powered by a Hispano-Suiza engine. Also called Microplano Veloz and Microbio.
- TNCA Serie D derived from the Bleriot and Morane-Saulnier aircraft.
- TNCA Serie E - biplane.
- TNCA Serie F derived from the Bleriot and Morane-Saulnier aircraft.
- TNCA Serie G derived from the Bleriot and Morane-Saulnier aircraft.
- TNCA Serie H - bomber, monoplane, high wing, double control.
- TNCA MTW-1
- TNCA TTS-5
- TNCA O-E-1 Azcárate
- Sea Teziutlán
- Avro 504 - built under license and called Avro Anáhuac.
- O2U-4A Corsair - built under license and named Corsario Azcárate.

== Other vehicles ==
- TNCA Salinas Tank
- Caloca Hovercraft

== Engines ==
Aztatl
The first aircraft engine manufactured in Mexico starting on 1917. The engine was an air-cooled radial and was built in versions of three, six (80 hp) and ten cylinders.

SS México
National design and manufacture.

Trébol
A three-cylinder, 45 hp engine.

Anzani, Gnome and Hispano-Suiza
Built by TNCA in Mexico under licence.

Some TNCA aircraft were powered by Wright and Renault engines. TNCA engineers also designed and produced the high performance Anáhuac Propeller, later copied by several countries.
