= Pratt & Whitney R-1340 Wasp =

Aircraft engine family by Pratt & Whitney

R-1340 Wasp
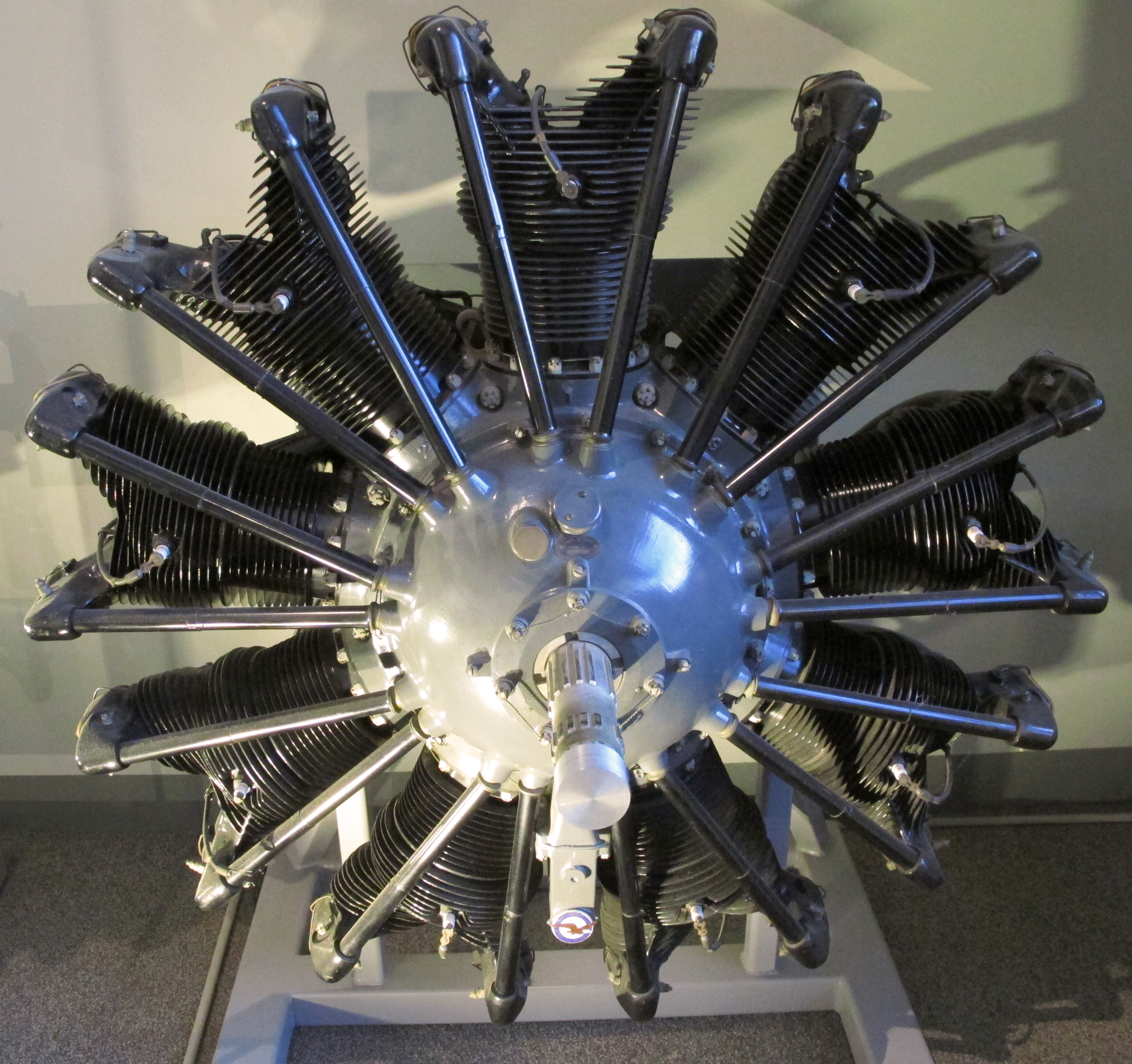
- The first Pratt & Whitney Wasp
- Type: Radial engine
- National origin: United States
- Manufacturer: Pratt & Whitney
- First run: 29 December 1925
- Major applications: Soko 522; Boeing P-26 Peashooter; de Havilland Canada DHC-3 Otter; North American T-6 Texan; Sikorsky H-19; Junkers Ju 52
- Manufactured: 1926–1960
- Number built: 34,966
- Developed into: Pratt & Whitney R-985 Wasp Junior

The Pratt & Whitney R-1340 Wasp is an aircraft engine of the reciprocating type that was widely used in American aircraft from the 1920s onward. It was the Pratt & Whitney aircraft company's first engine, and the first of the famed Wasp series. It was a single-row, nine-cylinder, air-cooled, radial design, and displaced 1,344 cubic inches (22 L); bore and stroke were both 5.75 in (146 mm). A total of 34,966 engines were produced.

As well as numerous types of fixed-wing aircraft, it was used to power helicopters, the Agusta-Bell AB.102 and the Sikorsky H-19, and a class of airship, the K-class blimp.

In 2016, it received designation as a Historic Engineering Landmark from the American Society of Mechanical Engineers.

== Variants ==
Note: R for Radial and 1340 for 1340 cubic inch displacement.

R-1340-7
450 hp (340 kW), 600 hp (450 kW)
R-1340-8
425 hp (317 kW)
R-1340-9
450 hp (340 kW), 525 hp (391 kW)
R-1340-16
550 hp (410 kW)
R-1340-17
525 hp (391 kW)
R-1340-19
600 hp (450 kW)
R-1340-19F
600 hp (450 kW)
R-1340-21G
550 hp (410 kW)
R-1340-22
550 hp (410 kW)
R-1340-23
575 hp (429 kW)
R-1340-30
550 hp (410 kW)
R-1340-31
550 hp (410 kW)

R-1340-33
600 hp (450 kW)
R-1340-48
600 hp (450 kW)
R-1340-49
600 hp (450 kW)
R-1340-AN1
550 hp (410 kW), 600 hp (450 kW)
R-1340-AN2
550 hp (410 kW), 3:2 geared prop shaft
R-1340-B
450 hp (340 kW)
R-1340-D
500 hp (370 kW)
R-1340-S1D1
525 hp (391 kW)
R-1340-S1H1-G
550 hp (410 kW), 600 hp (450 kW)
R-1340-S3H1
600 hp (450 kW)
R-1340-T1D1
520 hp (390 kW)

== Applications ==
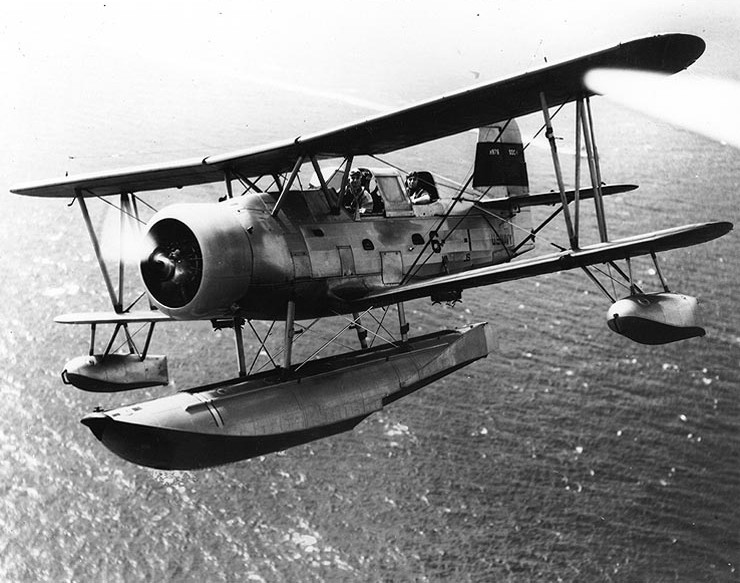
R-1340 powered Curtiss SOC Seagull, 1939

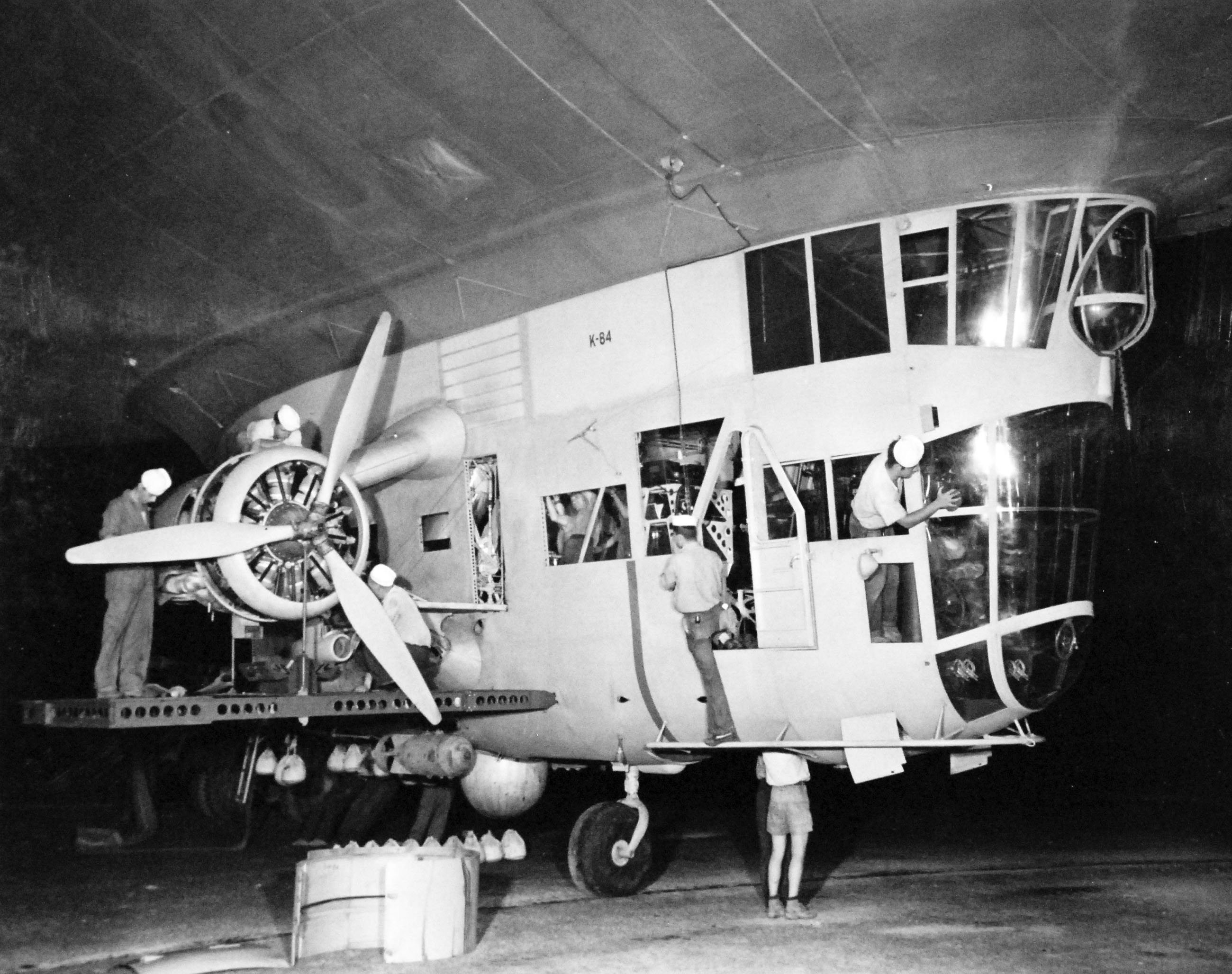
The gondola of a US Navy K-class blimp. One of its two R-1340 engines is being serviced, 1943

- Agusta-Bell AB.102
- Air Tractor AT-301
- Air Tractor AT-401
- Ayres Thrush
- Bach Air Yacht
- Boeing 247
- Boeing F3B
- Boeing F4B
- Boeing Model 40A
- Boeing P-12
- Boeing P-26 Peashooter
- Boeing P-29
- CAC Ceres
- CAC Wirraway
- Curtiss F7C Seahawk
- Curtiss Falcon
- Curtiss O-52
- Curtiss P-6S Hawk
- Curtiss SOC Seagull
- de Havilland Canada DHC-3 Otter
- Douglas Dolphin
- Fairchild FB-3
- Fokker F.10
- Fokker F.32
- Ford Trimotor
- Gee Bee QED
- Gee Bee R 1/2 Super Sportster
- Gee Bee R-1
- Gee Bee R-2 Super Sportster
- Gee Bee YW
- Gee Bee Z
- Goodyear K-class blimp
- Grumman Ag Cat
- Grumman Mallard
- Howard DGA-6
- Ireland N-2C Neptune
- Junkers Ju 52
- Junkers W 34
- Kaman HH-43 Huskie
- Knoll KN-3
- Lockheed Model 8 Sirius
- Lockheed Model 9 Orion
- Lockheed Model 10-C & 10-E Electra
- Lockheed Vega 5
- Lockheed XC-35
- Loening OL-8
- Noorduyn Norseman
- Norsk Flyindustri Finnmark 5A
- North American BC-1
- North American T-6/SNJ Texan/Harvard
- Northrop Alpha
- Northrop C-19 Alpha
- Scottish Aviation Twin Pioneer
- Sikorsky H-19
- Sikorsky S-38
- Soko 522
- Thomas-Morse XP-13A Viper
- TNCA MTW-1
- Vought O2U Corsair
- Wedell-Williams Model 45
- Westland Whirlwind (helicopter)

== Engines on display ==
- There are a Wasp A and three Wasp C's on display at the New England Air Museum in Windsor Locks, Connecticut.

== Specifications (R-1340-S1H1-G) ==
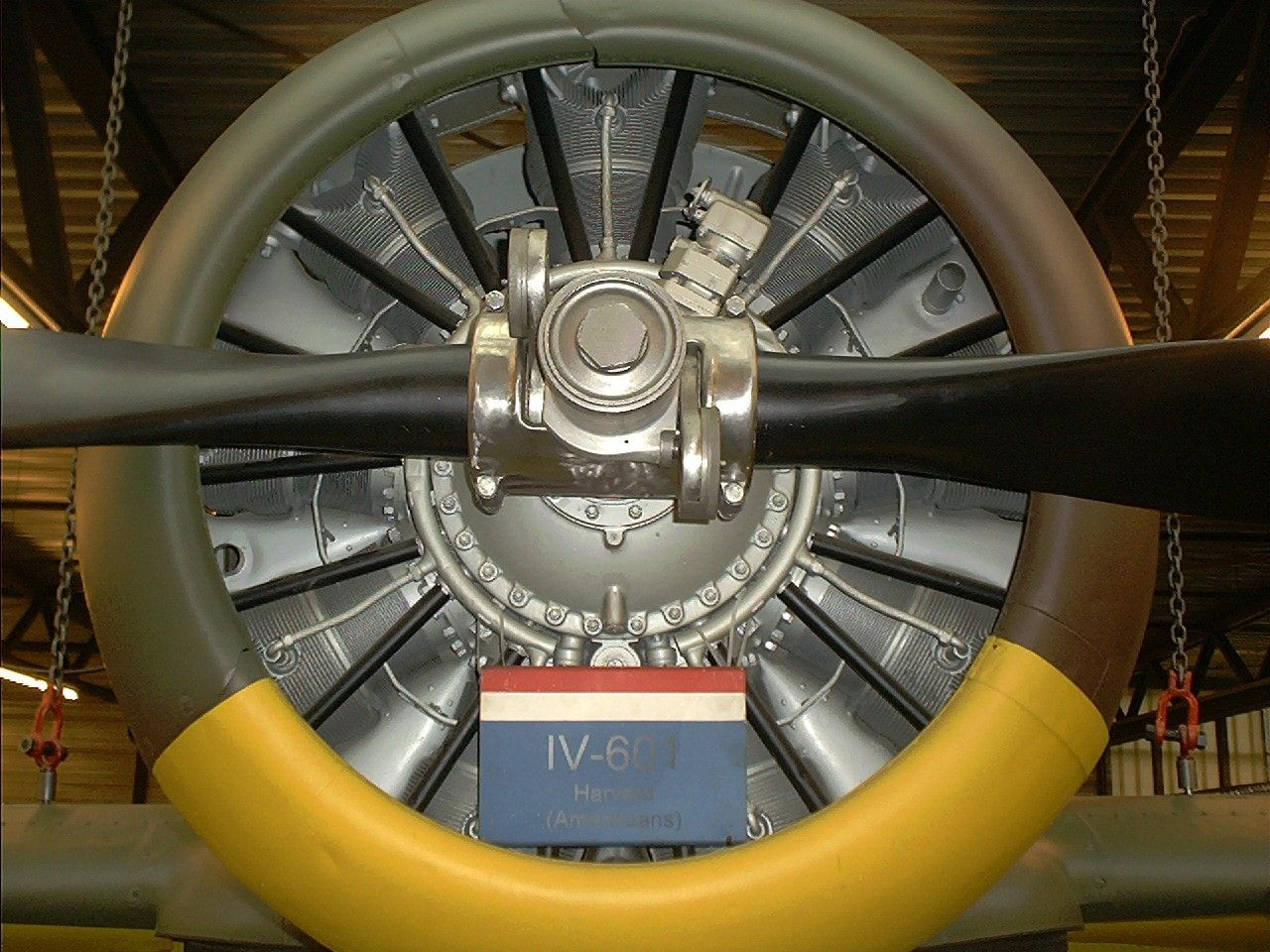
Pratt & Whitney R-1340 installed in a T-6 Texan

Data from Jane's.

=== General characteristics ===
- Type: Nine-cylinder single-row supercharged air-cooled radial engine
- Bore: 5.75 in (146 mm)
- Stroke: 5.75 in (146 mm)
- Displacement: 1,344 cu in (22.02 L)
- Length: 47.7 in (1,210 mm)
- Diameter: 51.75 in (1,314 mm)
- Dry weight: 930 lb (420 kg)

=== Components ===
- Valvetrain: Two overhead valves per cylinder
- Supercharger: Single-speed centrifugal type supercharger, 1:10 step-up
- Fuel system: Two-barrel Stromberg carburetor
- Fuel type: 91 octane rating gasoline
- Cooling system: Air-cooled
- Reduction gear: 3:2

=== Performance ===
- Power output: 600 hp (450 kW) at 2,250 rpm at 6,200 ft (1,900 m)
- Specific power: 0.45 hp/cu in (20.5 kW/L)
- Compression ratio: 6:1
- Power-to-weight ratio: 0.65 hp/lb (1.07 kW/kg)

== See also ==
- Pratt & Whitney Wasp series
- Pratt & Whitney R-1690 Hornet

Related development

- Pratt & Whitney R-985 Wasp Junior
- Pratt & Whitney R-1535 Twin Wasp Junior
- Pratt & Whitney R-1830 Twin Wasp

Related lists

- List of aircraft engines
