= TNCA Series C =

Series C Microplano
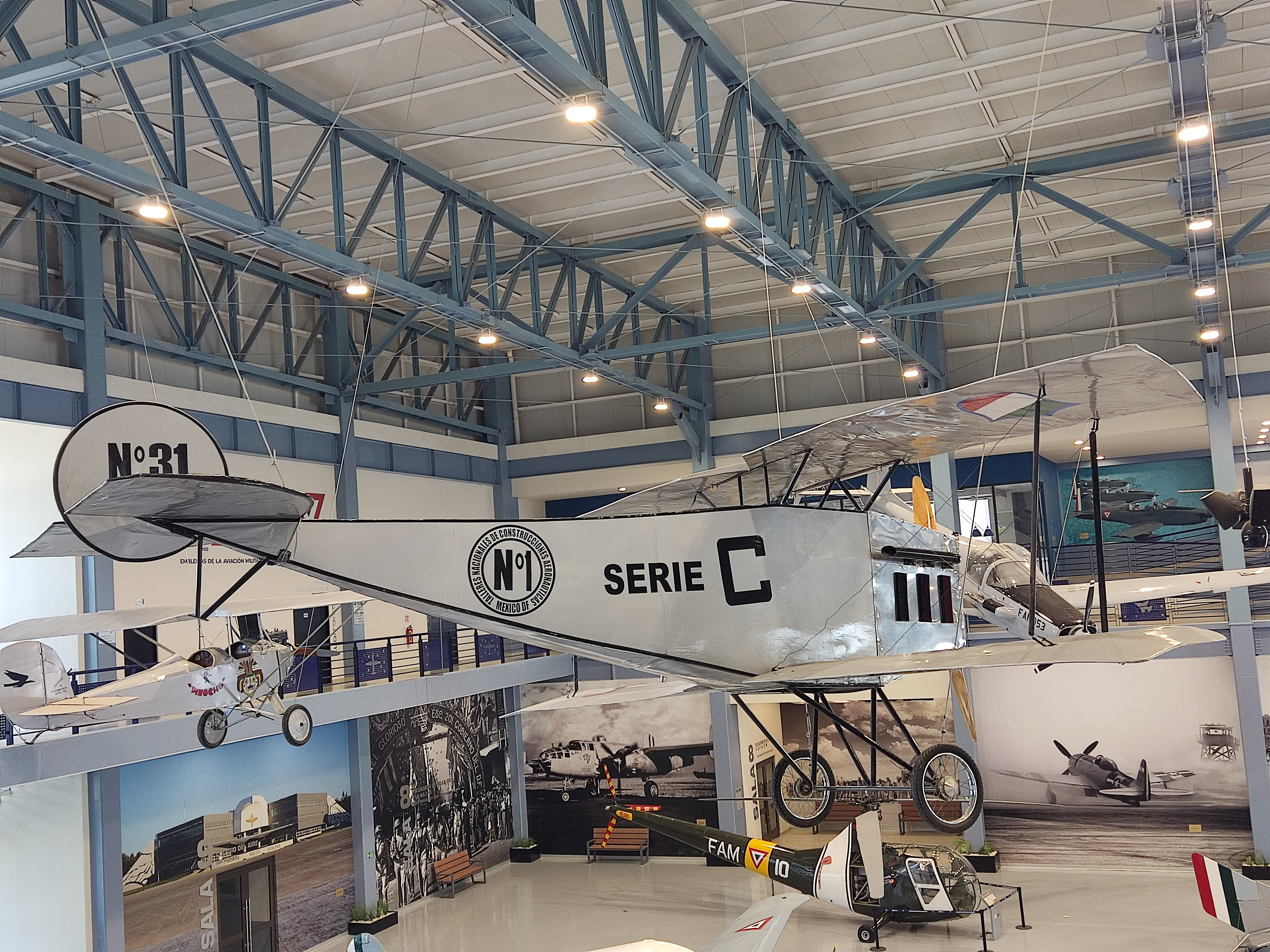
- TNCA Serie C in Museo Militar de Aviación

General information
- Type: Single-seat fighter
- National origin: Mexico
- Manufacturer: Talleres Nacionales de Construcciones Aeronáuticas (TNCA)
- Designer: Guillermo Villasana and Francisco Santarini

History
- First flight: c. February 1918

The TNCA Series C Microplano was a single-engine, single-seat fighter designed and built in Mexico during World War I.

== Design ==
From 1915 the Talleres Nacionales de Construcciones Aeronáuticas - (National Aeronautical Construction Workshops), sometimes known as the Military Aviation Factory, produced several series of Mexican aircraft. Some of these were based on European designs but others were indigenous. Pressure for local designs and production was increased by the concentration of European manufacturers on war production, in addition to the tensions between Mexico and the United States. In 1917 rights to build Spanish Hispano-Suiza engines was acquired and a factory established.

The Series C Microplano was an unequal span single bay biplane, with wings without sweep or stagger connected by pairs of vertical, parallel interplane struts on each side, the forward ones a little closer to the fuselage. Both wings had constant chord and squared tips. There was a triangular cut-out in the trailing edge of the upper wing to improve the pilot's view.

The Microplano had a flat sided, rectangular section fuselage. The nose housed a 115 kW (157 hp) Hispano-Suiza water-cooled engine, driving a two bladed propeller. Behind the underwing single seat open cockpit the fuselage narrowed strongly in both height and width. Both the near circular rudder and semi-circular tailplane were all-moving. There was a fixed conventional undercarriage with mainwheels on V-form struts, assisted by a tailskid.

== Specifications ==
Data from Jane's Fighting Aircraft of World War I

General characteristics

- Crew: One
- Length: 6.60 m (21 ft 8 in)
- Upper wingspan: 8.00 m (26 ft 3 in)
- Lower wingspan: 6.88 m (22 ft 7 in)
- Height: 2.55 m (8 ft 4 in) maximum
- Wing area: 18 m^{2} (190 sq ft)
- Empty weight: 460 kg (1,014 lb)
- Gross weight: 650 kg (1,433 lb)
- Powerplant: 1 × Hispano-Suiza water-cooled, 112 kW (150 hp) - 119 kW (160 hp)
- Propellers: 2-bladed Anahuac

Performance

- Maximum speed: 190 km/h (120 mph, 100 kn) to 220 km/h (137 mph; 119 kn)
