= Santa Lucía, Zumpango =

Santa Lucía
- Location within State of Mexico
- Coordinates: 19°44′53″N 98°58′57″W
- Country: Mexico
- State: Mexico
- Municipality: Zumpango
- Elevation: 2,249 m (7,379 ft)

Population (2010)
  - Total: 3,639
- Time zone: UTC-6 (Central Standard Time)
  - Summer (DST): UTC-5 (Central Daylight Time)

Santa Lucía is a town located in the State of Mexico in Mexico. It belongs to the municipality of Zumpango, being located at its southeast end, within the facilities of the Felipe Ángeles International Airport.

== See also ==
- Colonia Santa Lucía, a neighborhood in the town.
