= Juan Francisco Azcárate =

Mexican military officer and diplomat

Brigadier General Engineer Juan Francisco Azcárate Pino (December 8, 1896 – June 2, 1987) was an officer in the Mexican military, a diplomat, and a designer of military aircraft.

As chief of the department of aviation, Azcárate oversaw the manufacture of military aircraft of his own design at the National Aviation Workshops. He was later appointed military attaché to the Mexican embassy in the United States, and during World War II was minister of the Mexican embassy in Germany. His published works include Un Programa Político Internacional (1932), Esencia de la Revolución, (1966) and Trilogía Moderna Contemporánea (1978).
