= TNCA Serie A =

TNCA Serie A "Biplano"

General information
- Type: Biplane
- National origin: Mexico
- Manufacturer: TNCA
- Designer: Francisco Santarini Tognoli
- Status: Retired
- Primary user: Mexican Air Force
- Number built: 28

History
- First flight: May 16, 1917

TNCA Series A was a utility biplane made in Mexico by Talleres Nacionales de Construcciones Aeronáuticas (TNCA).

== Design and development ==
The first Series A prototype was the result of a Morane-Moisant monoplane being converted to a biplane by engineer Francisco Santarini. This prototype made its first flight on 20 November 1916. The second prototype was similar and had a French Anzani 6-cylinder engine.

The third prototype was the first aircraft that was fully built in Mexico, powered by a 60 hp (45 kW) TNCA Aztatl engine driving an Anahuac propeller and first flown on 16 May 1917, marking the start of serial production. Mexican President Venustiano Carranza presented two examples to El Salvador, one of which was used as a source of spare parts.

== Operational history ==
On 6 July 1917, the first airmail flight was inaugurated in Mexico, flown by a TNCA Series A. The aircraft was dispatched two days before by train to the city of Pachuca, where it was loaded with a suitcase containing 534 letters and 67 postcards. The aircraft took off from Pachuca, piloted by Lieutenant Colonel Horacio Ruiz Gaviño, who flew to Mexico City following the railroad tracks, landing at Balbuena Field. The 76 km (47 mi) flight was made in 57 minutes.

The TNCA Series A was also used for several "firsts"; the first cinematic filming from an aircraft in Mexico, with Gaviño at the controls; the first aerobatics in Mexico; the first night flight in Mexico; first flight of a seaplane at the port of Veracruz, when floats were fitted to the aircraft.

On 3 November 1918, the TNCA Series A with registration 28-A-43, piloted by Lieutenant Amado Paniagua crashed on the North Beach of Veracruz, while performing an Immelmann turn during an air show, killing the pilot. He was the first person killed in an aircraft crash in Mexico.

== Specifications (TNCA Series A) ==
Data from flyingmachines.ru : TNCA Series A, airwar.ru : TNCA Series A

General characteristics

- Crew: one
- Capacity: one passenger
- Length: 7.2 m (23 ft 7 in)
- Wingspan: 10.15 m (33 ft 4 in)
- Height: 3.09 m (10 ft 2 in)
- Wing area: 35.2 m^{2} (379 sq ft)
- Max takeoff weight: 520 kg (1,146 lb)
- Powerplant: 1 × TNCA Aztatl 6-cylinder air-cooled radial piston engine, 45 kW (60 hp)
- Propellers: 2-bladed Anáhuac fixed-pitch propeller

Performance

- Maximum speed: 129 km/h (80 mph, 70 kn)
- Cruise speed: 105 km/h (65 mph, 57 kn)
