= Federal Aircraft Works =

- Industry: Aviation
- Founded: 1925; 101 years ago
- Founder: F.J. Ditter
- Headquarters: Minneapolis, Minnesota, United States

The Federal Aircraft Works was an American manufacturer of aircraft skis located in Minneapolis, Minnesota.

== History ==
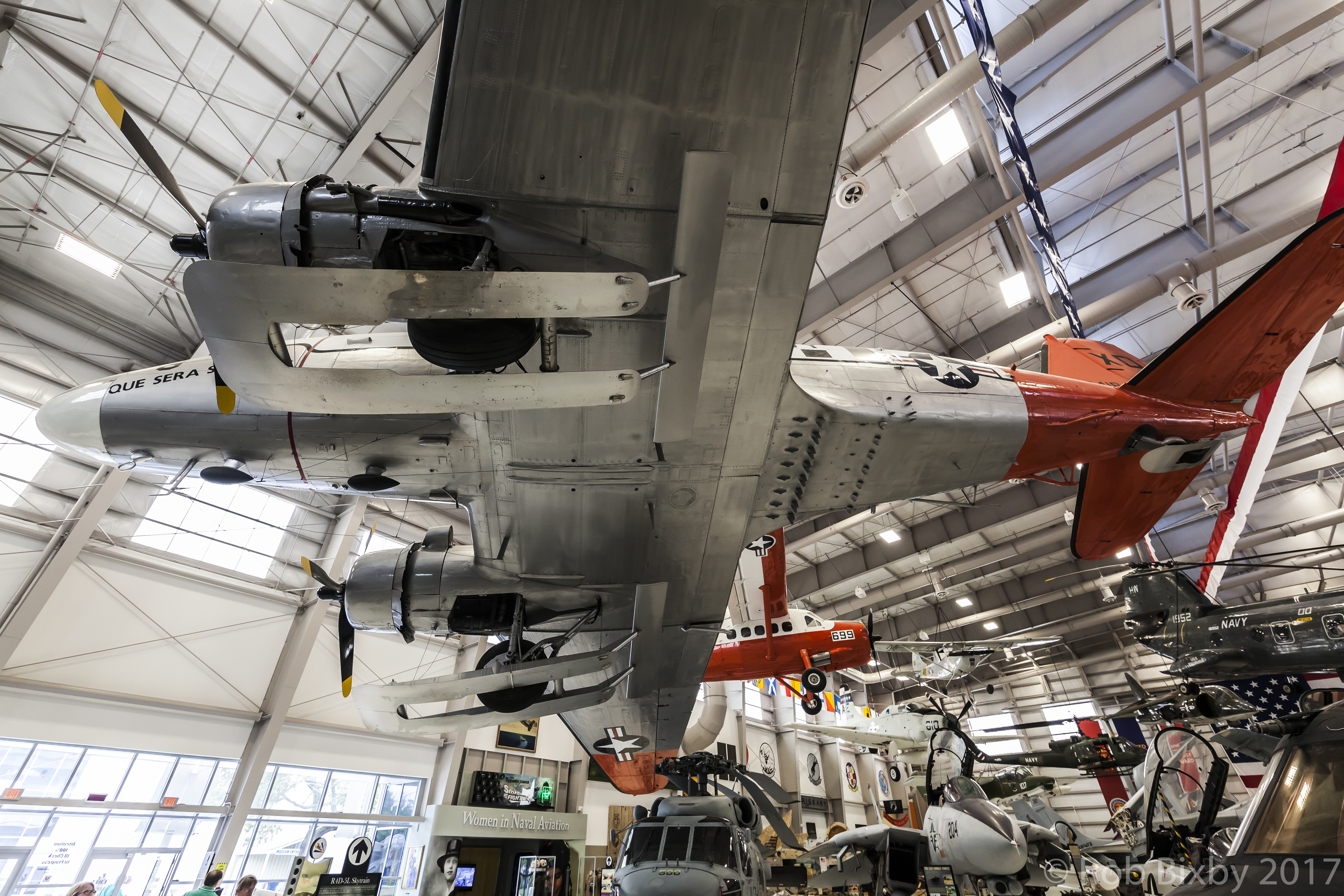
The R4D-5L Que Sera Sera, the first aircraft to land at the South Pole, on display at the National Naval Aviation Museum showing Federal-built skis

The company was founded in 1925 after F.J. Ditter talked to pilots and realized there was a need for skis. It built a single aircraft, the H-150, in 1928. In 1931, Ditter received a patent for his skis.

By 1940, it had received contracts from the military for skis to support the development of bases in places such as Alaska and Newfoundland. During World War II, it also produced portable aircraft service hoists. By 1946, the company's prominence in the industry led it to be considered an unofficial laboratory for skis for the Army Air Force.

While working at the company William C. Kaercher, Jr. developed wheel skis for the C-47 that were eventually used in Operation Highjump. The design was then converted for light aircraft, for which it was first sold in 1950.

The company began producing non-aviation products in 1953 with the introduction of its "sodcutter" device. Two years later it started building sawhorses. By 1957, the company had further diversified, with Federal Hardware Products being one of its four business units. It introduced a new "air glide" brand of skis in 1958. However, Ditter sold the company in 1964 due to poor health. The new owners renamed it SodMaster and sold the Federal Ski and Engineering division to FluiDyne Engineering Corporation. After some years under a third owner, it was sold again to William Kaercher and renamed Turfco in 1978.

=== Legacy ===
Following their purchase by FluiDyne, Federal-designed skis were manufactured by Genaire, an aircraft overhaul company, in St. Catharines, Ontario. By this point, the product line was claimed to make up 90 percent of the worldwide demand for airplane skis.

The rights to Federal skis were eventually acquired by Wipaire, who sold them to F. Atlee Dodge Aircraft Services in February 2023. (Note: The date Wipaire acquired the rights is unclear, but it is no later than 2000 according to an archived version of the company's website. The company received a supplemental type certificate for a model of Federal skis in February 1993. FluiDyne was purchased by Aero Systems Engineering a few months later.)
