= US Aircraft A-67 Dragon =

Single-engine ground-attack aircraft

A-67 Dragon
- First flight of the A-67

General information
- Type: Counter-insurgency aircraft
- Manufacturer: US Aircraft Corp
- Status: In development
- Number built: 1

History
- First flight: October 2006

The US Aircraft A-67 Dragon is a single-engine, propeller-driven, ground-attack aircraft. It is designed for counter-insurgency (COIN), close air support (CAS), and intelligence, surveillance and reconnaissance (ISR) missions. The A-67 is a low-cost aircraft built for low-intensity conflict situations, with a reported unit price of $4–5 million. The sole aircraft built is in storage at the MAPS Air Museum.

== Specifications (A-67 prototype) ==
Data from Aircraft Comparison

General characteristics

- Crew: 2
- Length: 34 ft 1.2 in (10.394 m)
- Wingspan: 38 ft (12 m)
- Wing area: 211 sq ft (19.6 m^{2})
- Empty weight: 4,800 lb (2,177 kg)
- Max takeoff weight: 10,200 lb (4,627 kg)
- Powerplant: 1 × Pratt & Whitney Canada PT6A-68/3 turboprop, 1,250 shp (930 kW)
- Propellers: 4-bladed constant-speed propeller

Performance

- Maximum speed: 371 kn (427 mph, 687 km/h)
- Range: 1,634 nmi (1,880 mi, 3,026 km)
- Service ceiling: 35,000 ft (11,000 m)
- Rate of climb: 4,882 ft/min (24.80 m/s)
- Wing loading: 35.1 lb/sq ft (171 kg/m^{2})
- Power/mass: 0.216 hp/lb (0.355 kW/kg)

== See also ==
Aircraft of comparable role, configuration, and era

- AHRLAC Holdings Ahrlac
- Air Tractor-L3Harris AT-802U Sky Warden
- Beechcraft T-6 Texan II
- Embraer EMB 314 Super Tucano
- KAI KT-1
- Pilatus PC-21
- Piper PA-48 Enforcer
- PZL-130 Orlik
- TAI Hürkuş
