= Light Attack/Armed Reconnaissance =

2009–2020 US Air Force aircraft acquisition program

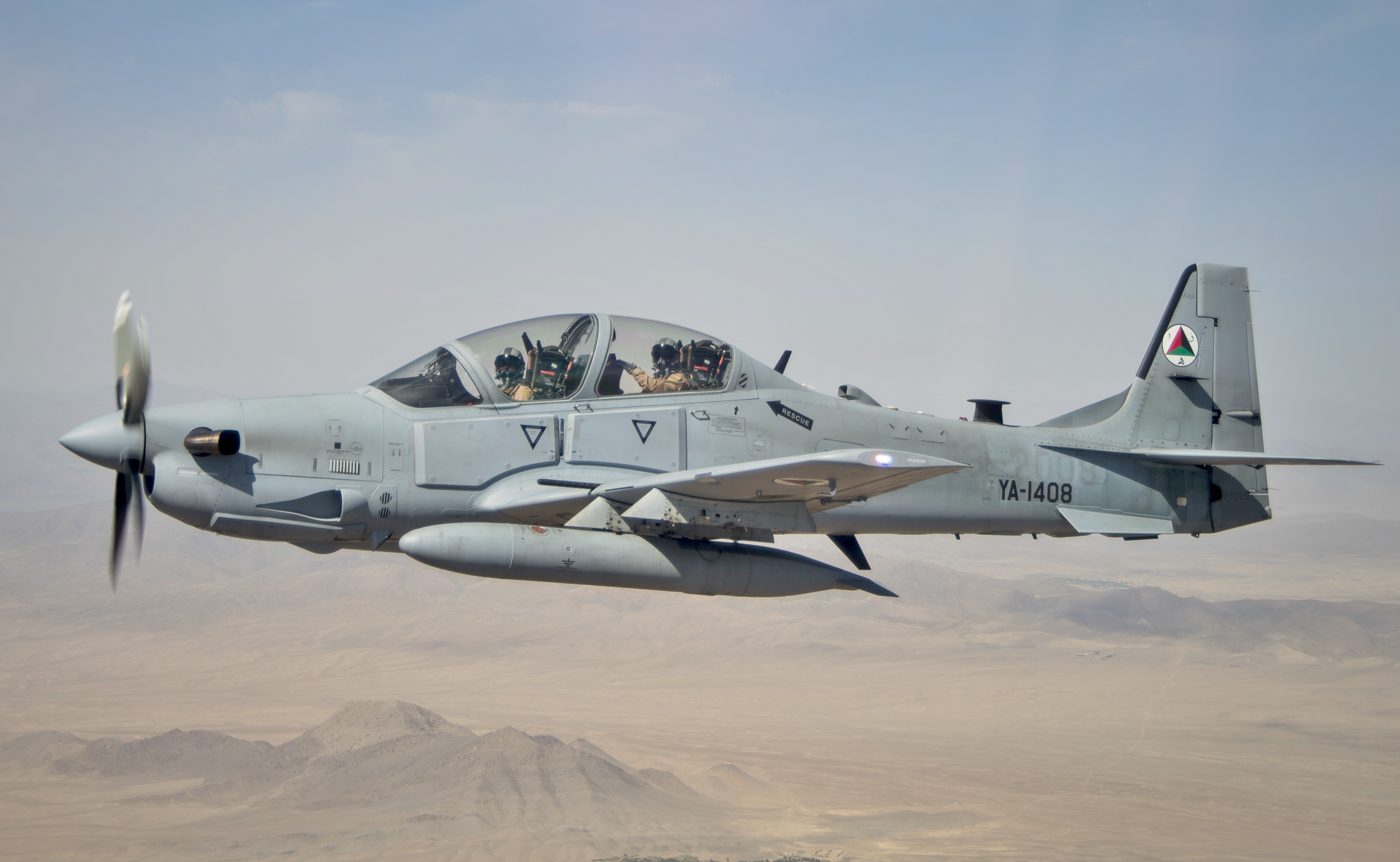
The A-29 Super Tucano won the Light Air Support contract and was used by the Afghan Air Force

The Light Attack/Armed Reconnaissance (LAAR) or Light Air Support (LAS) program was a United States Air Force program for a new light counter-insurgency, ground attack and reconnaissance aircraft. The aircraft should be capable of finding, tracking, and attacking targets either on its own or in support of ground forces. The program formally began in July 2009 with a request for information. No request for proposal has yet been issued. Approximately 100 aircraft were expected to be ordered, but USAF has reduced the number of aircraft sought to 15 aircraft. The 15 aircraft program was focused at training pilots, not a combat mission. This program has also been called the OA-X program or the AT-X program, although the reduced scope of the LAAR program has forced the USAF to push an "OA-X" program indefinitely into the future. In late 2019, the program received renewed attention by lawmakers, who expressed their frustrations with the program's pace. A group of legislators introduced amendments to the House and Senate versions of the FY 2020 National Defense Authorization Act that would transfer control of the program to the commander of U.S. Special Operations Command.

In February 2020, following the release of the Pentagon's FY 2021 budget request, it was announced that the Air Force "will not move forward with a Program of Record for light attack planes," effectively killing the project. U.S. Special Operations Command, meanwhile, announced an industry day for their Armed Overwatch program, a new and independent effort to secure around 75 crewed, fixed-wing aircraft for "CAS, Armed Reconnaissance, Strike Coordination & Reconnaissance, and Airborne Forward Air Control."

== History ==
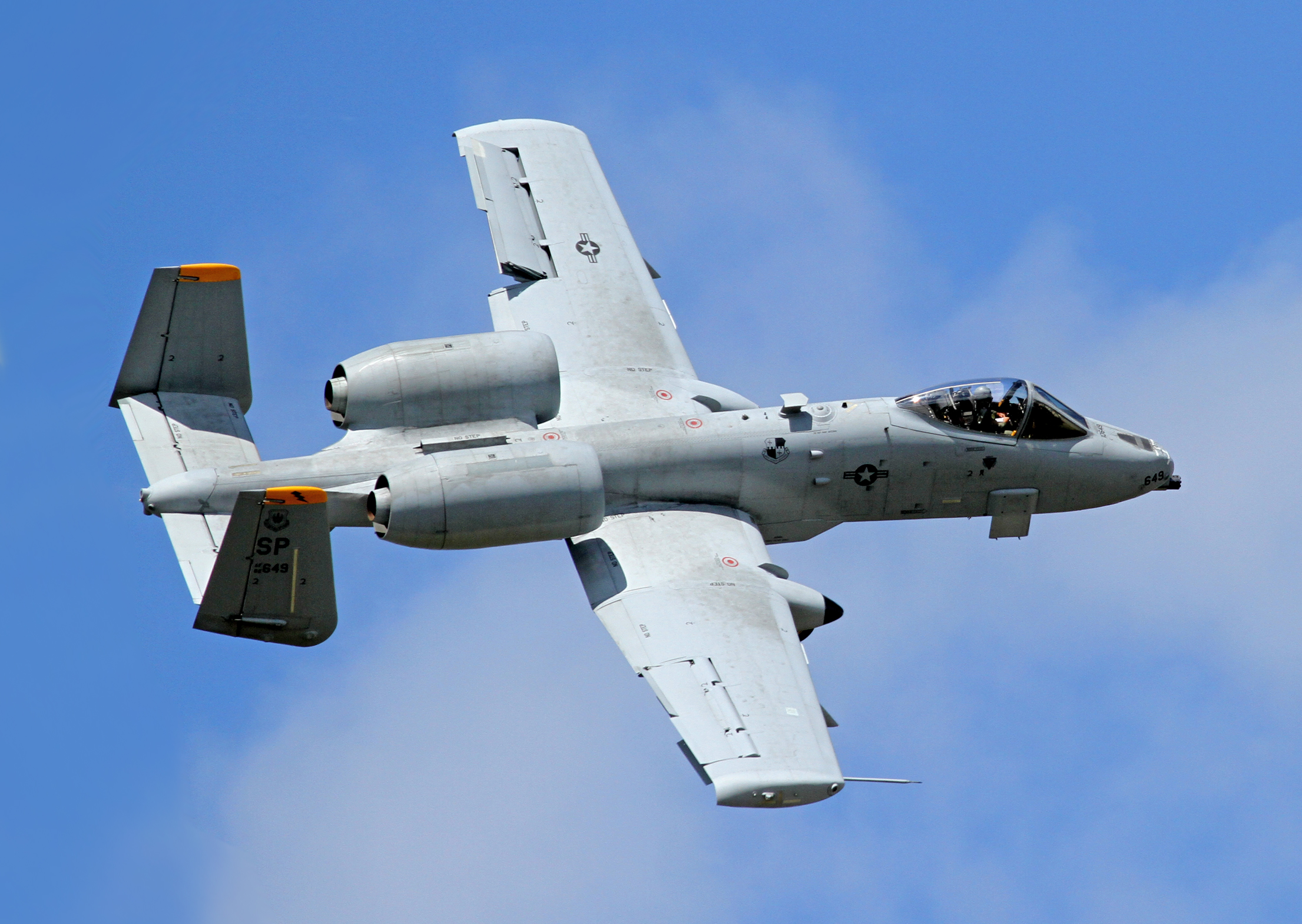
While the A-10 is a well-versed CAS platform, it is also an older and more costly aircraft.

The 2009 Light Attack/Armed Reconnaissance program was born out of the need for a new close air support aircraft that was suited to the type of combat the United States was facing in post 2003-invasion Iraq and Afghanistan. The close air support role was carried out by several different aircraft, including the A-10 Thunderbolt II, the B-1B Lancer, the F-16 Fighting Falcon, and the F-15E Strike Eagle. While all of these aircraft are capable of close air support, only the A-10 was purpose-built for the type of support needed by ground troops in a "low intensity conflict," or COIN (COunterINsurgency), operation.

For example, these aircraft often do not have the loiter time needed for these missions and require aerial refueling support, making their missions more expensive. Additionally, long loiter missions use up an airframe's service life faster than expected, requiring replacement. This may cause issues in the future as some aircraft, such as the A-10, are out of production and cannot be replaced.

To solve this problem, the United States Air Force released a Request for Information (RFI) on July 27, 2009, requesting details of a possible Light Attack/Armed Reconnaissance aircraft that could be outfitted to specific requirements (see Requirements below) and enter into service in 2013.

The Air Force planned to acquire approximately 100 aircraft in the RFI, but has since reduced the initial requirement to 15 aircraft. A more detailed Request for Proposals (RFP) has not been released as of September 2010.

In 2011 the House Armed Services Committee moved to block funding for the program until the requirements and acquisition were validated.

In November 2011 it was revealed that the Beechcraft AT-6B had been excluded from the competition by the USAF, leaving the Embraer A-29 the probable winner, with a contract expected to be awarded in December 2011. According to GAO: “the Air Force concluded that HBDC [Hawker Beechcraft Defense Company] had not adequately corrected deficiencies in its proposal. In this regard, the agency concluded that multiple deficiencies and significant weaknesses found in HBDC’s proposal make it technically unacceptable and results in unacceptable mission capability risk”. Hawker Beechcraft's protest against its exclusion was dismissed.

On December 30, 2011, the USAF announced that the A-29 had been awarded the contract. But the contract award was disputed and a stop-work was issued the following January. All motions will be due to U.S. Court of Federal Claim by March 6, 2012.

A re-awarding of the contract was expected in January 2013, but was delayed a few months. The A-29 was reawarded the contract on February 27, 2013. And Beechcraft again challenged the contract. But the USAF ordered that the construction start anyway. Beechcraft's allies in the Kansas Republican congressional delegation then called for the work to be stopped, while Embraer's congressional allies in Florida praised the USAF's move. The USAF has instructed for work to continue unless a federal court orders otherwise. The United States Court of Federal Claims upheld the USAF's decision to proceed with the contract work.

=== OA-X demonstration ===
In summer 2017, the U.S. Air Force will conduct flight demonstrations at Holloman AFB, New Mexico for the OA-X capability assessment for light attack and armed reconnaissance missions from austere locations : it will choose up to four industrials to bring one or two off-the-shelf low-cost, light-attack aircraft for a 300-aircraft need. It is required to have a 90% availability day and night, fly 900 hours per year for 10 years, take off on 6,000 ft runways, burn a maximum of 1,500 lb./hr of fuel over 2.5-hr. and its survivability should be evaluated by its infrared and visual signature.

Current competitors include Embraer and Sierra Nevada's A-29 Super Tucano as well as the Textron Aviation Defense AT-6 Wolverine turboprop and the American-made Textron Aviation Defense Scorpion light jet. Other possibilities includes the Leonardo M-346F, the BAE Systems Hawk, the Boeing OV-10X, a Boeing/Saab T-X variant, a Lockheed Martin/KAI T-50 variant, the Iomax Archangel, the L3 Technologies OA-8 Longsword, the Northrop Grumman/Scaled Composites ARES, the KAI KA-1, the TAI Hürkuş-C, and the FMA IA 58 Pucará,

The South African high-wing, twin-boom pusher turboprop Paramount Mwari developed with Boeing could be evaluated too, but Boeing won't take part of the flight demonstration. Lockheed neither, as the T-50A may not meet runway and fuel burn requirements, but this isn't ruling out one or the other participating in OA-X later.

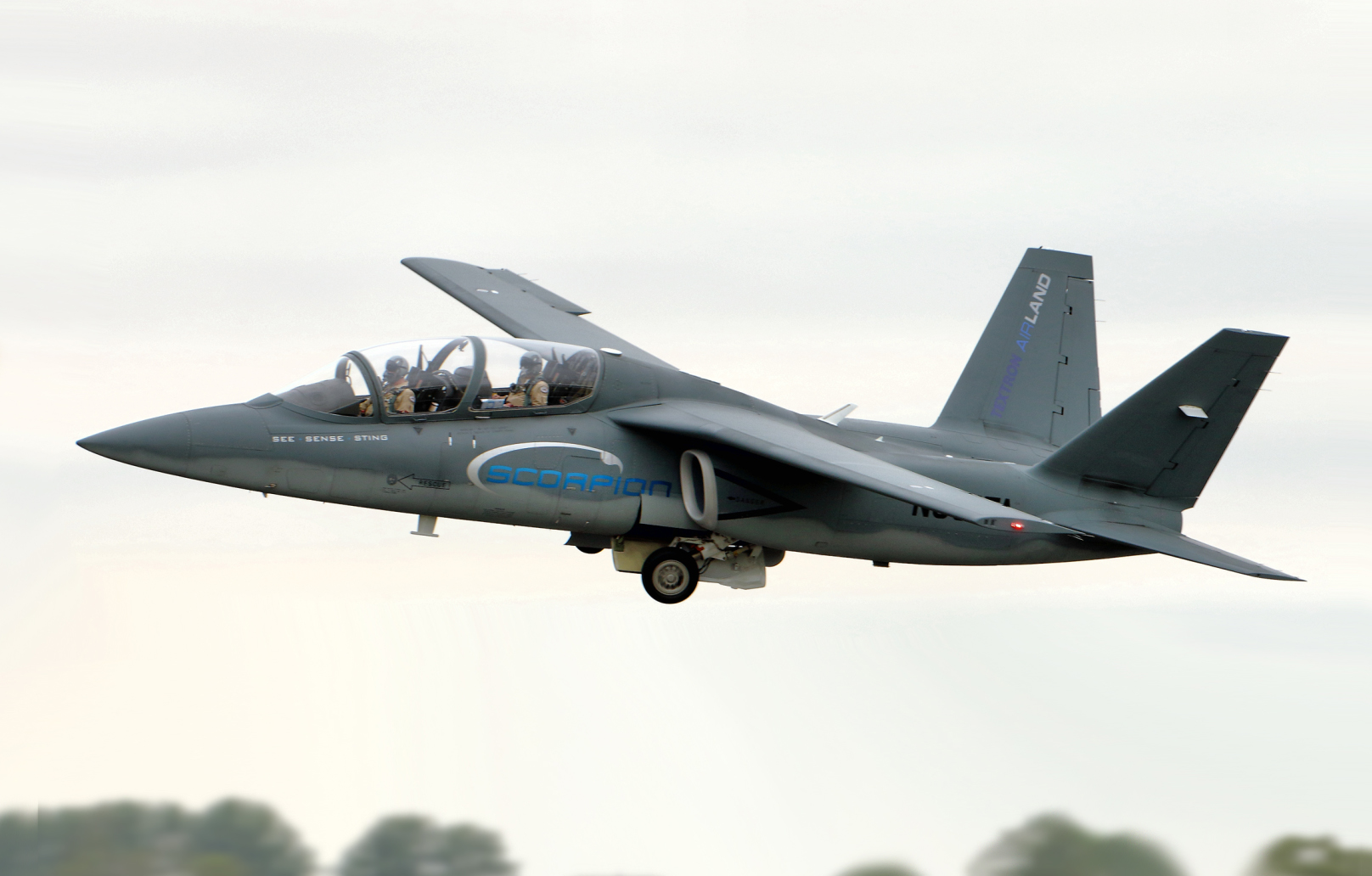
The Textron AirLand Scorpion

Four contenders were displayed on Aug. 9 : the Textron Scorpion jet, Embraer/Sierra Nevada A-29 Super Tucano, Textron AT-6B and L3 Longsword turboprops, graded on basic surface attack and close air support, both including at night, daytime ground assault and rescue escort; but also austere environment performance, rapid turn rate, weapons qualifications, sensors and communication systems, low field operating costs and affordable upfront procurement cost.

In February 2018, after selecting the two finalists, the US Air Force decided against holding a planned combat demonstration to aid in selecting an aircraft type on combat performance, and opted instead to work closely together with the manufacturers of the two selected finalist aircraft to determine the best aircraft and proceed with rapid acquisition.

=== Second stage ===
In April 2018, after deciding to forgo a combat demonstration, the US Air Force decided to advance with a second phase of the LAAR program. The second phase involves examining sustainment requirements, the ability to network with friendly aircraft, and operating costs.

=== Renewed attention, FY 2020 NDAA amendment ===
In April 2019, SOCOM Commander Gen. Richard Clark testified before the House of Representatives that "light attack is a need for SOCOM, and I think it's a need for our nation," arguing that light attack aircraft would be useful both to US forces themselves and to smaller allied forces. In October of that year, the Air Force released final requests for proposal specifying the purchase of 1-3 AT-6 and A-29 aircraft. SOCOM would take control of the A-29s, but only for use in developing a curriculum to train pilots from partner nations. Similarly, Air Combat Command would receive the AT-6s, but only for further testing and development of "exportable, tactical networks." Though lawmakers had expressed displeasure with the Air Force's handling of the program before this, the final RFP secured passage of an amendment to the FY 2020 NDAA, giving U.S. SOCOM the authority to purchase light attack aircraft using funds the Air Force had been given for the project. The amendment grants the Commander of U.S. SOCOM the authority to procure light attack aircraft, should the Commander certify to congressional defense committees that "a mission capability gap and special-operations-forces-peculiar acquisition requirement exists which can be mitigated with procurement of a light attack aircraft capability." The NDAA also provides for the type certification of light attack aircraft, should it become necessary. As the A-29 is currently the only aircraft type-certified by the US Military for light attack, this provision allows SOCOM to choose either the A-29 or AT-6, and obtain certification afterward.

=== Project cancellation ===
In early 2020, the Air Force announced its decision to halt its light attack program. Air Force spokeswoman Ann Stefanek stated that the service would continue with plans to use existing funds to buy two aircraft apiece from Textron and Sierra Nevada Corp. These planes, however, will be used as test beds for "continued experimentation on exportable network/data link capabilities for allies and partners," not as prototypes for a potential larger buy.

== Requirements ==
The selected LAAR aircraft was intended to meet several key requirements, including:

- Rough field operations. The RFI requires that the aircraft be capable of operating from semi-prepared runways such as grass or dirt surfaces.
- Defensive package. The aircraft will have to include several defensive measures, including a Missile Approach Warning System (MAWS), a Radar warning receiver (RWR), and chaff and flare dispensers.
- Armored cockpit and engine.
- Long loiter time. The aircraft must be able to fly 5 hour sorties (with 30 minute fuel reserves).
- Range. The aircraft must have a 900 nautical mile (1600 km) ferry range.
- Data link capability. The aircraft is required to have a line-of-sight data link (with beyond line-of-sight desired) capability of transmitting and receiving still and video images.
- Intelligence, Surveillance and Reconnaissance (ISR) capabilities. The aircraft will have to laser track and designate targets, as well as track targets using electro-optical and infrared video/still images.
- Weaponry. The LAAR aircraft will need at least 4 weapons stores capable of carrying a variety of weapons, including 500 lb bombs, 2.75-inch rockets, rail-launched missiles, and illumination flares. The aircraft will also be capable of aerial gunnery, either with an integrated or pylon mounted gun.

Desired traits (but not requirements) included:

- Infrared signature suppression for the engine(s).
- 30,000 ft (9000 m) operational ceiling.
- 6,000 ft (1800 m) takeoff and landing distance.
- Aerobatic capabilities capable of maneuvers such as the Immelmann turn, Cuban eight, and Split S.

== Competitors ==
=== Finalists ===
The following aircraft entered the competition and were selected for final evaluation after having met all requirements:

Hawker Beechcraft AT-6B

The AT-6B is a light attack variant of the T-6 Texan II trainer aircraft used by the United States Air Force, and as such, it was considered to be a favorite for LAAR program, until it was eliminated in November 2011. The USAF later found a mistake in its paperwork. A second contest was initiated and concluded with selection of the A-29 in 2013, to be provided to the Afghan Air Force, with pilots trained in the United States.

A-29 Super Tucano

The Embraer Super Tucano is a light attack and reconnaissance aircraft that is already in use by several nations. In fact, the United States Navy has already leased several of the aircraft to evaluate their suitability in support of special operations missions.

=== Failed bids ===
The following aircraft entered the competition but were denied final evaluation due to not meeting one or more requirements:

Textron AirLand Scorpion

In addition to the AT-6, Textron will demonstrate the capabilities of their Scorpion twin-engine two-seat attack jet, expected to easily outperform the propeller planes. Textron secretly put together the Scorpion with off-the-shelf aircraft parts in just two years time, and presumably would require more time and money to put it into production than the AT-6 or A-29.

OV-10X

Boeing proposed an updated version of their OV-10 Bronco aircraft, currently called the OV-10X for the LAAR competition.

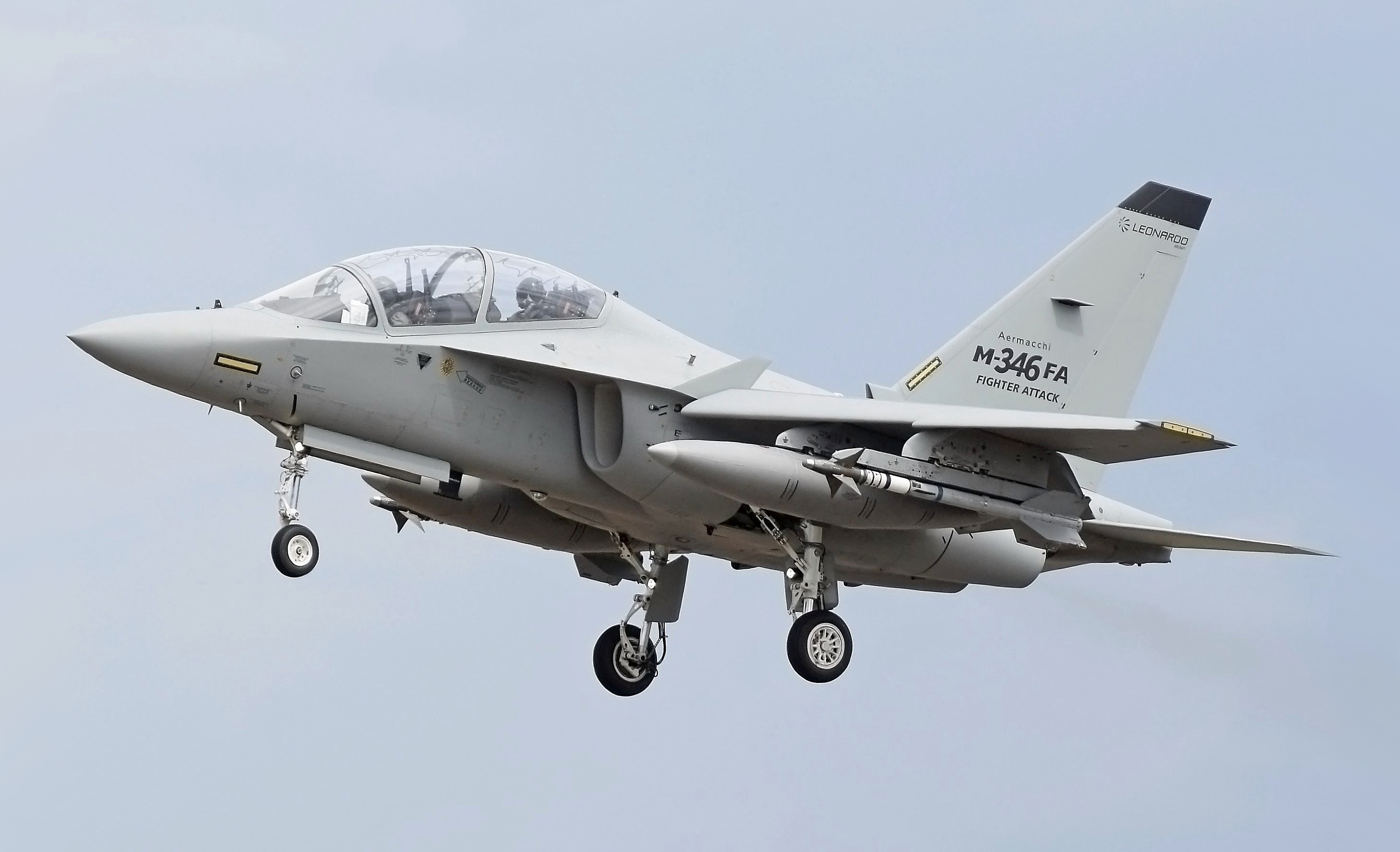
The Alenia Aermacchi M-346 Master

A-67 Dragon

The A-67 Dragon is a Counter-insurgency (COIN) Aircraft currently in development and is slated to begin low rate initial production in the 4th quarter of 2010. The A-67 can achieve 11 hours of loiter on target on internal fuel and can achieve air speeds ranging from 85 to 370 knots.

Air Tractor AT-802U

The militarized version of this crop-duster will include up to 11 hardpoints under the wing and body for bombs, rockets, and machine guns. The Air Tractor aircraft is not planned to include an ejection seat or pressurization systems, both of which are mentioned in the Air Force RFI, but the company predicts that their proposal will cost half as much as other competitors.

Alenia Aermacchi M-346

The M-346 Master was the first jet-powered aircraft proposed for the competition, developed by the Italian Alenia Aermacchi company, and is powered by a pair of Honeywell F124 turbofan engines. The effective range of the aircraft currently is reported to be 1,890 km (1,170 mi) while its armament configuration is centered around nine hardpoints.
