= Eights on pylons =

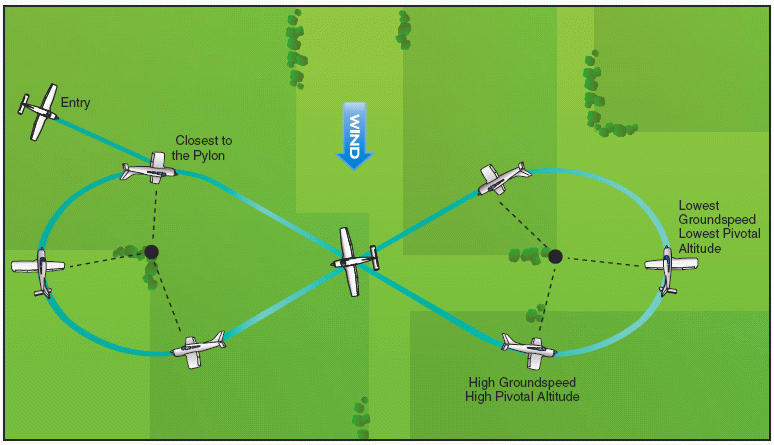
The FAA Airplane Flying Handbook FAA-H-8083-3A gives detailed instructions on flying Eights on Pylons

Eights on pylons or pylon eights is a ground reference maneuver where an aircraft is flown in a figure eight pattern around two selected points on the ground (the pylons). However, eights on pylons differs from similar maneuvers such as eights along a road, eights across a road, or eights around pylons in that the objective of eights on pylons is not to maintain a specific altitude and ground track, but rather to fly the airplane so the pylon remains fixed in place when viewed from the cockpit along a line parallel to the lateral axis of the aircraft. This is only possible when the aircraft is flown at the pivotal altitude corresponding to the current groundspeed. If the aircraft is flying in wind, the groundspeed will vary throughout the maneuver and thus the pivotal altitude will also change. However, the pivotal altitude varies only with the groundspeed and not with the radius of turn or the angle of bank. Whether the maneuver is flown close to the pylon with the aircraft banked 60 degrees, or further from the pylon at 30 degrees bank, the necessary altitude is the same.

In the United States, the Federal Aviation Administration requires pilots to demonstrate eights on pylons to obtain a Commercial Pilot License. It is also a required teaching and demonstration task during the practical test for a flight instructor's certificate.

== See also ==
- Chandelle
- Pylon turn
