= Air Tractor AT-802 =

Agricultural and fire-fighting aircraft

AT-802
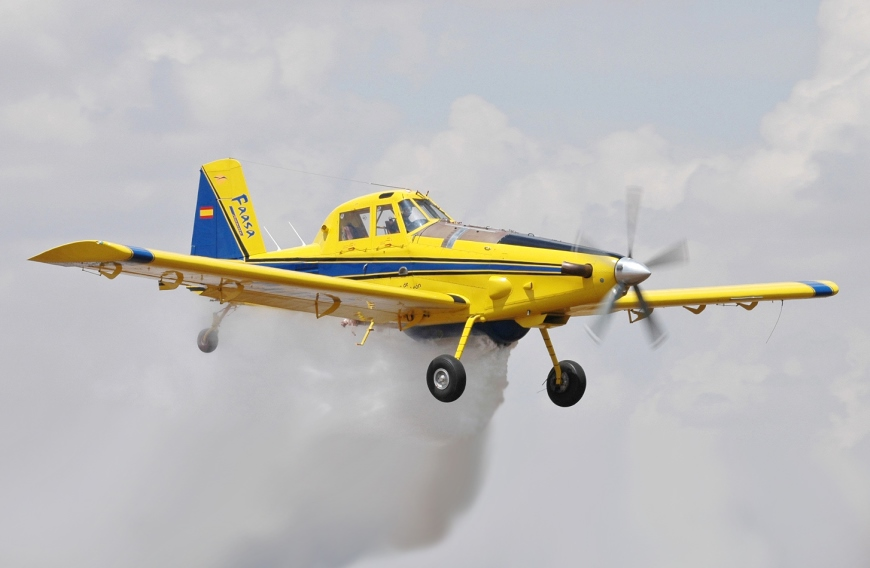
- Air Tractor AT-802

General information
- Type: Agricultural / Fire-fighting aircraft
- National origin: United States
- Manufacturer: Air Tractor
- Status: Active

History
- Manufactured: 1990–present
- First flight: 1990
- Variant: L3Harris OA-1K Skyraider II

The Air Tractor AT-802 is an American agricultural aircraft that may also be adapted into fire-fighting or armed versions. It first flew in the United States in October 1990 and is manufactured by Air Tractor. The AT-802 carries a chemical hopper between the engine firewall and the cockpit. In the U.S., it is considered a Type III SEAT, or Single Engine Air Tanker.

== Development ==
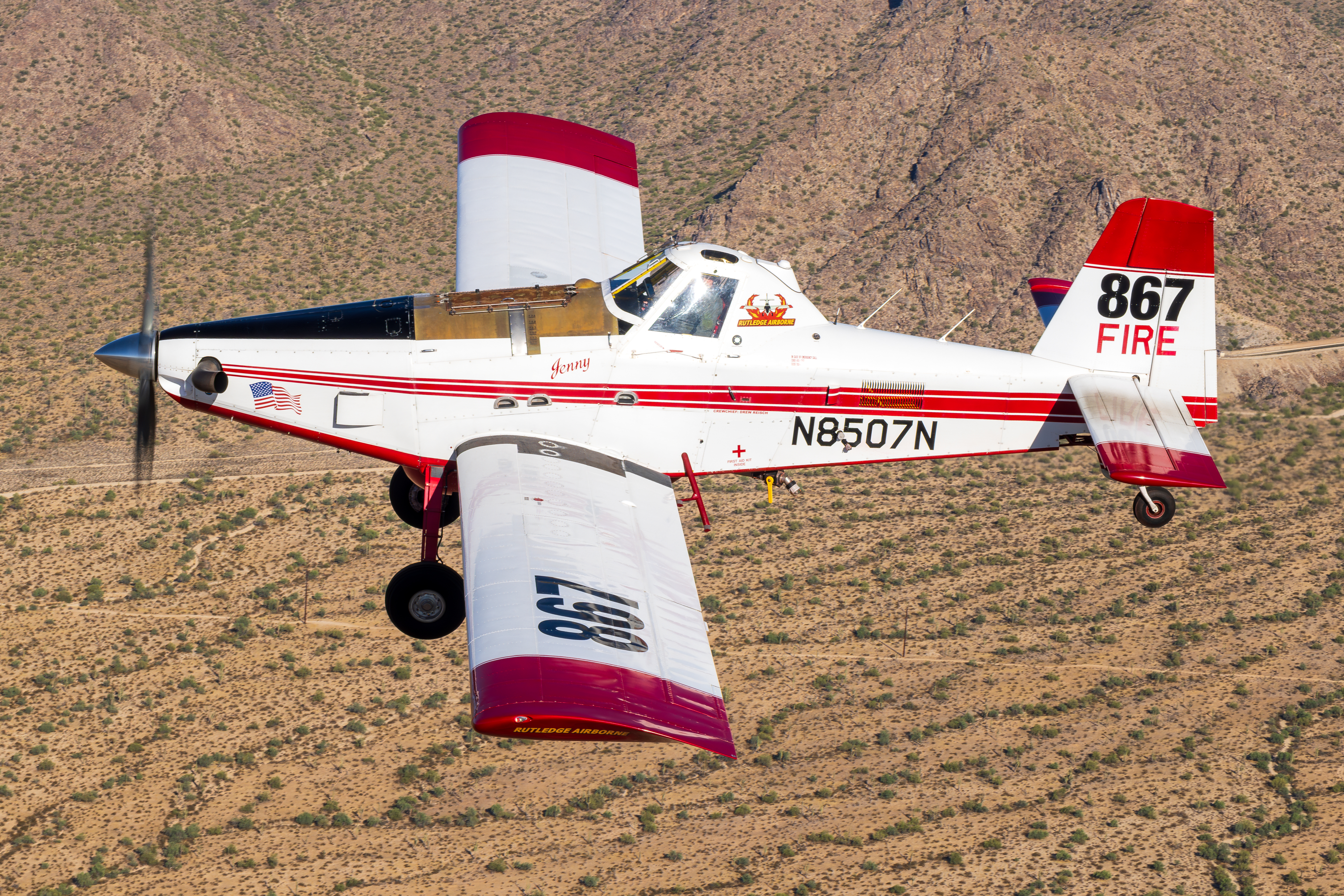
An AT-802A configured for aerial firefighting, over the Superstition Mountains in Arizona, 2023

In its standard configuration, the aircraft utilizes conventional landing gear (two main wheels and a tail wheel). However, a number of aircraft have been converted to the Fire Boss aerial firefighting configuration, which utilizes Wipaire 10000 amphibious floats, so that it can land on a traditional runway or on water. The Fire Boss can scoop water from a lake or river for use on a fire. In addition to the 820 US gallons (3,100 L) standard fuselage-mounted retardant tank, the Fire Boss can have optional 35 US gallons (130 L) foam tanks in the floats. Operations with floats installed have been shown to produce a shorter and narrower retardant drop pattern than wheeled AT-802s.

=== Armed version ===
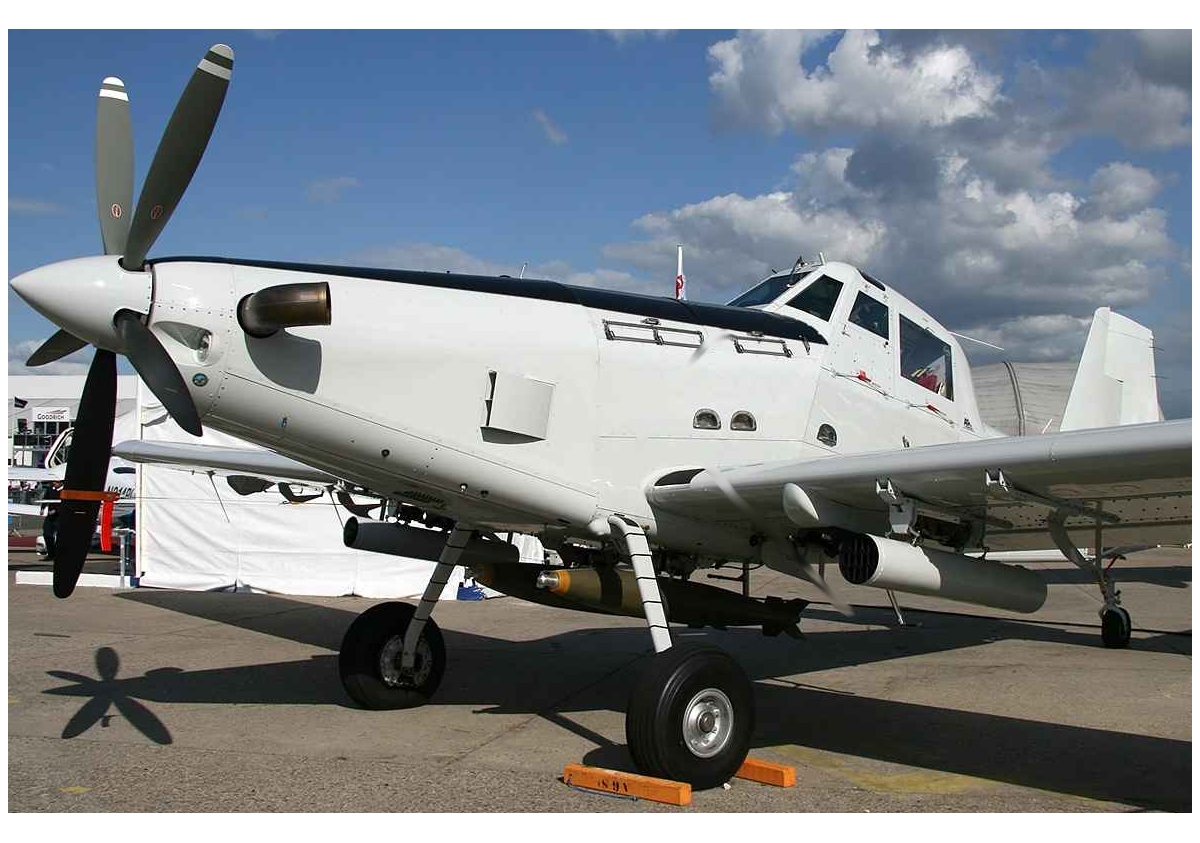
AT-802U prototype at Paris Air Show

In response to the United States Air Force's LAAR program and the growing requirement for light counter-insurgency aircraft, Air Tractor developed an armed model, the AT-802U, in 2008, with engine and cockpit armor, a bulletproof windscreen, self-sealing fuel tanks, and structural reinforcements for the carriage of 9,000 pounds (4,100 kg) of payload. A reinforced wing spar was certified for 12,000 hours of flight time, and the AT-802U was displayed in 2009 at the Paris Air Show.

The AT-802 has also been used in counter-drug operations in the USSOUTHCOM AOR by the U.S. Department of State as a delivery vehicle for herbicides and defoliants over narcotics production facilities.

Ten AT-802i were converted by IOMAX USA into an armed configuration with Roketsan Cirit 2.75" rockets and guided bombs for the UAE Air Force. The UAE operated them until November 2015 when they were replaced by the first three of 24 Archangels on order from Iomax. The Archangel is based on a similar cropduster airframe, that of the Thrush Model 660, however to create the Archangel the basic Model 660 undergoes a much more extensive rebuild in the course of its militarization. Six of the UAE AT-802i were transferred to the Jordanian Air Force with a further three being transferred to the Yemeni Government Forces where they have been used in the 2015 Yemeni Civil War. Reports place Emirati aircraft in Libya flown by contract pilots.

In January 2017, the US State Department approved a deal for twelve AT-802 aircraft for the Kenya Defence Forces, although as of June 2017 a contract for the proposed sale had not been signed.

On 1 August 2022, United States Special Operations Command indicated they would purchase up to 75 AT-802U Sky Warden aircraft to support special operations forces in fighting irregular wars. Air Tractor will manufacture the airframes and L3Harris will then modify them into the Armed Overwatch mission configuration. The planes are intended to perform armed intelligence, surveillance and reconnaissance (ISR) missions at low cost in permissive environments from austere locations, and will allow SOCOM to remove the aging U-28A Draco from combat service. The Sky Warden can deploy guided weapons including the APKWS rocket, GBU-12 laser-guided bomb, and Hellfire and Griffin missiles; it has a six-hour loiter time at a 200 nmi (230 mi; 370 km) radius. The initial contract is for $170 million, with a ceiling of $3 billion for purchase of the full fleet. The plan is for five squadrons of 15 planes, one deployed at a time, three undergoing maintenance, and one for training. Initial service entry is expected in 2026, with all delivered and full operating capability reached in 2029. The AT-802U was given the military designation OA-1K.

== Variants ==
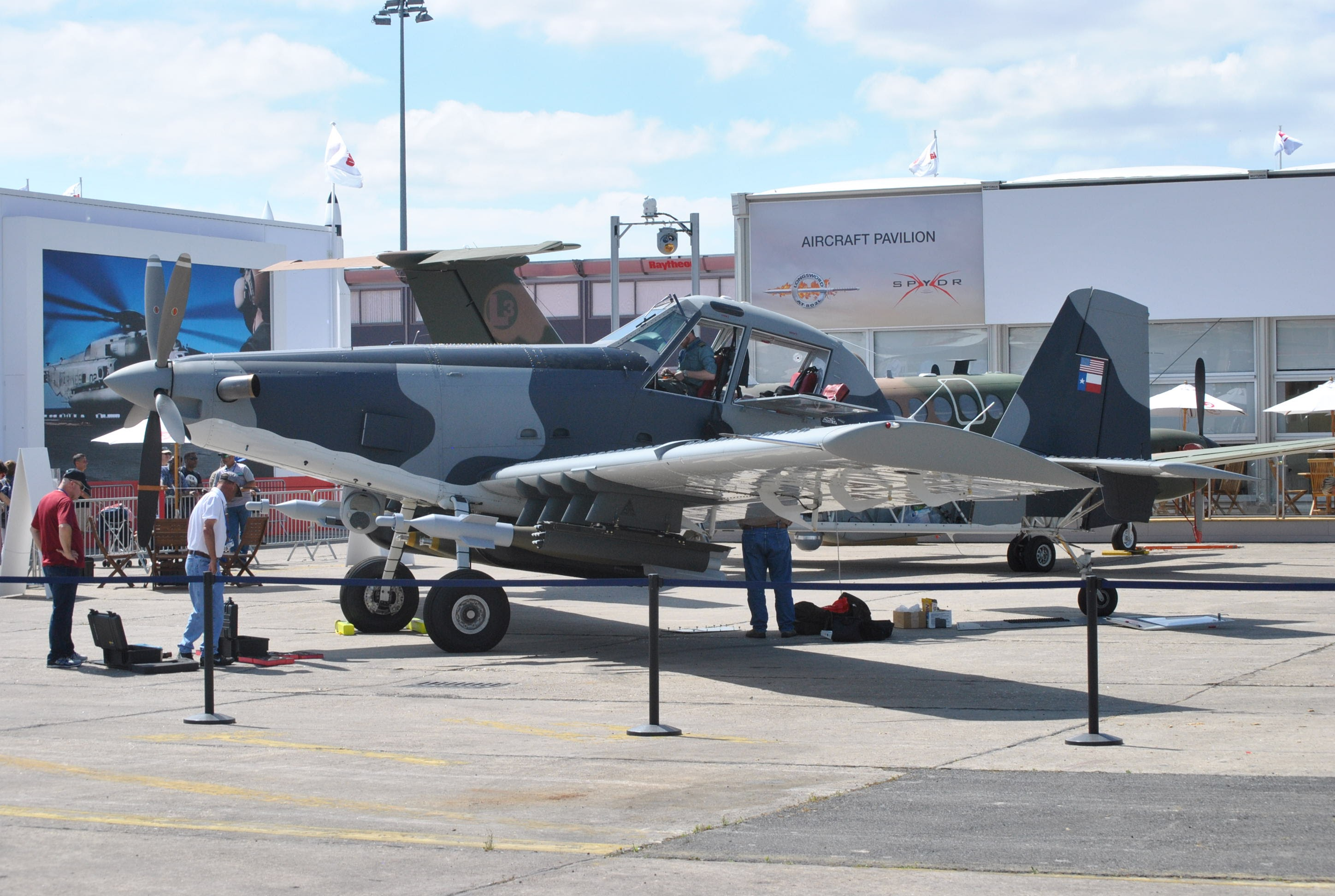
The AT-802L Longsword at Paris Air Show 2017

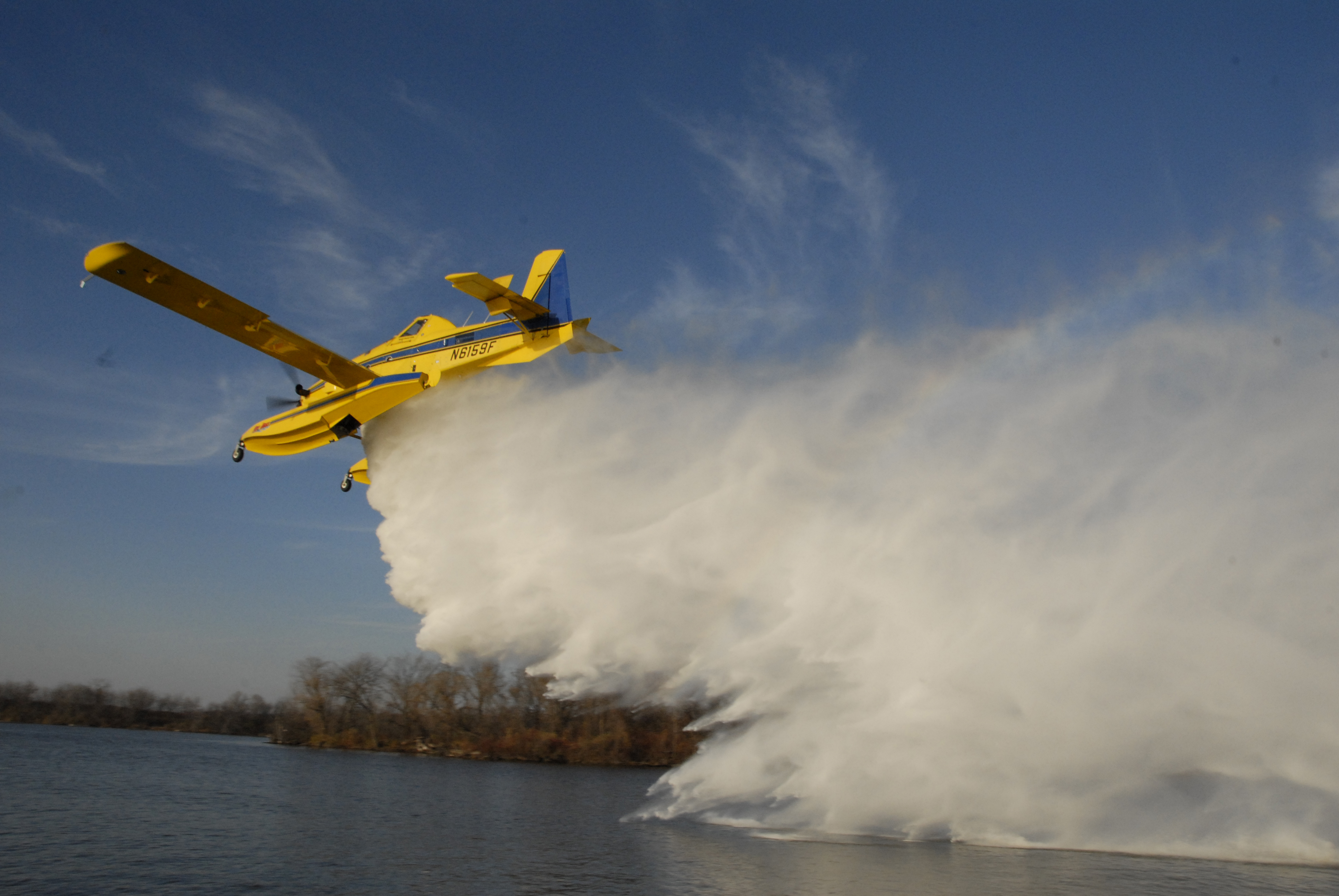
A Fire Boss on floats dropping its load

- AT-802 – two seat (tandem) cockpit
- AT-802A – single-seat cockpit
- AT-802U – two seat (tandem) armored military version, modified with sensors and reinforced for weapons carriage
- L3Harris OA-1K Skyraider II – An ISR Strike Aircraft based on AT-802U. The AT-802U was selected in August 2022 as the winner of the United States Special Operations Command Armed Overwatch programme, with an initial buy of 6 airframes.
- AT-802F or AT-802AF – An aerial firefighting model 802 equipped with the Air Tractor Computerized Firegate designed/developed/serviced by Trotter Controls Inc.
- AT-802F Fire Boss – AT-802F equipped with Wipaire amphibious floats for operations from land or water
- AT-802L Longsword – An ISR and light-attack aircraft based on AT-802U, which developed by L3 Platform Integration collaboration with Air Tractor. L3 rebranded it as OA-8 Longsword for Asia-Pacific region.

== Operators ==
=== Civil ===
The aircraft is popular with aerial application and fire fighting operators.

Algeria

- Tassili Travail Aérien – 6 AT-802 firefighting aircraft.

Australia

- Kennedy Air – 5 AT-802F Fire Boss
- Aerotech – 17 AT-802F Fire Boss

Canada

- Air Spray
- Buffalo Airways
- Conair Group
- Early Bird Air Ltd

Ivory Coast

- AG Aviation

Ethiopia

- AG Aviation

Luxembourg

- Cargolux - 2 AT-802 Fire Boss

MUS

- AG Aviation

Nigeria

- AG Aviation

South Africa

- AG Aviation - Africa and Middle East Operator
- Kishugu Aviation - Firefighting services

United Arab Emirates

- AG Aviation

United States

- Air Spray

=== Military and government ===
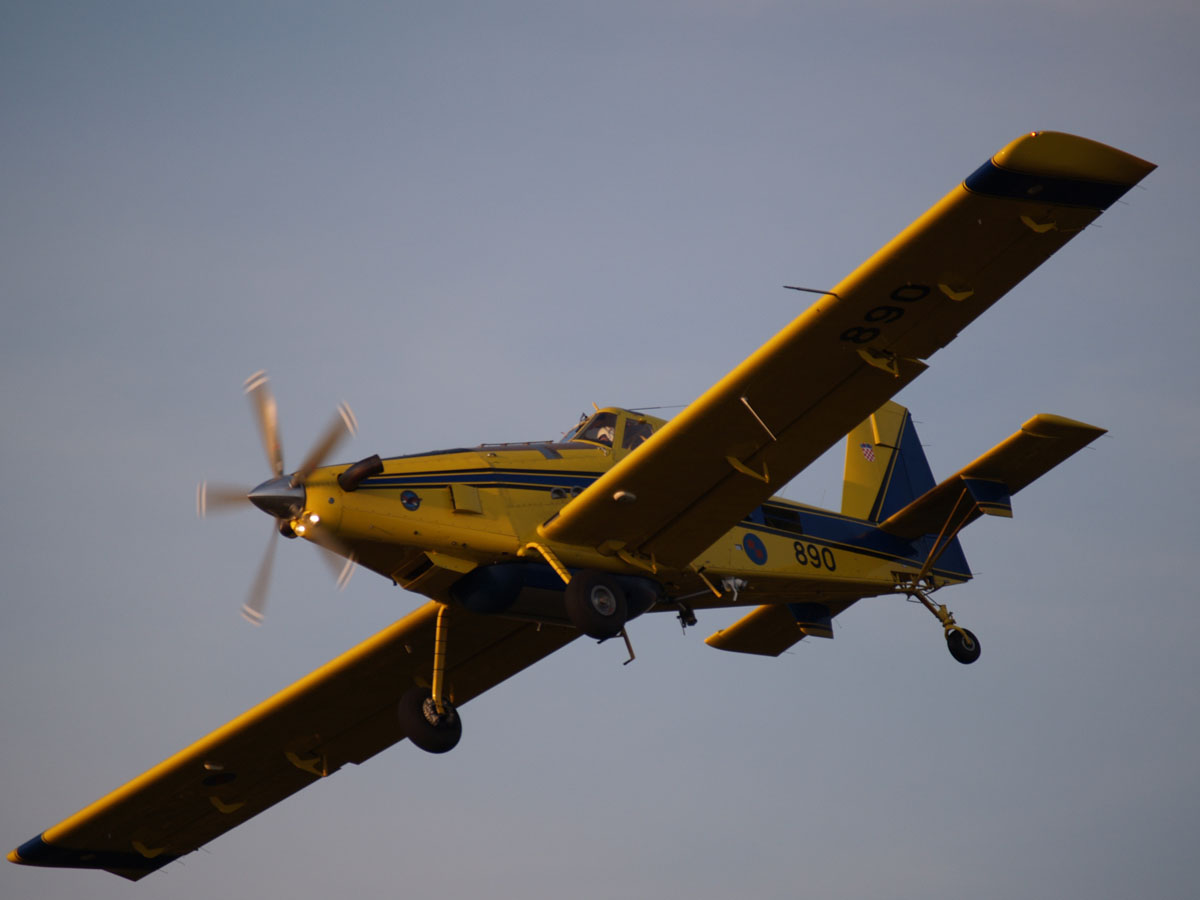
Croatian Air Force AT-802A Fire Boss

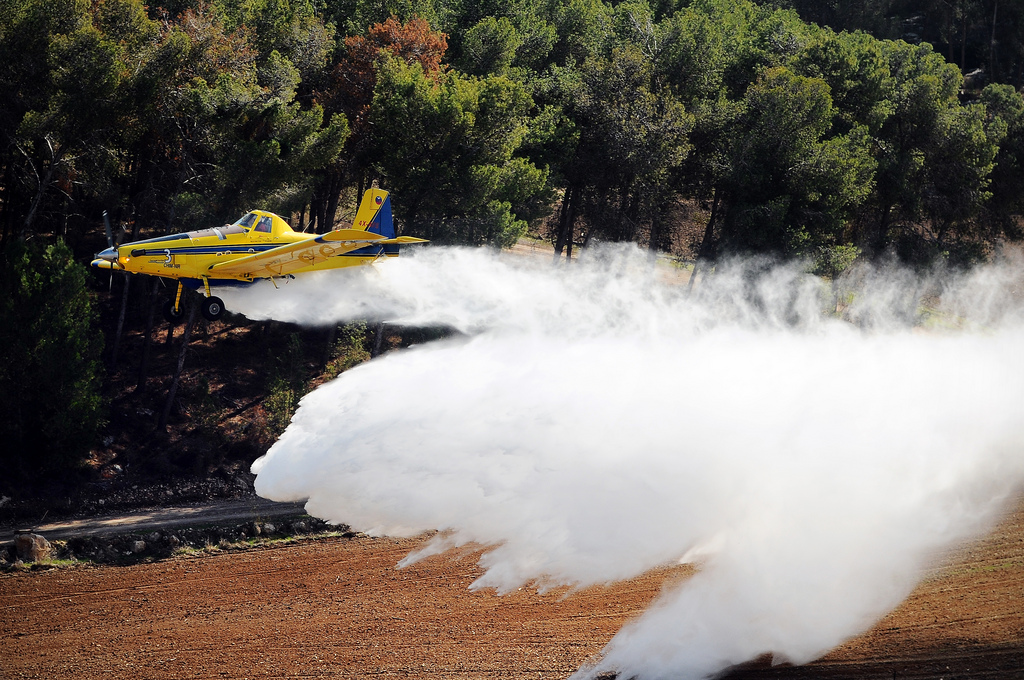
Israeli AT-802F in a firefighting drill

Albania

- Albanian Air Force – 2 (1 on order) AT-802

Australia

- Queensland Fire and Emergency Services

Brazil

- Corpo de Bombeiros Militar do DF 2 AT-802F

Burkina Faso

- Military of Burkina Faso 1 AT-802

Canada

- Government of Northwest Territories

Chile

- National Forestry Corporation – 3 AT-802F

Colombia

- National Police of Colombia – 9 AT-802
- National System of Disaster and Risk Management – 2 AT-802

Croatia

- Croatian Air Force – 5 AT-802A Fire Boss + 1 AT-802F as of November 2014

An Air Tractor AT-802 fire-fighting aircraft of the Cyprus National Guard.

Cyprus

- Cyprus National Guard (Air Command) – 2 AT-802 in the newly created fire-fighting unit

Egypt

- Egyptian Air Force – 12 AT-802U (acquired from the UAE in 2016, first spotted in service in January 2018)

Gambia

- Military of Gambia

Indonesia

- Pertamina

Israel

- Israel Police in Conjunction with Israeli Fire Department – 14 AT-802F, purchased second-hand from Spain (of which 2 formerly were Fire Boss, but exchanged for standard configuration aircraft) 1 crashed due to mechanical malfunction.

Jordan

- Royal Jordanian Air Force – 6 IOMAX AT-802i Block 1 being upgraded to armed Block 2 standard, of which 1 upgraded aircraft delivered as of January 2018 and 4 AT-802s supplied by L-3 Corporation and originally intended for Yemen.

Montenegro

- Police of Montenegro – 1 AT-802 + 3 AT-802A

North Macedonia

- Protection and Rescue Directorate of North Macedonia – 3 AT-802A Fire Boss

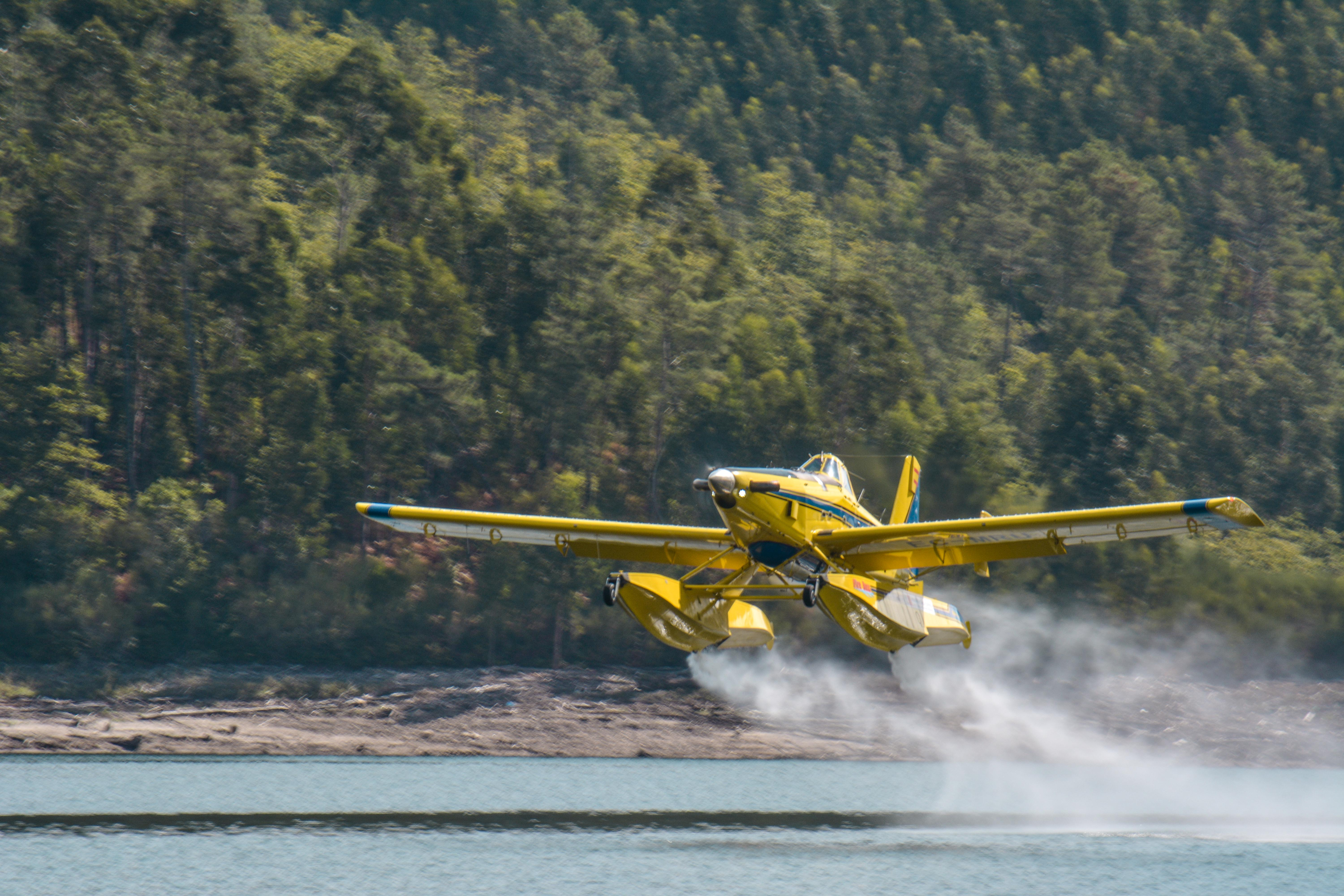
Air Tractor AT-802A of Avialsa during a fire-fighting in Portugal.

Portugal

- Ministry of Internal Administration - contracts out several AT-802 Fire Boss for aerial firefighting

Spain

- Ministry of Environment (CEGISA) – 3 AT-802A
- Avialsa T35 – 15 AT-802 + 14 AT-802F

Slovenia

- Administration for Civil Protection and Disaster Relief – 4 AT-802F Fire Boss

Sweden

- Swedish Civil Defence and Resilience Agency – 4 AT-802 Fire boss

Turkey

- General Directorate of Forestry - 3 AT-802 Fire Boss + 6 AT-802A Fire Boss + 2 AT-802F + 1 AT-802AF (A total of 20 aircraft were ordered, with 15 in the Fire Boss configuration and 5 in the land version. As of 2025, 12 aircraft have been delivered, 8 remain to be delivered by 2027.)

United States

- Minnesota Department of Natural Resources – contracts out 2 AT-802Fs from Aero Spray of Appleton, Minnesota
- US State Department Air Wing – 2 AT-802s, used to spray herbicides on narcotics fields
- United States Forest Service – Multiple AT-802s, used for aerial firefighting
- United States Special Operations Command – contract for an initial six aircraft with a potential delivery of up to 75 aircraft signed in August 2022 for the Armed Overwatch programme.

Yemen

- Yemeni Air Force

=== Former operators ===
United Arab Emirates

- United Arab Emirates Air Force – 24 IOMAX AT-802i BPA

== Specifications (AT-802) ==
Data from Jane's All The World's Aircraft 2003–2004

General characteristics

- Crew: One or Two (AT-802A – single-seat)
- Capacity: 820 US gal (683 imp gal; 3,104 L)
- Length: 35 ft 11 in (10.95 m)
- Wingspan: 59 ft 3 in (18.06 m)
- Height: 12 ft 9 in (3.89 m)
- Wing area: 401.0 sq ft (37.25 m^{2})
- Aspect ratio: 8.8:1
- Airfoil: NACA 4415
- Empty weight: 6,505 lb (2,951 kg)
- Max takeoff weight: 16,000 lb (7,257 kg)
- Powerplant: 1 × Pratt & Whitney PT6A-67AG turboprop, 1,350 shp (1,010 kW)

Performance

- Cruise speed: 221 mph (356 km/h, 192 kn) at 8,000 ft (2,440 m)
- Stall speed: 91 mph (146 km/h, 79 kn) (power off, flaps down)
- Range: 800 mi (1,300 km, 700 nmi)
- Service ceiling: 13,000 ft (4,000 m)
- Rate of climb: 850 ft/min (4.3 m/s)

== See also ==
Related development

- L3Harris OA-1K Skyraider II
