= Pylon turn =

Aerial maneuver

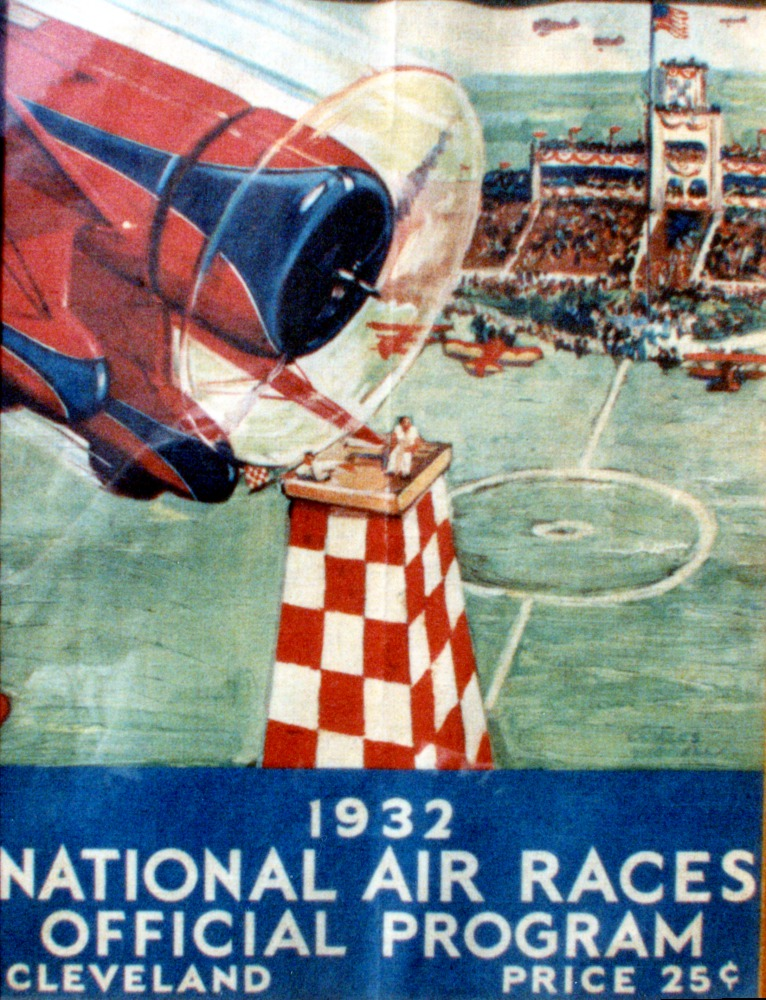
Wedell Williams Model 44 II Poster for the 1932 Thompson Trophy air race in Cleveland, USA

A pylon turn is a flight maneuver in which an aircraft banks into a circular turn, in such a way that an imaginary line projecting straight out the side of the aircraft (nominally the wing) points to a fixed point on the ground. The maneuver originated early in the 20th century in air racing.

In some contexts, simply making a turn around a fixed point on the ground (such as a physical pylon) is called a "pylon turn". In these cases, the altitude may be incorrect for the maneuver to be a proper "pylon turn" where all three parameters (altitude, speed, bank angle) come together for the wing to point to the fixed turning center on the ground.

== Racing ==
The pylon turn was originally used in air racing, where courses were set up with pylons to mark a location on the ground, and the planes would have to turn around at that point before returning to the airstrip. Pylons are also used in triples to set up a triangular circuit for aviation races—races in which all competitors must stay outside of the three pylons.

== Delivery ==
A pylon turn is part of a maneuver also known as "long-line loiter" which can be used to deliver messages or packages by plane without needing to land. In this maneuver it is possible to lower a bucket on a line to the ground in such a way that the bucket remains stationary on the ground, permitting transfer of material. It was used during Operation Auca and depicted in the film End of the Spear, to give gifts to the Huaorani people of Ecuador where there was no landing strip. Later some mail services have used the same technique to deliver mail where there are no available landing strips.

== Geometry ==
The mechanics of the maneuver allow it to occur only at the "pivotal altitude", which is a geometric and aerodynamic construction of ground speed and altitude above the ground.

== Combat use ==
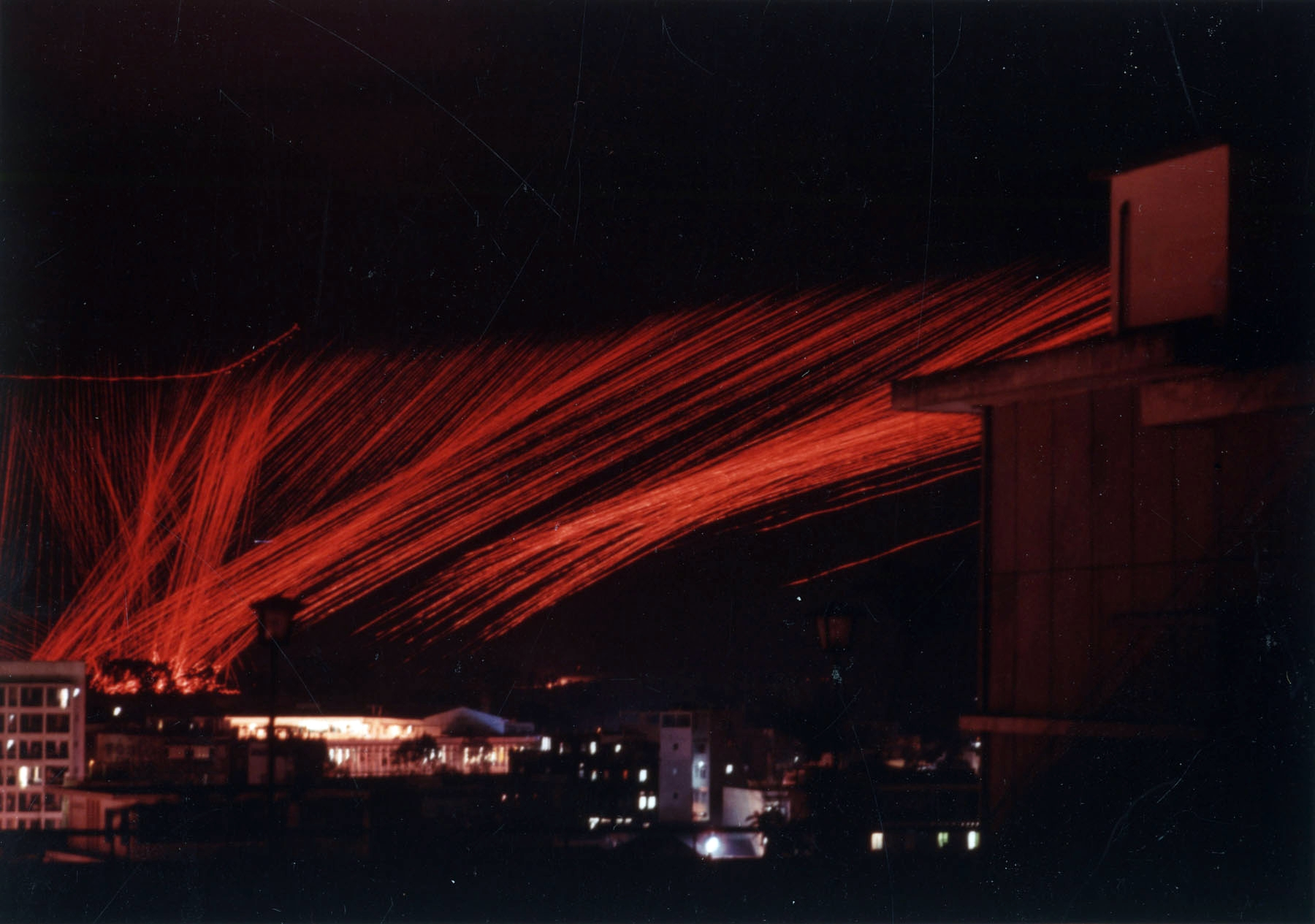
Tracer from an AC-47D converging at the center area of a pylon turn over Saigon, 1968

The first notable combat use of the pylon turn was in the Vietnam War in 1964, with the development of the AC-47 Spooky gunship, which could fire M134 Miniguns and M61 Vulcan rotary cannons mounted on the left side of the aircraft as the pilot circled the target. Later, the more advanced Lockheed AC-130 was used in the same way. Using this maneuver enabled gunners to fire continuously and efficiently at a stationary target for an extended period of time, without needing to make several passes. Another advantage of pylon turns was that the gunfire was accurate enough to be used even in close proximity to friendly troops, which had never before been possible in air power.

A similar method is used by attack helicopters, on which the armament shoots forward. In this case the helicopter strafes sideways in a circle around a single target. This method improves shooting accuracy, increasing hit probability.

== See also ==
- Eights on pylons, an aerial maneuver
- Gunship, the category of military aircraft that employ this maneuver
- Circle strafing, a similar technique used in video games
