= Armed Overwatch =

2021–22 US Special Operations program to purchase new close air support aircraft

Armed Overwatch program
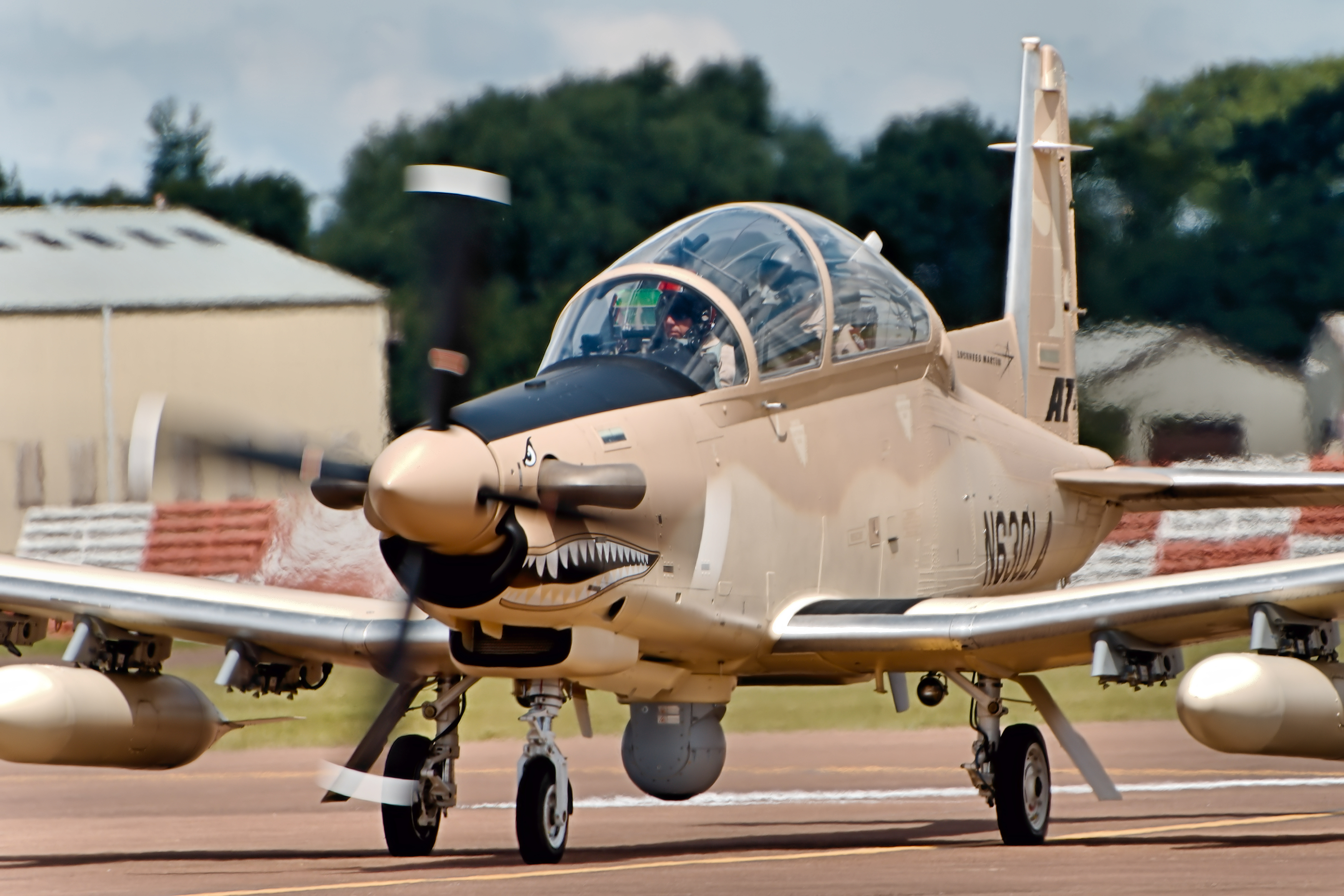
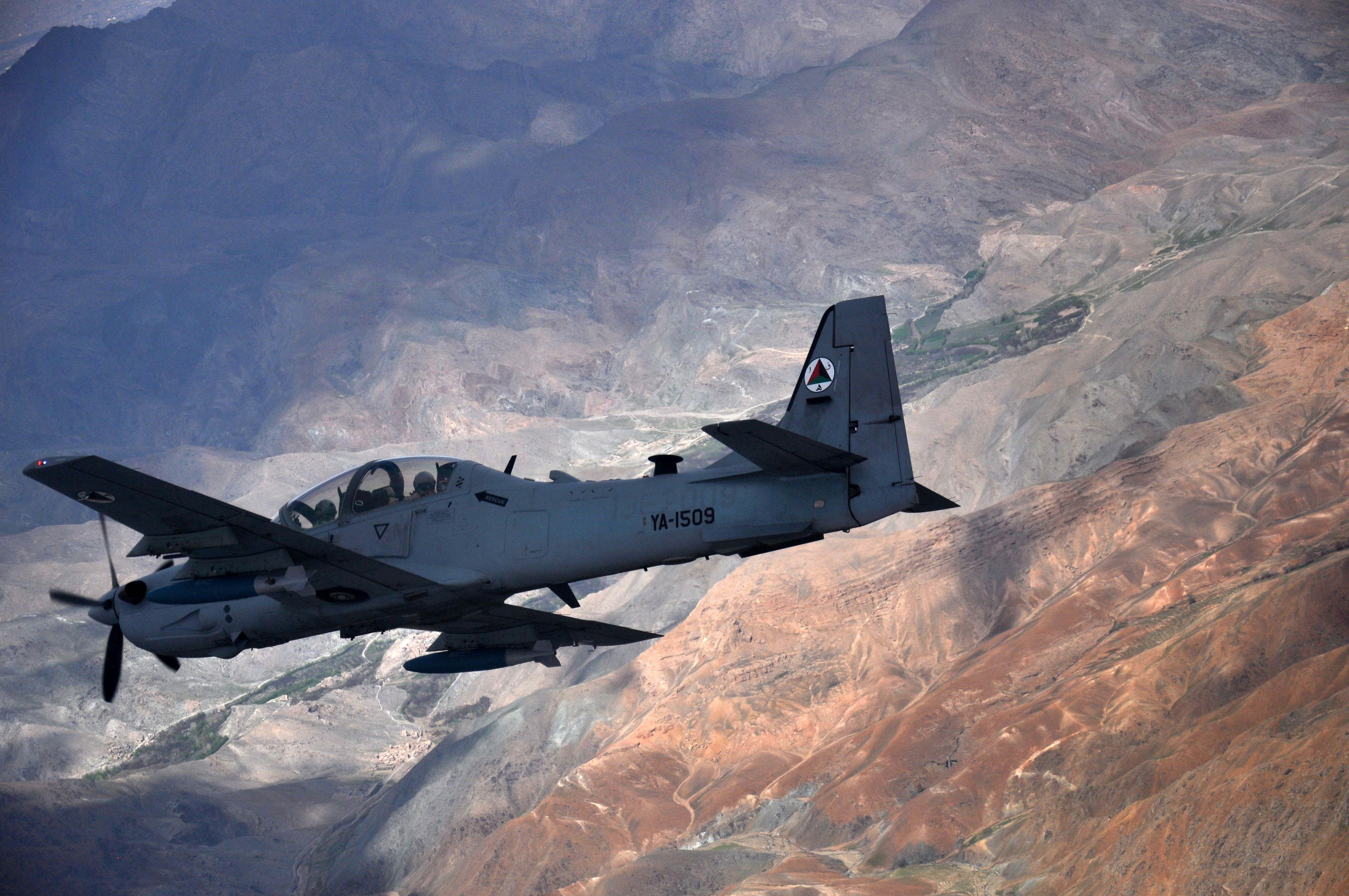
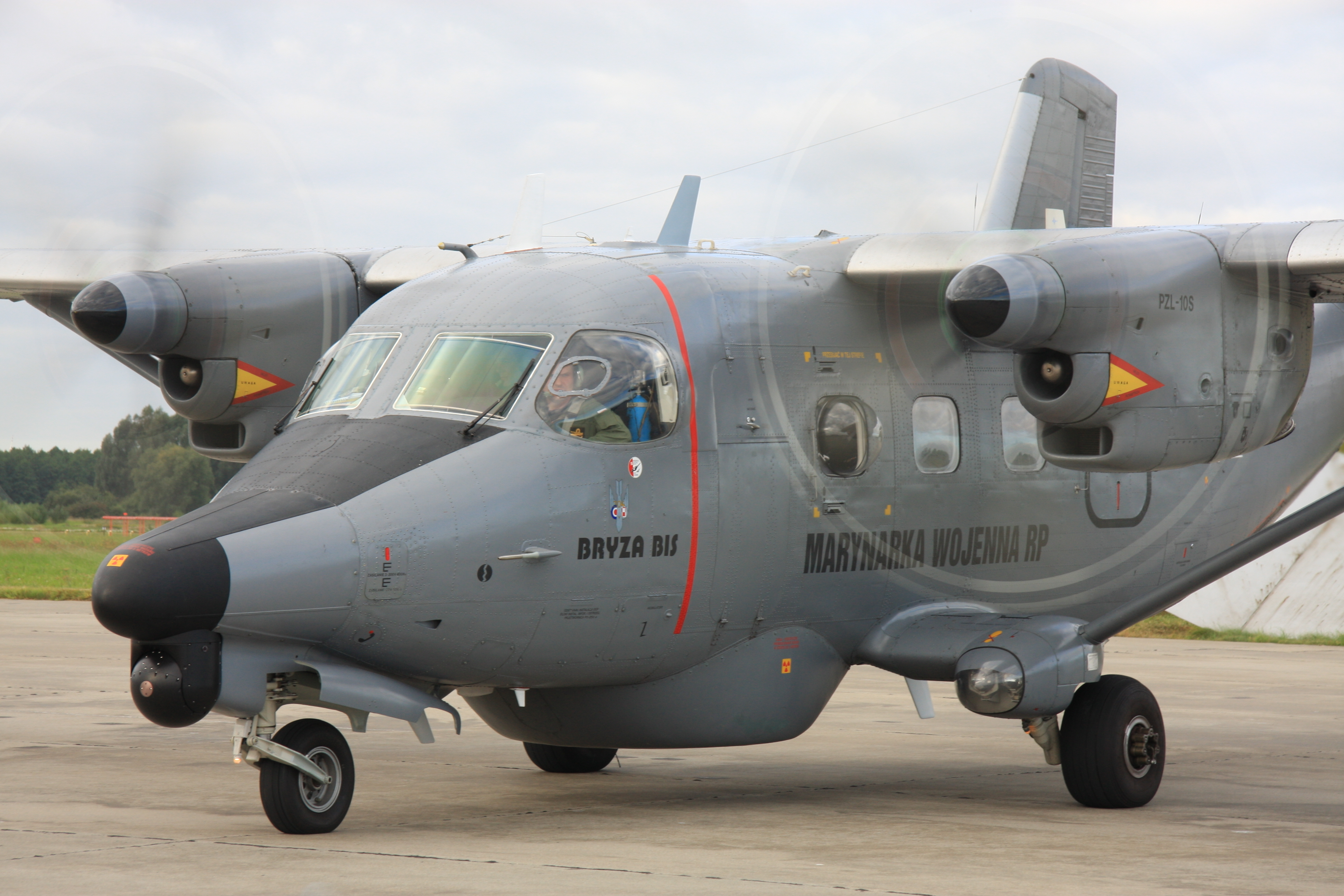
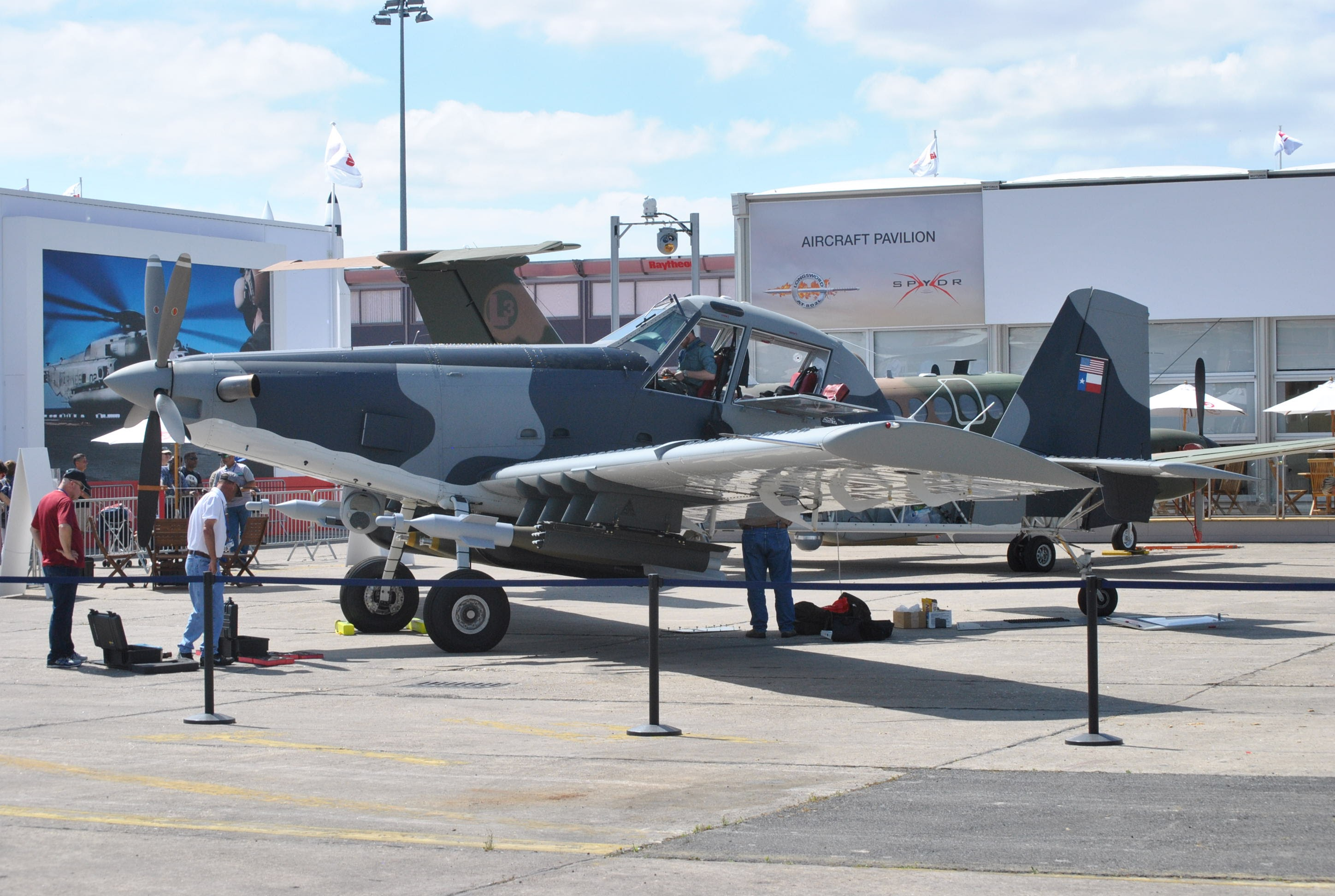
- Clockwise, from top left: The AT-6B Wolverine, A-29 Super Tucano, AT-802L Longsword, and M28B 1R Bryza (variant of C-145A).

History
- Outcome: AT-802U Sky Warden selected

The Armed Overwatch program is an effort launched by U.S. Special Operations Command to purchase roughly 75 crewed, fixed-wing aircraft to perform close air support, precision strike, and ISR missions. The Air Tractor-L3Harris AT-802U Sky Warden system was selected to deliver this capability.

SOCOM plans to use the system as a replacement for the U-28A Draco aircraft for intelligence, surveillance, and reconnaissance flights in remote areas. The U-28As will reach the end of their service life soon, so the Armed Overwatch program is being conducted rapidly, with the aim of selecting a design, retraining crews, and fielding the new aircraft without causing "a decrease in capacity on the battlefield."

Armed Overwatch and its predecessor programs are distinct from the Light Air Support program, a U.S. Air Force competition to select a turboprop attack aircraft for use by the Afghan Air Force, not by U.S. forces.

== History ==
=== Early programs ===
Operations Enduring Freedom and Iraqi Freedom demonstrated that U.S. special operators had an urgent need for surveillance aircraft that could fly out of more austere airfields than those required for U.S. fast jets then in service. To meet this need, in 2006, Air Force Special Operations Command (AFSOC) purchased a batch of 28 commercial Pilatus PC-12 turboprop aircraft, which were modified, loaded with sensor and communication equipment, and designated U-28A. From 2009 to 2020, the U.S. Air Force toyed with the idea of purchasing a small fleet of Light Attack/Armed Reconnaissance aircraft to provide air support to ground forces during COIN operations. In addition to completing intelligence, surveillance, and reconnaissance missions, the envisioned aircraft would be able to complete air strikes for special operators and conventional forces at a fraction of the cost of multirole fighters (such as the F-15E and F-16), jet-powered attack aircraft (such as the A-10), or stealth fighters (such as the F-22 and F-35). In December 2011, the Air Force selected the Embraer A-29 Super Tucano over Beechcraft's AT-6B Wolverine. Congressional opposition, spearheaded by allies of the Kansas-based Beechcraft, repeatedly blocked initial purchasing attempts, and despite several encouraging experiments, the program failed to regain its momentum. The Air Force ultimately canceled the program in early 2020. U.S. Special Operations Command (SOCOM), which had long lobbied for the Light Attack/Armed Reconnaissance program, launched the Armed Overwatch initiative as a result.

=== AFSOC Armed Overwatch program ===
Following the demise of the Air Force's Light Attack/Armed Reconnaissance program, AFSOC decided to launch their own program to focus on obtaining and fielding a multi-mission aircraft to fill SOCOM's needs in uncontested airspace. Though the FY 2020 NDAA empowered SOCOM to take control of the existing Light Attack/Armed Reconnaissance program from the Air Force, Armed Overwatch is a completely independent effort. Unlike the Air Force's previous light attack efforts, which primarily sought a turboprop attack aircraft to conduct close air support missions for conventional ground forces, the Armed Overwatch program is focused on aircraft that can provide small special operations teams with the ISR and communication support currently provided by the U-28A Draco, as well as close air support.

In early March 2020, over 50 companies attended an industry day event to meet with SOCOM officials. Though SOCOM will not disclose which companies are submitting aircraft for the program, four (Sierra Nevada Corp., Textron, Air Tractor, and Leidos) have indicated that they are entering designs for consideration.

While the Pentagon's FY 2021 budget request sought $106 million to purchase an initial batch of 5 aircraft, COVID-related delays, as well as increased congressional scrutiny, have delayed the program. As of February 2021, AFSOC plans on conducting flying demonstrations in the summer of 2021, with procurement to begin in FY 2022.

On April 6, SOCOM released an "Armed Overwatch Program Other Transactional Authority (OTA) Agreement for a Prototype Project," detailing SOCOM's three-phase plan for evaluating entrants. Phase 1 requires interested vendors to submit a Notice of Intent and a "white paper" outlining their proposal. Phase 2 will consist of an "Offeror Deep Dive," during which a government evaluation team will visit each applicant contractor's facility and conduct a two-day, one-on-one session with company representatives. This information will be used for evaluating each program's likely lifetime cost, as well as each applicant's ability to produce aircraft meeting SOCOM requirements in a timely manner. Following Phase 1 and Phase 2, up to four favorably-evaluated vendors will be awarded a contract, granting the vendor up to $4,000,000 to participate in Phase 3 demonstrations. Phase 3 requires each applicant to provide flight demonstrations of their aircraft and detail their plan for delivering "up to 75 aircraft over a 5-7 year period." The Phase 3 flight demonstrations are currently scheduled for November 2020. SOCOM anticipates that the entire evaluation process will be complete "on or about April 1, 2021."

A draft of the 2021 NDAA approved by the Senate Armed Services Committee describes the Armed Overwatch project as a "poorly performing" program and prohibits the purchase of any aircraft as a part of the effort, while simultaneously blocking SOCOM from retiring the U-28A Draco or any other crewed ISR aircraft. Similarly, the House Armed Services Committee proposed cutting funding for the effort by $80,000,000. The House Committee on Appropriations, in its FY 2021 appropriations bill, proposed allocating an unspecified amount of funding for "a new start for SOCOM's Armed Overwatch Program."

In February 2021, AFSOC commander Lt. Gen. James Slife announced that, despite delays due to COVID and an increased amount of scrutiny from Congress, AFSOC would proceed with a flying demonstration of Armed Overwatch competitors in the summer of 2021. He indicated he was "cautiously optimistic" that AFSOC would collect the data they needed from the experiment, and be able to provide Congressional committees with information they needed to secure funding for procurement as early as FY 2022.

The Armed Overwatch program is the seventh effort by the US military to evaluate or purchase commercial, off-the-shelf turboprop aircraft for reconnaissance and attack duties over the past fourteen years: it follows the US Navy's Imminent Fury combat test (2008), the US Air Force's Light Attack/Armed Reconnaissance program (LAAR, 2009–2012), the Air National Guard's unnamed light attack experiments (2010), the US Navy's Combat Dragon II combat test (2015), US SOCOM's Light Attack Support for Special Operations program (LASSO, 2017), and the US Air Force's Light Attack Experiment (OA-X, 2017–2020).

=== Program of record ===
In April 2022, it was reported that Armed Overwatch had become an official Program of Record, as the FY2022 defense budget included $170,000,000 for the purchase of six aircraft. In his April 27 testimony to the Senate Armed Services Committee, Lt. Gen. Slife stated that SOCOM would decide on a source for these aircraft within "weeks", saying "this summer I expect to see a contract award." These initial aircraft, along with an additional nine requested as part of the FY2023 defense budget, will be part of a Low-Rate Initial Production batch, to be used mostly for operational testing and evaluation. SOCOM anticipates that these this will lead to a Full Rate Production contract award in Q4 of FY2024.

== Competitors ==
On May 14, 2021, SOCOM announced that five companies had been awarded contracts, totaling $19,200,000, to produce prototype aircraft for evaluation. By November of that year, SOCOM had narrowed its focus to just three designs.

Beechcraft AT-6E Wolverine

Based on Beechcraft's successful T-6 Texan II trainer aircraft, the AT-6 includes additional sensors, communications gear, and weapons hardpoints. The AT-6 was one of two finalists of the Light Attack/Armed Reconnaissance program. Though the only US AT-6 sales thus far have been for evaluation by the U.S. Air Force, hundreds of T-6A and T-6B trainers are in service with the U.S. Air Force and U.S. Navy, respectively.

Sierra Nevada Corp. MC-145B Wily Coyote

Essentially an upgraded C-145A Combat Coyote, itself a version of the Polish-manufactured PZL M28 Skytruck. While the C-145A is a STOL-capable light cargo aircraft operated in small numbers by AFSOC, the MC-145B adds sensors, communication equipment, and weapons, allowing it to complete ISR and CAS missions.

Air Tractor-L3Harris AT-802U Sky Warden

An armed variant of the successful AT-802 cropduster. 24 armed AT-802s have been delivered to the UAE, some of which have been loaned to the Yemeni Air Force and used in airstrikes.

=== Aircraft no longer under consideration ===
Leidos/Paramount USA/Vertex Aerospace Bronco II

Originally designed by Paramount Group in South Africa as the AHRLAC, the Bronco II is a new aircraft designed from the outset for close air support, rather than being modified from an existing design, like its competitors. Despite the name "Bronco II," the aircraft is a new design, not a descendant of its namesake, the OV-10 Bronco. The Bronco II has no known operators.

Sierra Nevada Corp./Embraer A-29

A U.S.-manufactured, modified version of the Embraer EMB 314 Super Tucano. The A-29 was one of two finalists of the Light Attack/Armed Reconnaissance program, and the winner of a U.S. contract to provide aircraft and training for the Afghan Air Force. The Nigerian Air Force has purchased 12 A-29s as well.

While Sierra Nevada Corp. initially indicated they would enter the A-29 for the Armed Overwatch program, the A-29 was not awarded a contract for a prototype. Sierra Nevada Corp. appears to have dropped their efforts to market the aircraft to AFSOC, focusing instead on their MC-145B.

MAG Aerospace MC-208 Guardian

Based on the Cessna 208 Caravan, the MC-208 Guardian is a multi-role variant fitted with additional surveillance sensors, avionics, weapon hardpoints, and weapon systems. The MC-208 Caravan can be armed with up to eight Hellfire missiles and as many as 28 Advanced Precision Kill Weapon Systems (APKWS) laser-guided rockets for smaller targets.

== Selection ==
The selection of the Air Tractor/L3Harris AT-802U Sky Warden system was announced in August 2022.
