= L3Harris OA-1K Skyraider II =

American light attack aircraft

OA-1K Skyraider II
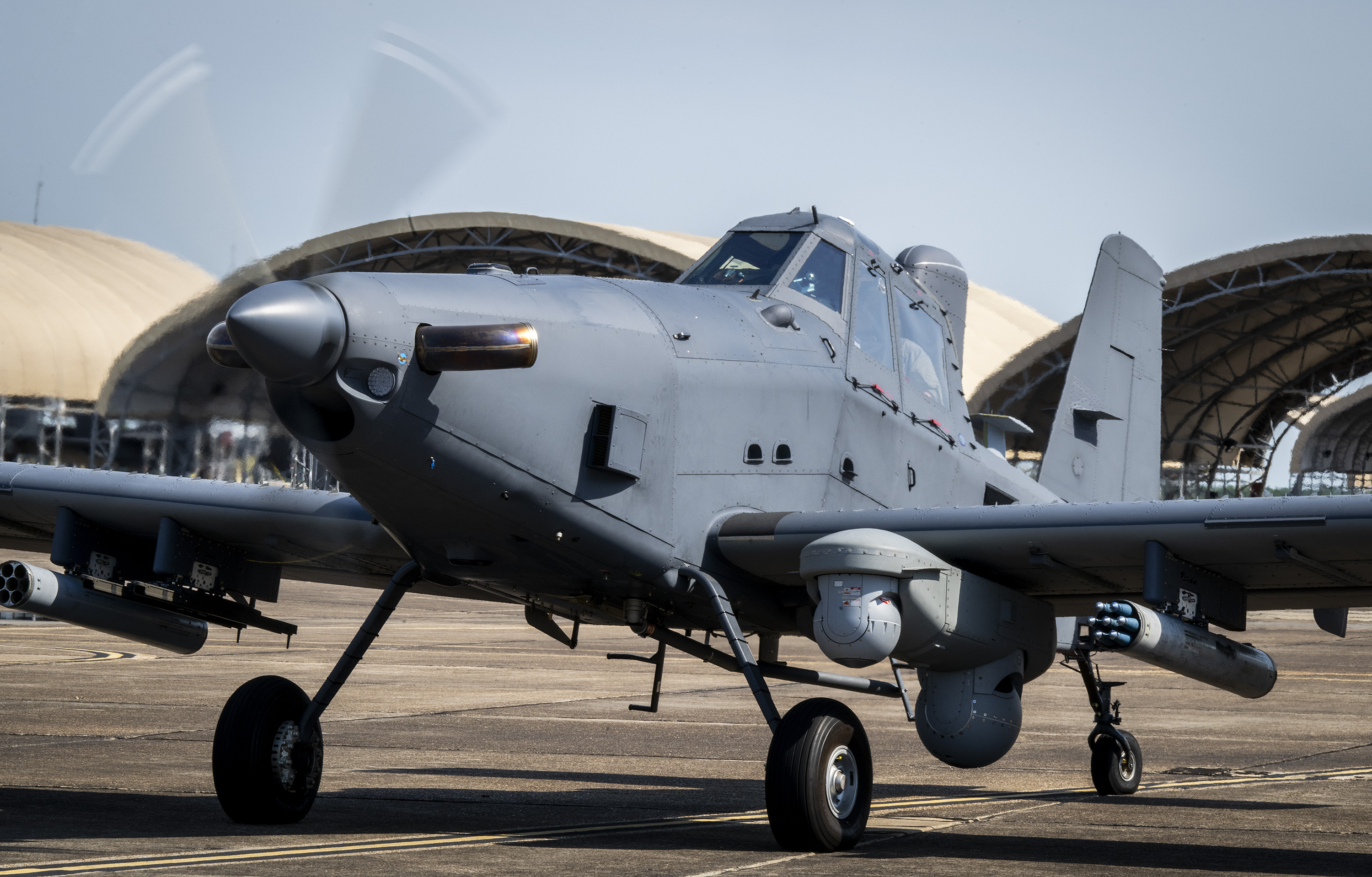
- An OA-1K Skyraider II prepares for take-off in June 2025, at Eglin Air Force Base, Florida.

General information
- Type: Attack and Surveillance aircraft
- National origin: United States
- Manufacturer: Air Tractor / L3Harris
- Status: In service and production
- Primary user: United States Air Force
- Number built: 18 as of May 2026

History
- Introduction date: 2025
- Developed from: Air Tractor AT-802

The Air Tractor L3Harris OA-1K Skyraider II (company name AT-802U Sky Warden) is an American fixed-wing single-engine counter-insurgency aircraft, configured for light attack and armed ISR (Intelligence, Surveillance and Reconnaissance). It is built by Air Tractor and L3Harris for the Armed Overwatch program of the United States Special Operations Command (SOCOM). It was developed from the Air Tractor AT-802, an American aircraft that is used for agriculture and fire-fighting and has been militarized in other programs.

The AT-802U Sky Warden won the Armed Overwatch trial. In August 2022, SOCOM announced a US$3 billion contract to purchase 75 aircraft by 2029.

== Design and development ==
The AT-802U Sky Warden was developed from the Air Tractor AT-802, for the Special Operations Command's Armed Overwatch trial. A version of the AT-802 has been used for years eradicating coca leaf crops, used in the production of illicit drugs, and as a result was already outfitted with lightweight composite ballistic armored engine compartment and cockpit, called a "bathtub." The windshield features flat ballistic glass panels. The cockpit is built of a steel tube frame design to act as a roll cage, and can support the entire weight of the aircraft.

The aircraft is not designed to fit ejection seats. The fuel lines and fuel tank are self-sealing and feature emergency fuel jettison. Restraints include a 5-point harness equipped with airbags. Essential flight controls are present in both the front and rear seats. The landing gear configuration differs from most modern aircraft in that it is a tail-wheel configuration, which is optimal for take-off and landing on austere and unimproved airstrips.

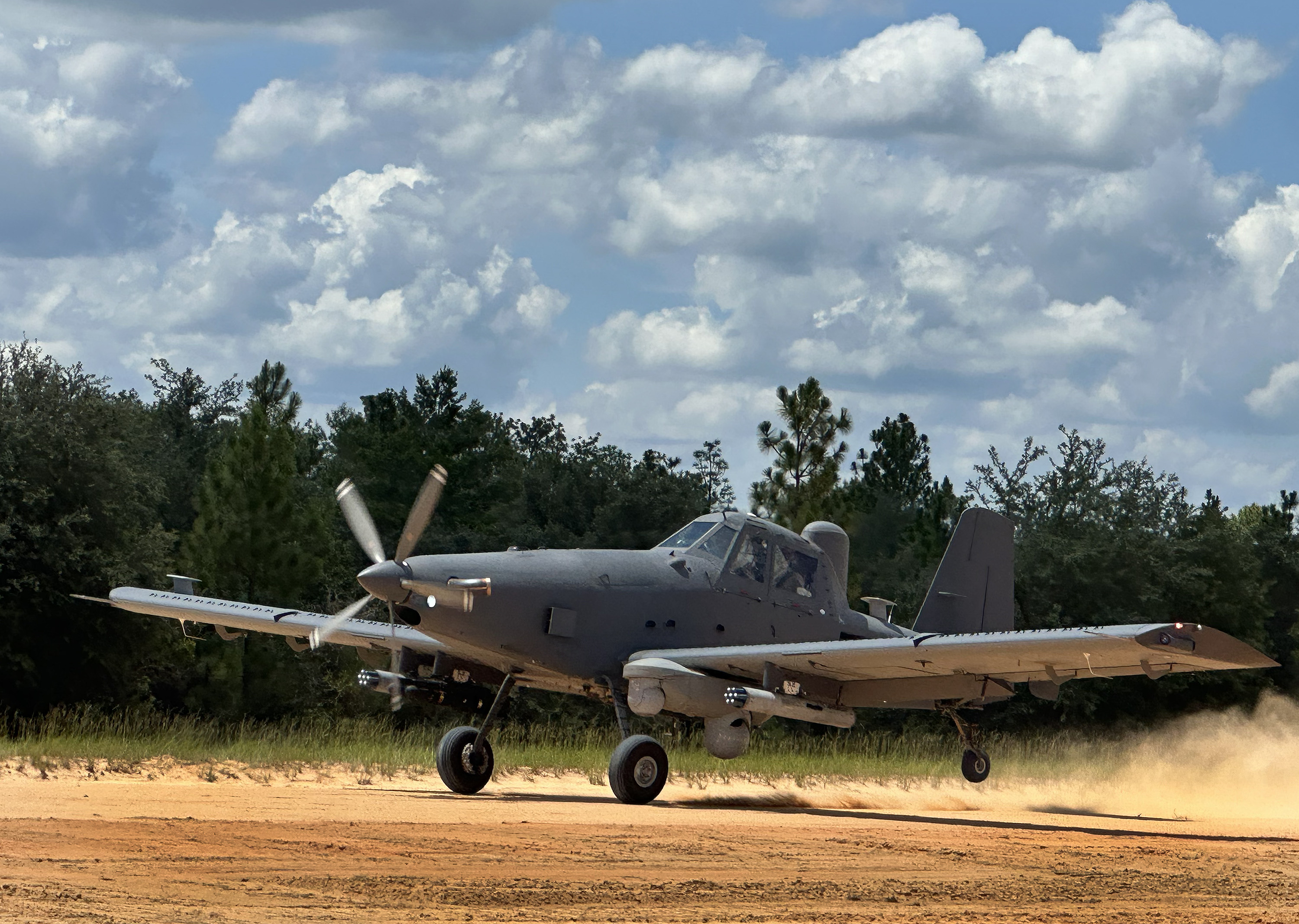
An OA-1K lands on a dirt path. The aircraft's design allows it to operate from austere and unimproved airfields.

The AT-802U is designed for expedient deployment and can be disassembled within a day to fit inside a single C-17 cargo aircraft. It can then be reassembled to mission-ready status within a single day.

In August 2022, Air Tractor and L3Harris were awarded a US$3 billion contract for 75 aircraft. The contract included an upfront payment of US$170 million, with the rest being paid out as the fleet is delivered. The aircraft is built in two stages. The airframe is built by Air Tractor in Olney, Texas, and the armor and weapons systems are added by L3Harris in Tulsa, Oklahoma. It will replace the U-28A Draco, an unarmed ISR aircraft, often used for counter-insurgency operations.

In late 2022, the AT-802U was officially designated the OA-1K. The designation implies the aircraft is a version of the unrelated and long retired A-1 Skyraider, another taildragger attack aircraft which was used by Air Force Special Operations Command (AFSOC) in the past. However this makes the designation non-systematic. In February 2025, AFSOC officials announced the aircraft will be called "Skyraider II" in U.S. Air Force service, after the A-1 Skyraider.

In December 2023, the Government Accountability Office (GAO) released a report urging the Department of Defense to slow down the program until SOCOM makes a better justification for so many planes. GAO suggested SOCOM needs a "substantially smaller" fleet of Sky Wardens, but did not recommend a number itself. In September 2024, it was revealed that in the previous March the order had been reduced from 75 to 62 aircraft.

== Operational history ==
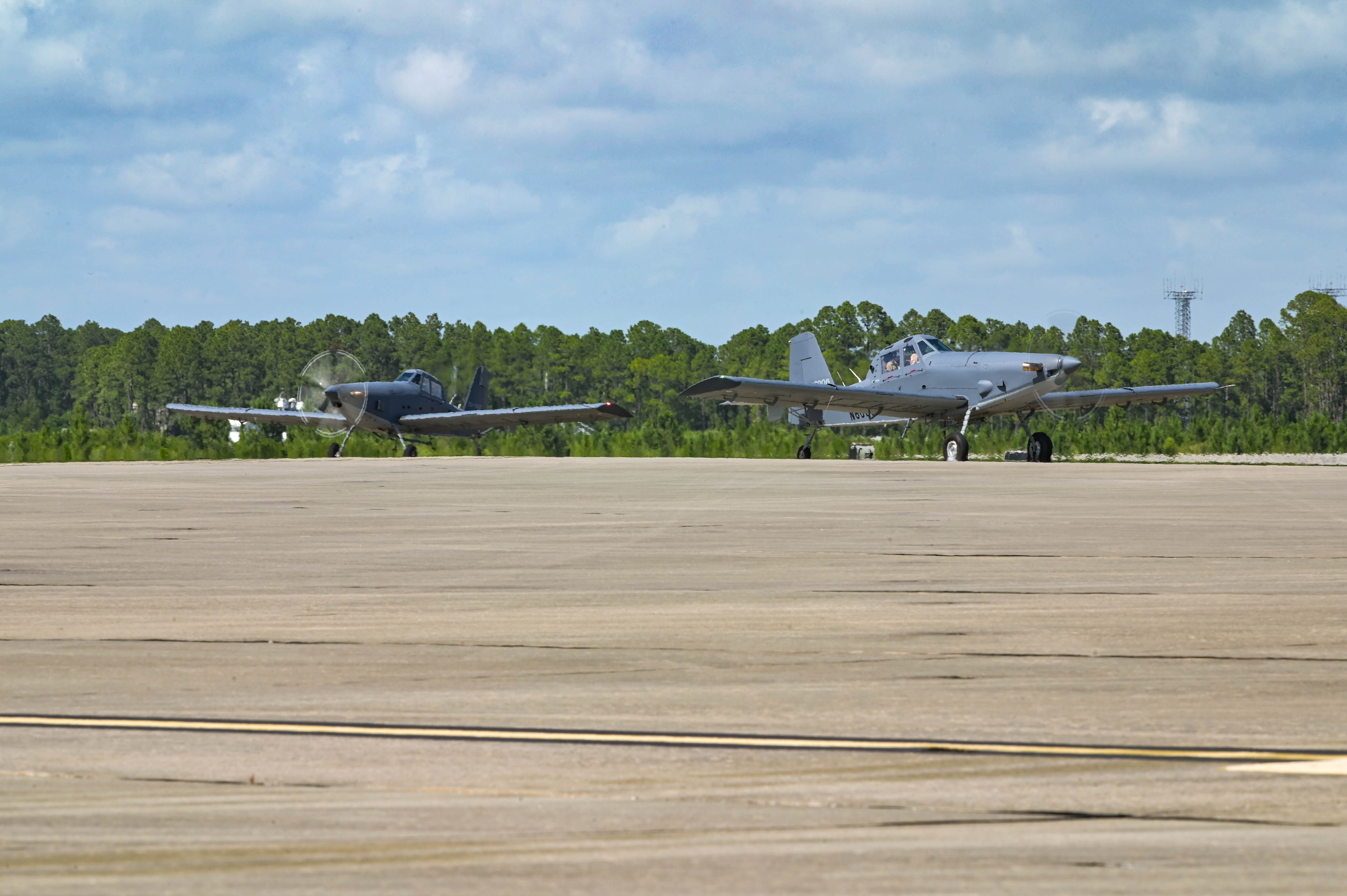
The two AT-802Us arrive at Hurlburt Field in June 2024.

In June 2024, two AT-802Us (Air Tractor aircraft unmodified by L3Harris) were delivered to Florida's Hurlburt Field to train test pilots and initial cadre before the OA-1K arrives. In July, training began. On July 29, one of the aircraft was moved to Will Rogers Air National Guard Base in Oklahoma City to train an initial cadre for the 17th Special Operations Squadron, the Formal Training Unit (FTU) for the OA-1K. The other was to follow later in the year.

In April 2025, the first missionized OA-1K was delivered to AFSOC in Hurlburt Field, Florida. Further airframes are set to be delivered to the 17th Special Operations Squadron, the aircraft's Formal Training Unit (FTU) at Will Rogers Air National Guard Base.

On 24 October 2025, an OA-1K of the 492nd Special Operations Wing made a crash landing into a field shortly after taking off from OKC Will Rogers International Airport. The 2 crew members exited safely without injuries. Official USAAF investigation revealed, that reason of the crash was a pilot mistake and miscommunication during training - Ordered by instructor, trainee shut off the main fuel valve instead of switching the wing tank/fuselage tank fuel selector - and didn't inform the instructor about the fact when discovering the mistake. The plane, worth US$18 million, was written off.

== Operators ==
AFSOC plans to base the OA-1K at Hurlburt Field, Cannon Air Force Base, Davis-Monthan Air Force Base and Will Rogers Air National Guard Base.

United States

- United States Air Force
  - Air Force Special Operations Command (AFSOC)
    - 492nd Special Operations Wing
      - 17th Special Operations Squadron. The OA-1K's Formal Training Unit (FTU), responsible for training new pilots and WSOs in association with the 185th Special Operations Squadron of the Oklahoma Air National Guard also stationed at Will Rogers Air National Guard Base.
  - Oklahoma Air National Guard
    - 137th Special Operations Wing
      - 185th Special Operations Squadron

== Specifications (AT-802U) ==
Data from Air Tractor Inc.

General characteristics

- Length: 37.5 ft (11.4 m)
- Wingspan: 59.25 ft (18.06 m)
- Height: 13 ft (4.0 m)
- Wing area: 401 sq ft (37.3 m^{2})
- Empty weight: 7,836 lb (3,554 kg) no armor or weapons
- Gross weight: 16,000 lb (7,257 kg)
- Fuel capacity: wing tanks: 380 U.S. gallons (1,400 L; 320 imp gal) and fuselage tanks: 360 U.S. gallons (1,400 L; 300 imp gal)
- Powerplant: 1 × Pratt & Whitney PT6A-67F turboprop, 1,600 hp (1,200 kW)
- Propellers: 5-bladed Hartzell Propeller Titanium Dome

Performance

- Maximum speed: 213 kn (245 mph, 394 km/h) at 10,000 feet (3,000 m) with no weapons
- Cruise speed: 180 kn (210 mph, 330 km/h) patrolling speed at 10,000 feet (3,000 m)
- Stall speed: 91 kn (105 mph, 169 km/h) at max gross weight
- Range: 1,303 nmi (1,499 mi, 2,413 km) full fuel at 8,000 feet (2,400 m)

Armament

- Hardpoints: 10 (2 centerline and 8 wing) , with provisions to carry combinations of:
  - Missiles: AGM-114 Hellfire, AGR-20 APKWS carried in LAU-131 A/A rocket pods
  - Bombs: GBU-12 Paveway II

Avionics

- WESCAM MX-15 and MX-20 EO-IR turrets, mounted together on underwing MMSS pods.
- AN/AAR-47 Missile Approach Warning System in the wingtips
- AN/ALE-47 Countermeasures dispensers in the underside of the wings

== See also ==
- Embraer EMB 314 Super Tucano
