= Wipaire =

American aircraft manufacturing and repair company

Wipaire is a third-generation family-owned American aircraft manufacturing and repair company, best known for its aircraft floats.

== History ==
The company was founded shortly after World War II by Ben Wiplinger, a veteran of the United States Army Air Forces. He returned to his native Minnesota and set up shop at South St. Paul Airport to convert surplus military aircraft (usually transport types; sometimes bombers) into civilian executive aircraft.

Wiplinger was an avid floatplane pilot, and he was familiar with the dominant line of light-aircraft floats of the era, EDO. He sought an EDO dealership, but was turned down. He formed Wipline, Inc. to fabricate his own line of aircraft floats. The production of Wipline floats commenced in 1960, though the first set wasn't sold until 1962. By 2013 the company had delivered over 2000 sets of floats, ranging in capacity from Cubs to Twin Otters. However, along with the manufacture and installation of floats, the company gradually returned to its original role of aircraft servicing, maintenance, modifications, painting and interior completions.

Bob Wiplinger, Ben's son, established Wipaire, Inc. in 1974. Both companies (Wipaire, Inc. and Wipline, Inc.) were combined in 1979 when Bob purchased Wipline, Inc. from Ben. Today, the company president is Chuck Wiplinger, Bob's son and Ben's grandson, who took over the role in 2011.

Until 2013 the company was based entirely in Minnesota. In late January 2013, it opened a floatplane service and repair facility at Leesburg International Airport in Lake County, Florida.

== Aerial firefighting modifications ==
A current example of the company's blended line of offerings is the Fire Boss, an Air Tractor AT-802F that is equipped to provide initial response to industrial or forest fires. Its amphibious floats can scoop 820 gallons of water as the plane flies low over a small lake, then the plane can dump the water on a fire. By January 2013, 50 such units were in service worldwide. As of May 2017, company advertising stated that over 80 units had been delivered and put into service globally.

== Aircraft modifications for float installations ==
In March 2015 Wipaire announced its new modification/re-engining program for existing Cessna 182 landplanes. The company developed a series of engine and propeller replacements, and obtained increases in maximum allowable weights, for the aircraft type. It will either upgrade a customer's existing airplane, or will procure used aircraft on the market and upgrade them for sale on the market.

== Airplane floats ==
As of 2017 the company's aircraft floats are made of aluminum. The company website lists eight different models of floats available for sale, most available in both seaplane or amphibious versions depending upon the needs of the buyer.
