= Counter-insurgency aircraft =

Light ground attack aircraft

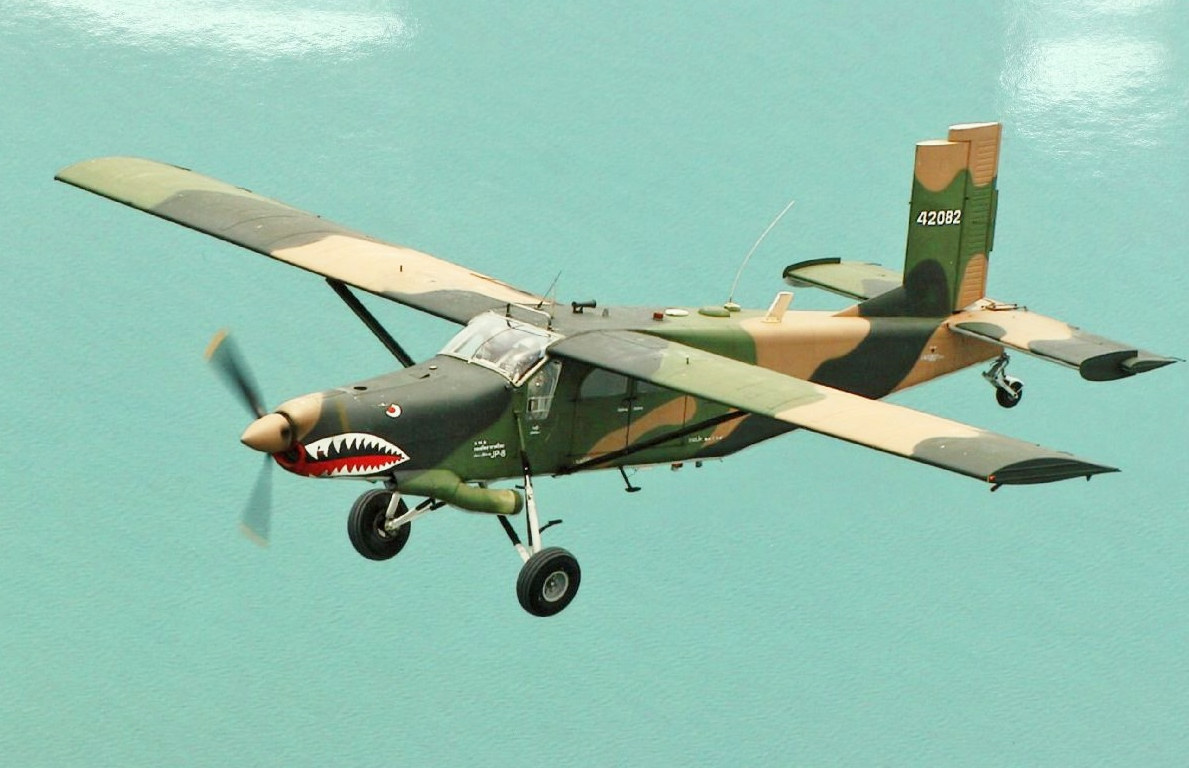
A Fairchild AU-23 Peacemaker in flight

Counter-insurgency aircraft are a specialized variety of military light attack aircraft, armed with aircraft artillery and/or portable rockets and designed for counter-insurgency (COIN) operations, armed reconnaissance, air escort of ground forces, and ground support against "low-intensity engagements"; usually irregular groups of insurgents.

== Roles ==
Some of the roles carried out by COIN aircraft include:

- Transportation in support of combatants and civilians alike, including casualty evacuation (CASEVAC)
- Intelligence gathering, surveillance, and reconnaissance
- Psychological operations (Psyops) through leaflet drops, loudspeakers, and radio broadcasts
- Air-to-ground attack against soft targets

For an aircraft—whether fixed-wing or rotary—to carry out all these roles effectively, it should have specification characteristics such as low loitering speed, long endurance, simplicity in maintenance, and the capability to perform short or vertical take-offs and landings from makeshift and roughly constructed runways.

== History ==
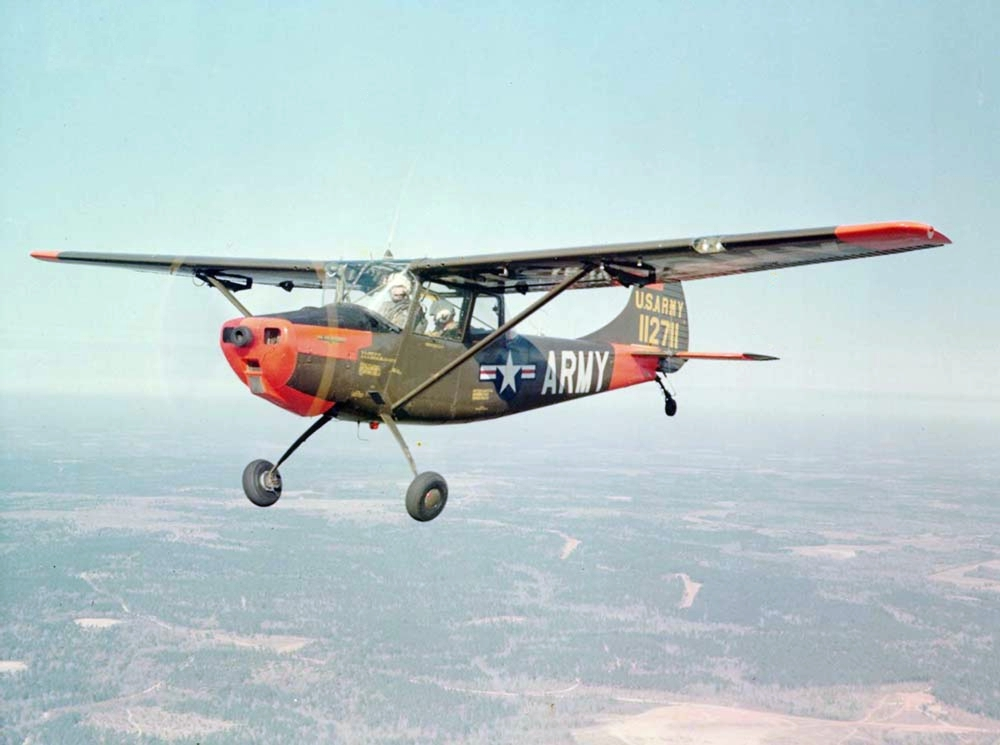
A Cessna O-1 Bird Dog in flight

=== Colonial times ===
The first use of COIN aircraft was in the 1920s and 1930s during some of the colonial wars, in nations such as Ethiopia and Iraq. The benefits offered by even a single aircraft in tasks such as reconnaissance or strafing small groups of individuals proved immeasurable.

As the British found in Iraq in the 1920s and from some encounters within the frontiers of Pashtunistan, aircraft stripped away many of the advantages that traditional insurgents had held. It also offered a way of inflicting direct and cost-effective retaliation on the communities that supported the guerrilla. Britain was the first to use COIN aircraft, as one of Royal Air Force (RAF) missions was policing British Empire by air. This solution was cheaper and quicker than using British Army troops to deal with trouble spots.

No special planes were developed; regular military aircraft were used. Fielding dual-role planes (bomber and transport) was not unusual for many air forces.

=== Postcolonial wars ===
The British Empire faced guerrillas in Africa, Malaya, and the Middle East. The RAF had a wide range of capable aircraft available to be used, making the development of new COIN aircraft types unnecessary. Interest in the export market did result in a few COIN aircraft such as the Strikemaster.

By the late 1950s, French air operations in the Algerian War was decidedly counter-insurgent in nature, with helicopters such as the Piasecki H-21 being used not only to carry infantry, but also for machine guns and rocket launchers on an ad hoc basis, to reach FLN guerilla positions on otherwise inaccessible mountain ridges and peaks. France created the Potez 75 ground-support and counter-insurgency aircraft. It proved its worth in a combat evaluation in Algerian War, and Potez received orders for 100 from the French Army, butit did not survive budget cuts.

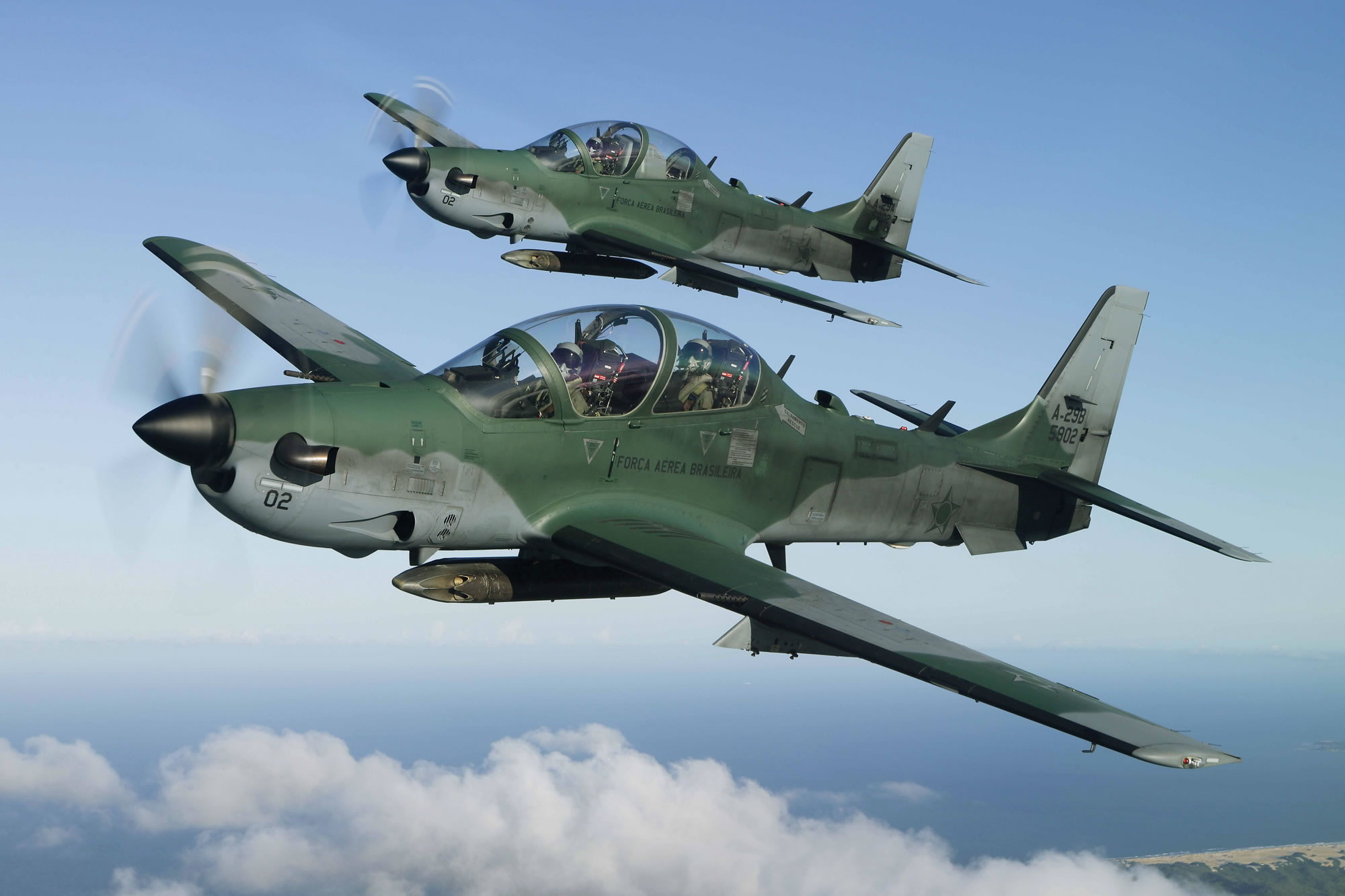
An EMB 314 Super Tucano in flight

In the early 1960s, US planners clearly saw the need for a plane in the guerrilla wars in Asia or Africa. As a consequence, the U.S. Army tested an armed version of the T-37 Tweet, A4D-2N Skyhawk, and Fiat G.91. The tests were good, but the Army was prohibited from operating fixed-wing aircraft in combat. As late as the Vietnam War, COIN missions were flown by existing planes and helicopters, sometimes hastily adapted for the role, notable examples being the North American T-28 Trojan and Douglas A-1 Skyraider. Eventually, as the U.S. budget allowed it, dedicated, specialized COIN aircraft began to be produced for Vietnam War. Other countries adapted existing training planes to COIN and light attack. Examples include:

- BAC Strikemaster
- Cessna A-37 Dragonfly
- Cessna O-1 Bird Dog
- Cessna O-2 Skymaster
- EMB 312 Tucano
- EMB 314 Super Tucano
- Fairchild AU-23
- Fletcher FD-25
- FMA IA 58 Pucará
- Grumman OV-1 Mohawk
- Helio Stallion
- OV-10 Bronco
- SIAI-Marchetti SF.260
- Soko J-20 Kraguj
- TAI Hürkuş

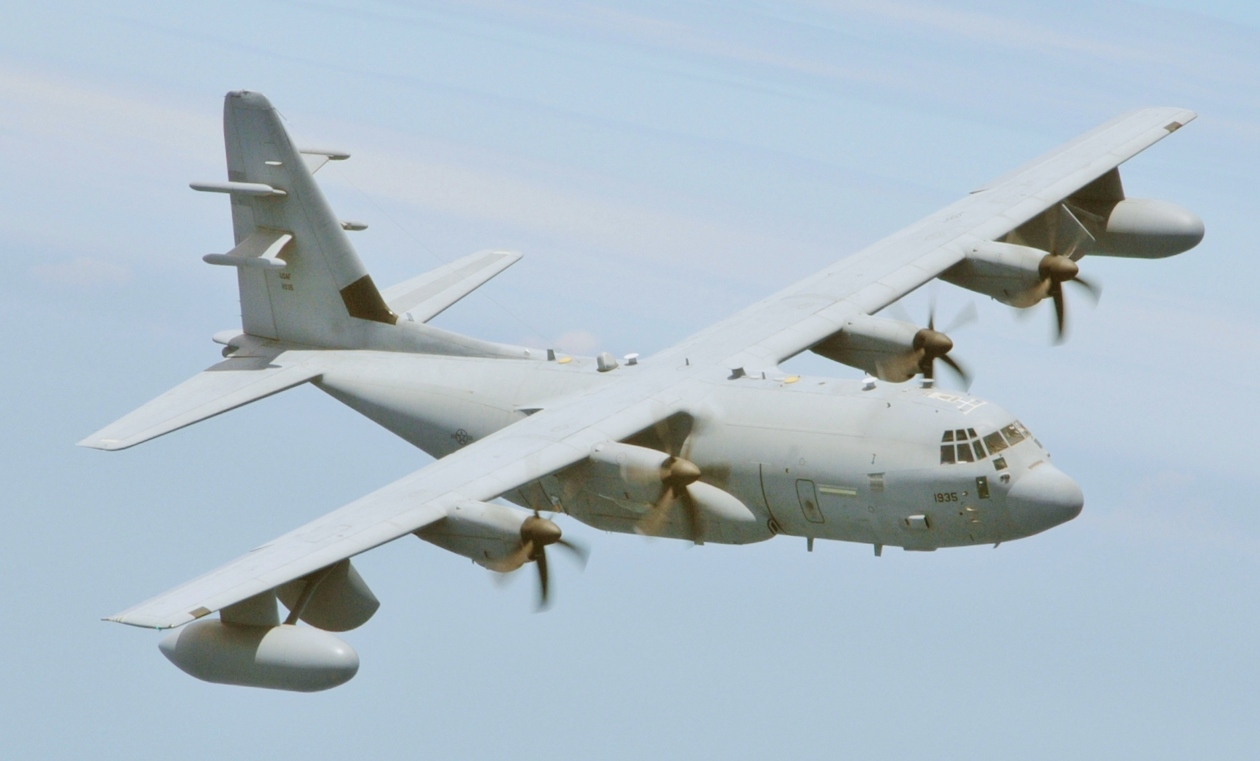
EC-130J Commando Solo which is used for PSYOP warfare

A new approach of COIN planes were the gunships created by the U.S. A gunship is an aircraft having laterally mounted heavy armaments (i.e. firing to the side) to attack ground or sea targets. These gunships were configured to circle the target instead of performing strafing runs. Such aircraft have their armament on one side harmonized to fire at the apex of an imaginary cone formed by the aircraft and the ground when performing a pylon turn (banking turn).

In the Vietnam War, the old Douglas C-47 Skytrain transport was successfully modified by the United States Air Force (USAF) with side-firing Miniguns for circling attacks. The later and larger Lockheed AC-130 became a notable gunship in U.S. military aviation. These heavily armed aircraft used a variety of weapon systems, including 7.62 mm GAU-2/A Miniguns, 20 mm (0.787 in) M61 Vulcan six-barrel rotary cannons, 25 mm (0.984 in) GAU-12/U Equalizer five-barreled rotary cannons, 30 mm Mk44 Bushmaster II chain guns, 40 mm (1.58 in) L/60 Bofors autocannons, and 105 mm (4.13 in) M102 howitzers. The Douglas AC-47 Spooky, the Fairchild AC-119, and the AC-130 Spectre/Spooky, were vulnerable, and meant to operate only after achieving air superiority. Smaller gunship designs, such as the Fairchild AU-23 Peacemaker and the Helio AU-24 Stallion, were also designed by the U.S. during the Vietnam War. These aircraft were meant to be cheap and easy to fly and maintain and were to be given to friendly governments in Southeast Asia to assist with COIN operations, eventually seeing service with the Khmer National Air Force, Royal Thai Air Force, and Republic of Vietnam Air Force, as well as limited use by the USAF.

== See also ==
- Army cooperation aircraft
- Dive bomber
- Emergency fighter
- Gunship
- Light Attack/Armed Reconnaissance (LAAR) Program
