= Pivotal altitude =

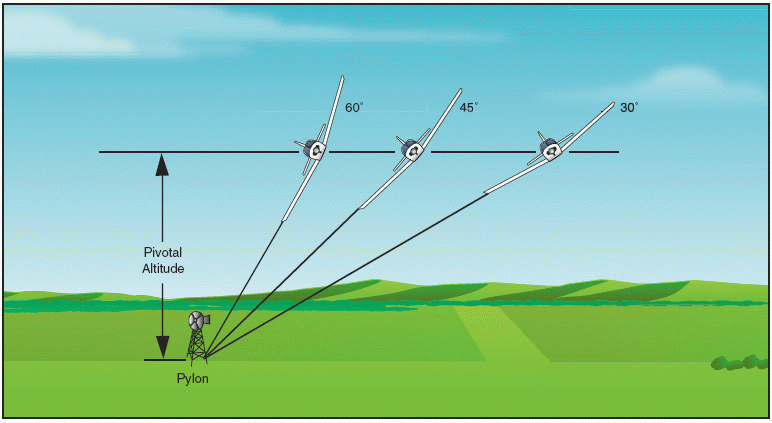
At the pivotal altitude, a turn can be made at any distance from the pylon with appropriate bank, and the pylon will appear to remain stationary

Pivotal altitude is the height for a given ground speed at which the line of sight from the cockpit directly parallel to the lateral axis of the aircraft will remain stationary on an object on the ground. A good rule of thumb for estimating the pivotal altitude is to square the groundspeed, then divide by 15 (if the groundspeed is in miles per hour) or divide by 11.3 (if the groundspeed is in knots), and then add the mean sea level (MSL) altitude of the ground reference. The pivotal altitude is the altitude at which, for a given groundspeed, the projection of the visual reference line to the pylon appears to pivot. The pivotal altitude does not vary with the angle of bank unless the bank is steep enough to affect the groundspeed.

A rule of thumb for calculating the pivotal altitude H in feet, given the speed in knots $v$, is

$$H = \frac {v^2}{11.3}$$
