= Air Tractor AT-400 =

American agricultural aircraft family

AT-400 family
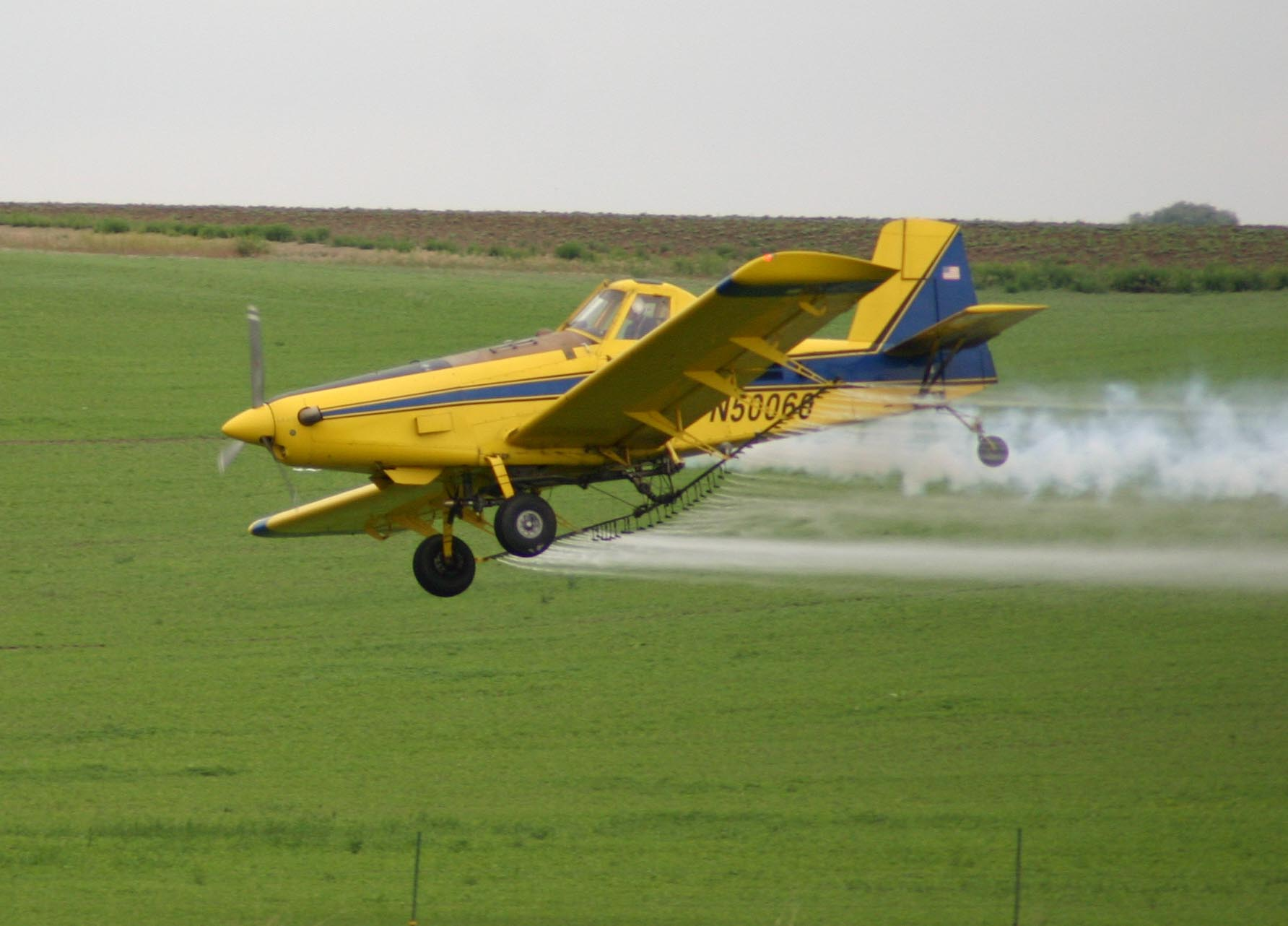
- An AT-402 in operation, spraying a field in Washington State

General information
- Type: Agricultural aircraft
- Manufacturer: Air Tractor
- Status: Active, in production

History
- Manufactured: 1979-present
- Introduction date: 1980
- First flight: 1979

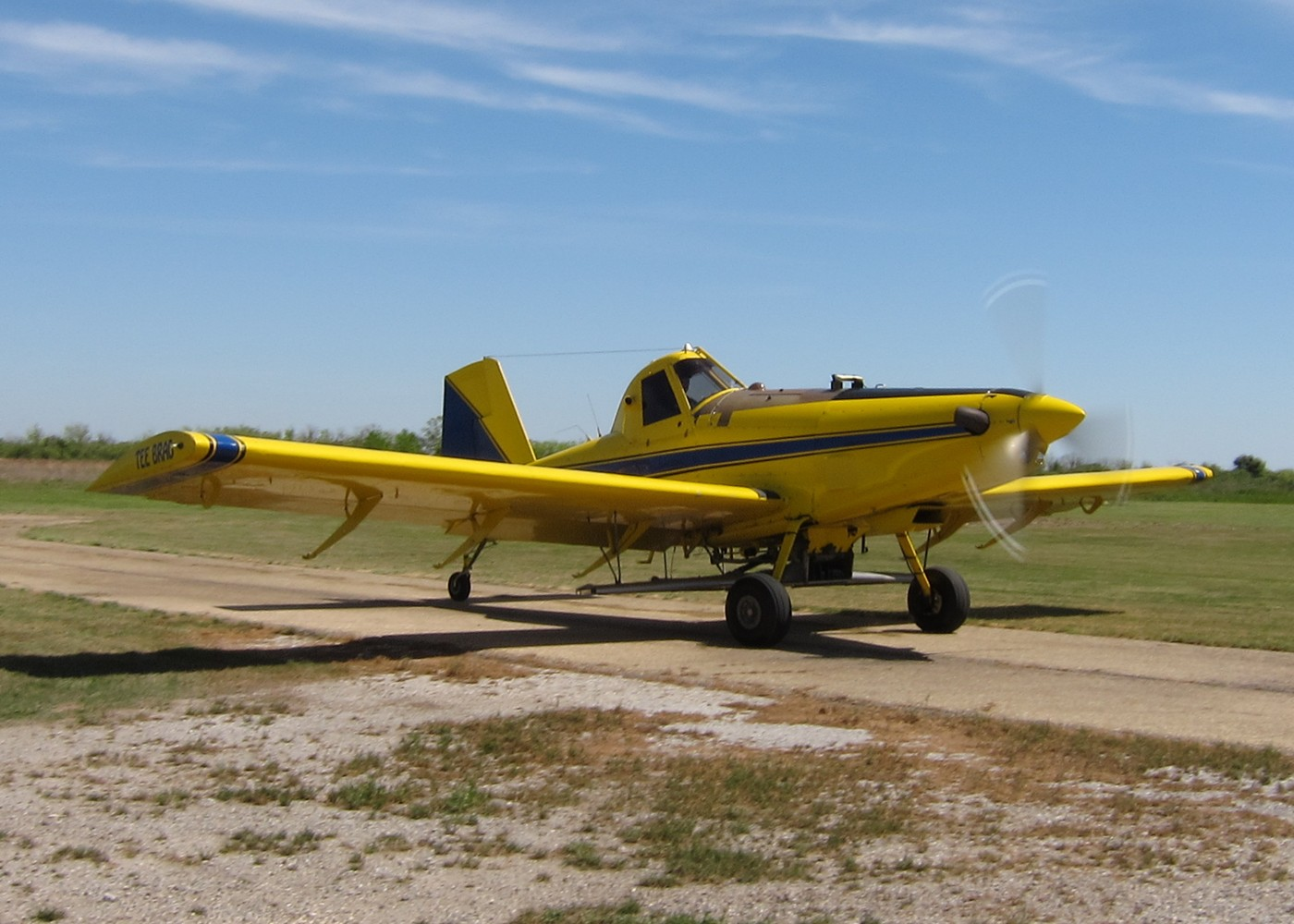
An AT-400 on the runway

The Air Tractor AT-400 is a family of agricultural aircraft that first flew in the United States in September 1979. Type certification was awarded to Air Tractor in April 1980. Of low-wing monoplane taildragger configuration, they carry a chemical hopper between the engine firewall and the cockpit.

== Variants ==
- AT-400 - AT-301 with 680 shp (507 kW) Pratt & Whitney Canada PT6A-15AG engine and 400 US gal (1,510 L) hopper. Short-span (45 ft 1¼ in (13.75 m)) wings. 72 built.
- AT-400A - AT-400 with 550 hp (410 kW) Pratt & Whitney Canada PT6A-20 engine. 14 built.
- AT-401 - AT-301 with longer-span wings and 400 US gal (1,510 L) hopper, powered by 600 hp (447 kW) Pratt & Whitney R-1340 radial engine. 168 built.
- AT-401A - AT-401 with PZL-3S engine. One built.
- AT-401B -Improved revision of AT-401, with revised wingtips and further increased span (51 ft 1¼ in (15.57 m)). 69 built by December 2001.
- AT-402 - AT-401 with Pratt & Whitney Canada PT6A-15 engine. 68 built.
- AT-402A - low cost version of AT-401B, with Pratt & Whitney Canada PT6A-20 engine. 103 built by December 2001.
- AT-402B - improved version of AT-402, with revised wingtips and increased span of AT-401B. 31 built by December 2001.

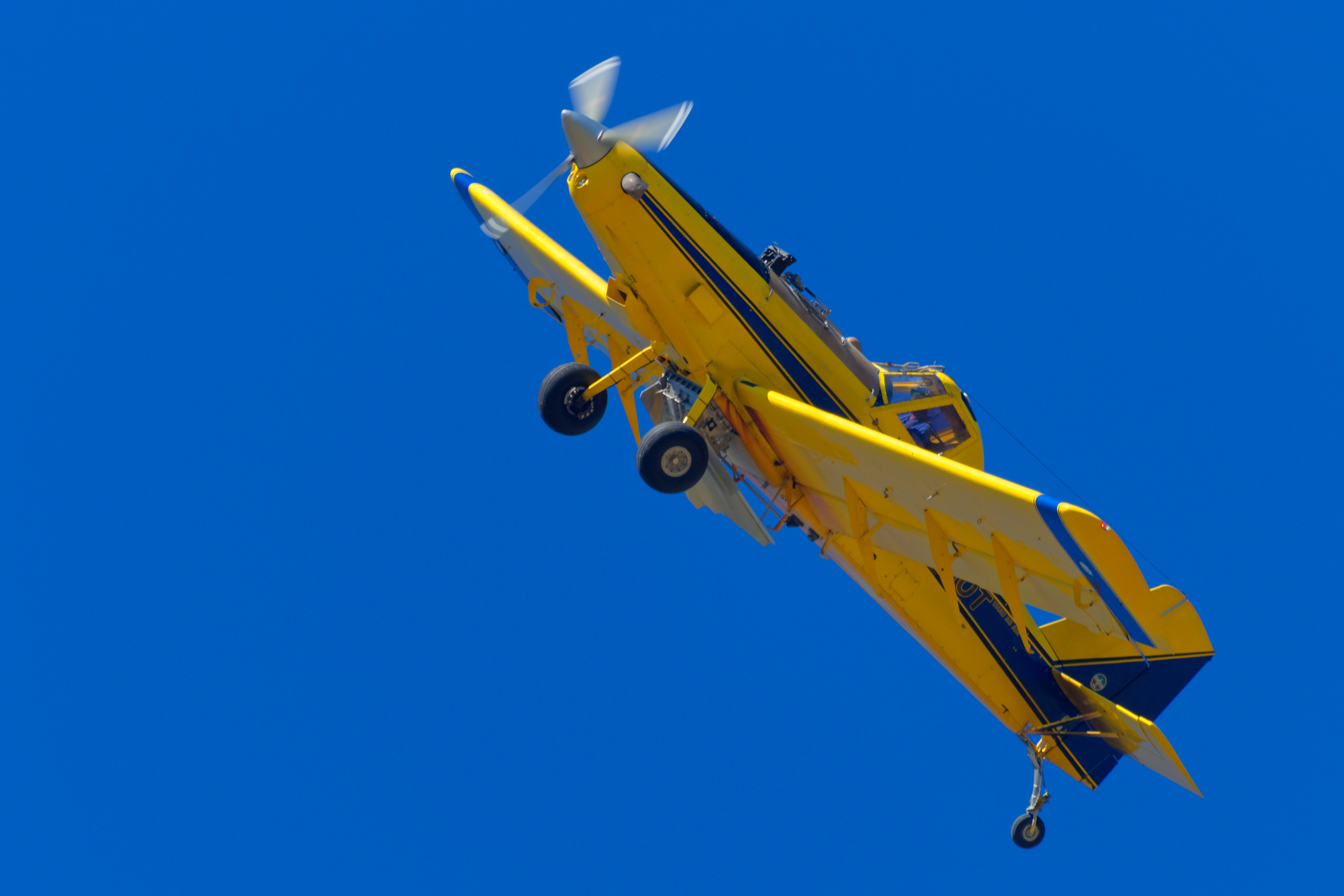
Air tractor AT402B in New Zealand

== Aircraft on display ==
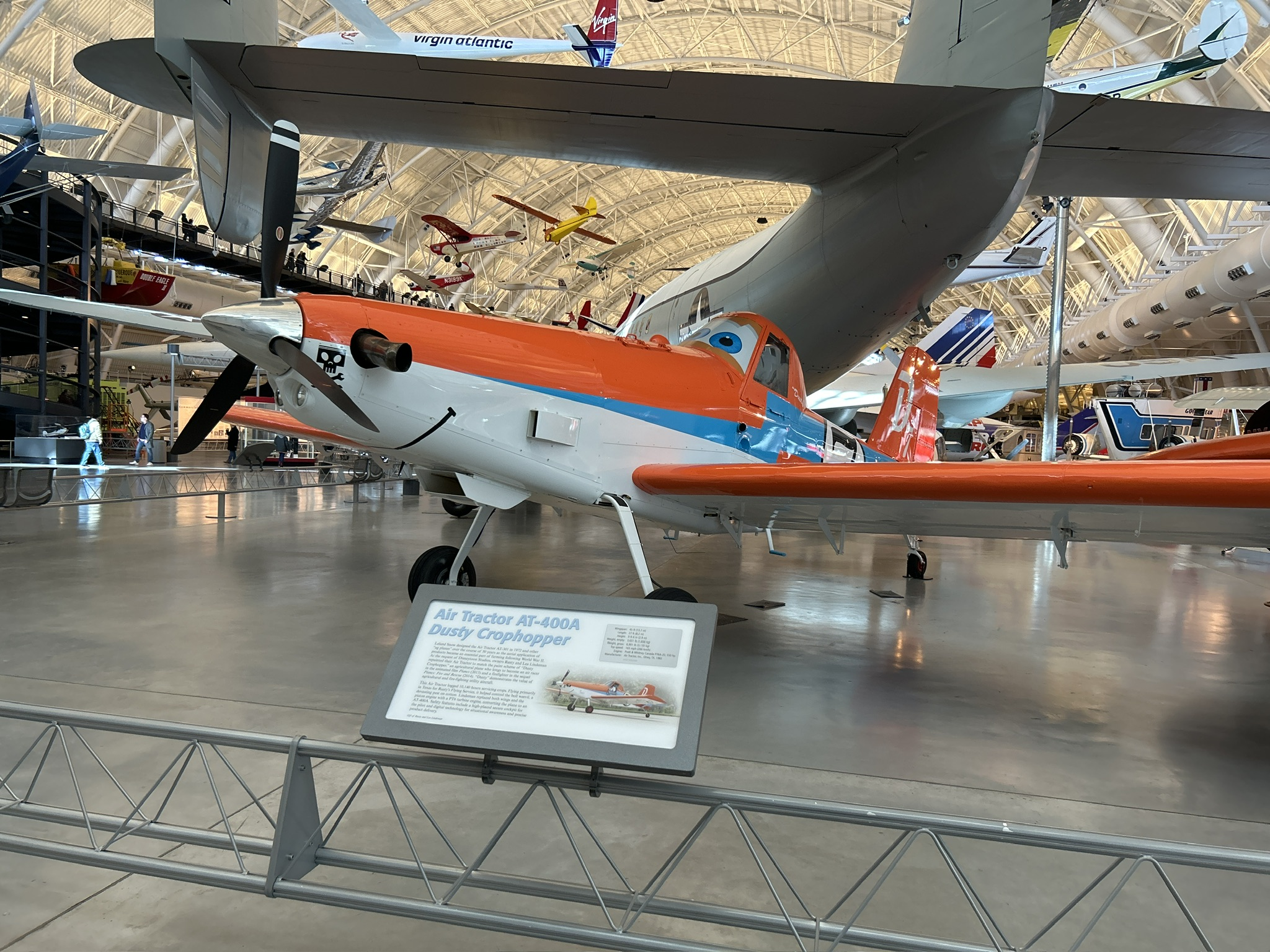
AT-400A N3159D on display at the Steven F. Udvar-Hazy Center

- AT-400A N3159D is on display at the Steven F. Udvar-Hazy Center in Chantilly, Virginia. It is decorated in a livery depicting Dusty Crophopper from the 2013 animated film Planes, having been given the livery at the request of Disneytoon Studios prior to its acquisition by the museum.

== Specifications (AT-401) ==
Data from Janes's All The World's Aircraft 1993-94.

General characteristics

- Crew: 1
- Capacity: 400 US gal (330 imp gal; 1,500 L) hopper
- Length: 27 ft 0 in (8.23 m)
- Wingspan: 49 ft 1 1/4 in (14.97 m)
- Height: 8 ft 6 in (2.59 m)
- Wing area: 294.0 sq ft (27.31 m^{2})
- Aspect ratio: 8.20:1
- Airfoil: NACA 4415
- Empty weight: 4,135 lb (1,876 kg)
- Max takeoff weight: 7,860 lb (3,565 kg)
- Powerplant: 1 × Pratt & Whitney R-1340 radial engine, 600 hp (450 kW)

Performance

- Maximum speed: 156 mph (251 km/h, 136 kn) at sea level
- Cruise speed: 120–140 mph (190–230 km/h, 100–120 kn) (typical working speed)
- Stall speed: 61 mph (98 km/h, 53 kn) at 6,000 lb (2,700 kg) (max. landing weight) (flaps down)
- Range: 630 mi (1,010 km, 550 nmi)
- Rate of climb: 1,100 ft/min (5.6 m/s)

== See also ==
Related development

- AT-300
- AT-501
- AT-602
- AT-802
