= Air Tractor AT-602 =

Agricultural aircraft

AT-602
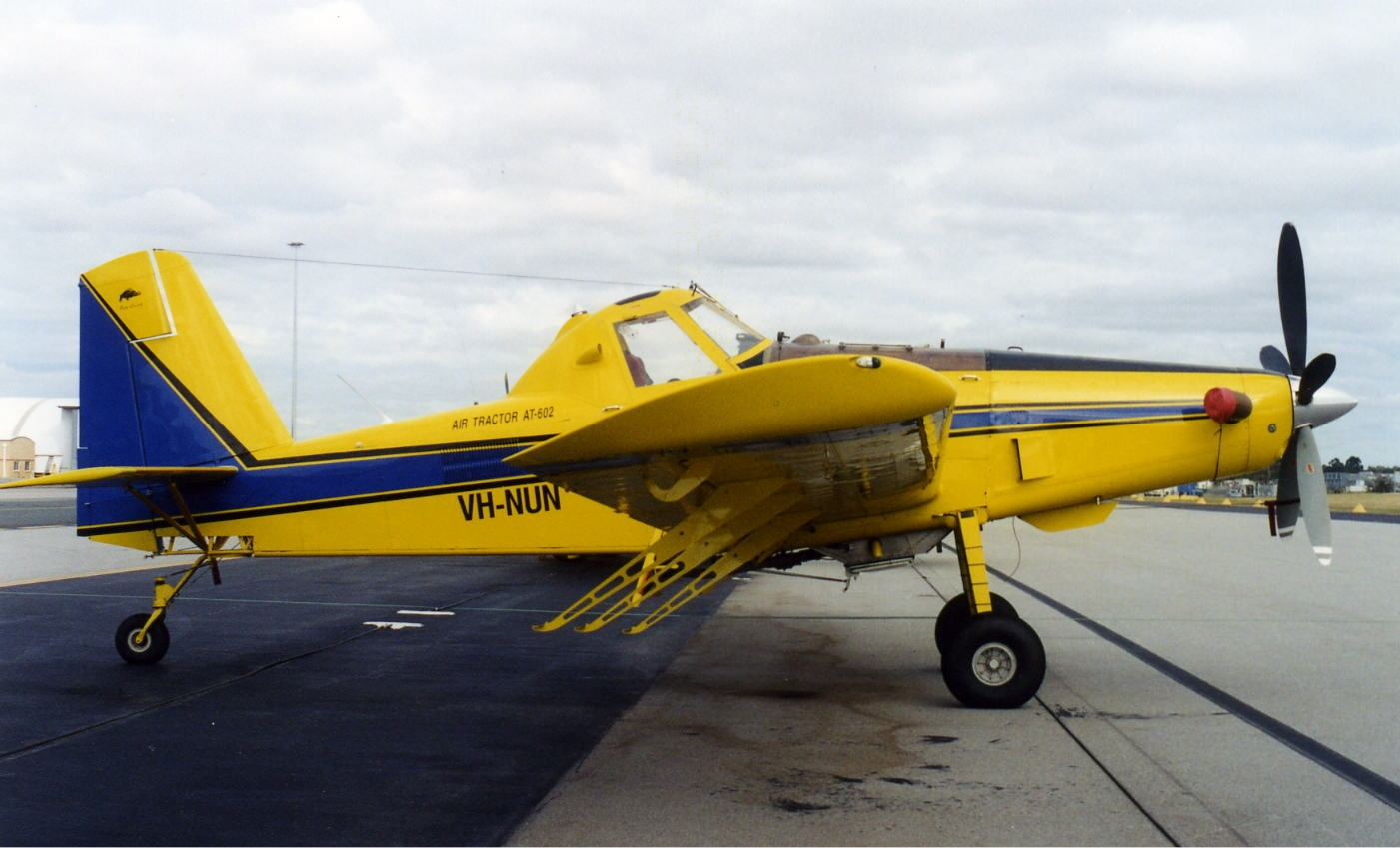
- AT-602 at Perth Airport (early 2000s)

General information
- Type: Agricultural aircraft
- Manufacturer: Air Tractor
- Status: Active, in production

History
- Manufactured: 1995–present
- Introduction date: 1996
- First flight: 1 December 1995

The Air Tractor AT-602 is an agricultural aircraft manufactured by Air Tractor Inc, that first flew in the United States on 1 December 1995. Of monoplane low-wing, taildragger configuration, it carries a chemical hopper between the engine firewall and the cockpit. It was designed to fill a gap in the Air Tractor range, between the AT-500 series with a 500 US gal (1,890 L) capacity and the AT-802 with a 810 US gal (3,070 L) capacity.

== Operators ==
Australia

- Dunn Aviation (Western Australia) – 2 x AT-602s

Mongolia

- Thomas Air LLC (Mongolia) – AT-602

== Specifications ==
Data from Jane's All The World's Aircraft 2003–2004

General characteristics

- Crew: one pilot
- Capacity: 630 US gal (520 imp gal; 2,400 L) chemicals
- Length: 34 ft 2 in (10.41 m)
- Wingspan: 56 ft 0 in (17.07 m)
- Height: 11 ft 1 in (3.38 m)
- Wing area: 336.0 sq ft (31.22 m^{2})
- Aspect ratio: 9.3:1
- Empty weight: 5,600 lb (2,540 kg)
- Gross weight: 12,500 lb (5,670 kg)
- Powerplant: 1 × Pratt & Whitney PT6A-60AG turboprop , 1,050 hp (783 kW)

Performance

- Maximum speed: 198 mph (319 km/h, 172 kn)
- Cruise speed: 150 mph (241 km/h, 130 kn)
- Stall speed: 87 mph (140 km/h, 76 kn) (flaps down)
- Never exceed speed: 217 mph (349 km/h, 189 kn)
- Range: 600 mi (970 km, 520 nmi) at 8,000 ft (2,400 m), econ. cruise speed
- Rate of climb: 650 ft/min (3.3 m/s)

== Operations ==
Dunn Aviation, the largest agricultural operator in Western Australia, used an AT-602 for aerial firefighting in mountainous terrain on the Australian east coast in 2000, working alongside an AT-802 operated by Pays Air Service. A reference directory lists more than 110 AT-602s as built.

== See also ==
Aircraft of comparable role, configuration, and era

- AT-300
- AT-400
- AT-501
- AT-802
