= Air Tractor AT-1002 =

American agricultural and fire-fighting aircraft

AT-1002

General information
- Type: Agricultural / Fire-fighting aircraft
- National origin: United States
- Manufacturer: Air Tractor
- Status: In production

History
- First flight: 25 November 2009

The Air Tractor AT-1002 is a single-seat agricultural and firefighting aircraft made by American aircraft manufacturer Air Tractor. The aircraft is the company's largest, with a takeoff and landing weight of 20,000 pounds and useful load of 10,800 pounds. The aircraft can carry over 1,060 gallons of fire retardant or 335 gallons of agricultural spray.

The aircraft is an advanced version of the Air Tractor AT-802 and is designed to be able to carry a higher payload than its predecessors. Its main role is to replace aging or retired aircraft.

The aircraft first flew in 2009. Deliveries of the type began in 2010. In 2013, it served as a testbed for the Electronics International MVP-50T Engine Analyzer.

In 2022, it was revealed that the 1002 model was undergoing a redesign, and initial prototypes were released.

== Prototypes ==
The first AT-1002A prototype, serial number 1002A-0001 and registered N4285K, was registered to Air Tractor Inc. of Olney, Texas, on 25 December 2009, and is listed with a Pratt & Whitney Canada PT6A-67F turboprop. Australian Aviation reported in 2010 that the PT6A-67F could provide up to 1,600 horsepower, that the aircraft had a useful load of 10,800 lb (4,900 kg), and that certification was anticipated that year.

A second AT-1002A, serial number 1002A-0002 and registered N22AT, was registered to Air Tractor on 24 January 2024 as a 2024-built aircraft. Its FAA record shows an experimental airworthiness certificate dated 27 August 2024 for research and development, consistent with the type's redesign program.
