= Pratt & Whitney Canada PT9 =

Turboprop aircraft engine by Pratt & Whitney Canada

PT9
- Type: Turboprop
- National origin: Canada
- Manufacturer: Pratt & Whitney Canada

The Pratt & Whitney Canada PT9 is a turboprop aircraft engine under development by Pratt & Whitney Canada. Announced on 21 October 2026, it is intended to supplement the company's existing PT6 and PW100 models. Its design power of 1,700 to 2,300 shaft horsepower is claimed to reduce fuel consumption by 20% and increase power by 33%. Production is planned to take place in Lethbridge, Alberta.

== Design ==
The PT9 is reported to have a maximum power between 1,700 and 2,300 shaft horsepower, and be able to integrate with future hybrid-electric power systems. Like the PT6, the PT9 will feature a reverse flow combustor in the same diameter casing, as well as electronic control through a single power lever.

== Development ==
The PT9 was first seen in filings with the Federal Aviation Administration in 2025, and received certification with Transport Canada on 1 October 2026.

== Specifications ==
==== General characteristics ====
- Type: Turboprop
- Length:
- Diameter:
- Dry weight:

==== Components ====
- Compressor:

==== Performance ====
- Maximum power output:

== See also ==
Related development

- Pratt & Whitney Canada PT6

Comparable engines

- Garrett TPE331
- General Electric Catalyst
- Walter M601

Related lists

- List of aircraft engines
