= Air Tractor =

US manufacturer of agricultural aircraft

Air Tractor, Inc.
- Industry: Aerospace
- Founded: 1974
- Founder: Leland Snow
- Headquarters: Olney, Texas, United States
- Website: airtractor.com

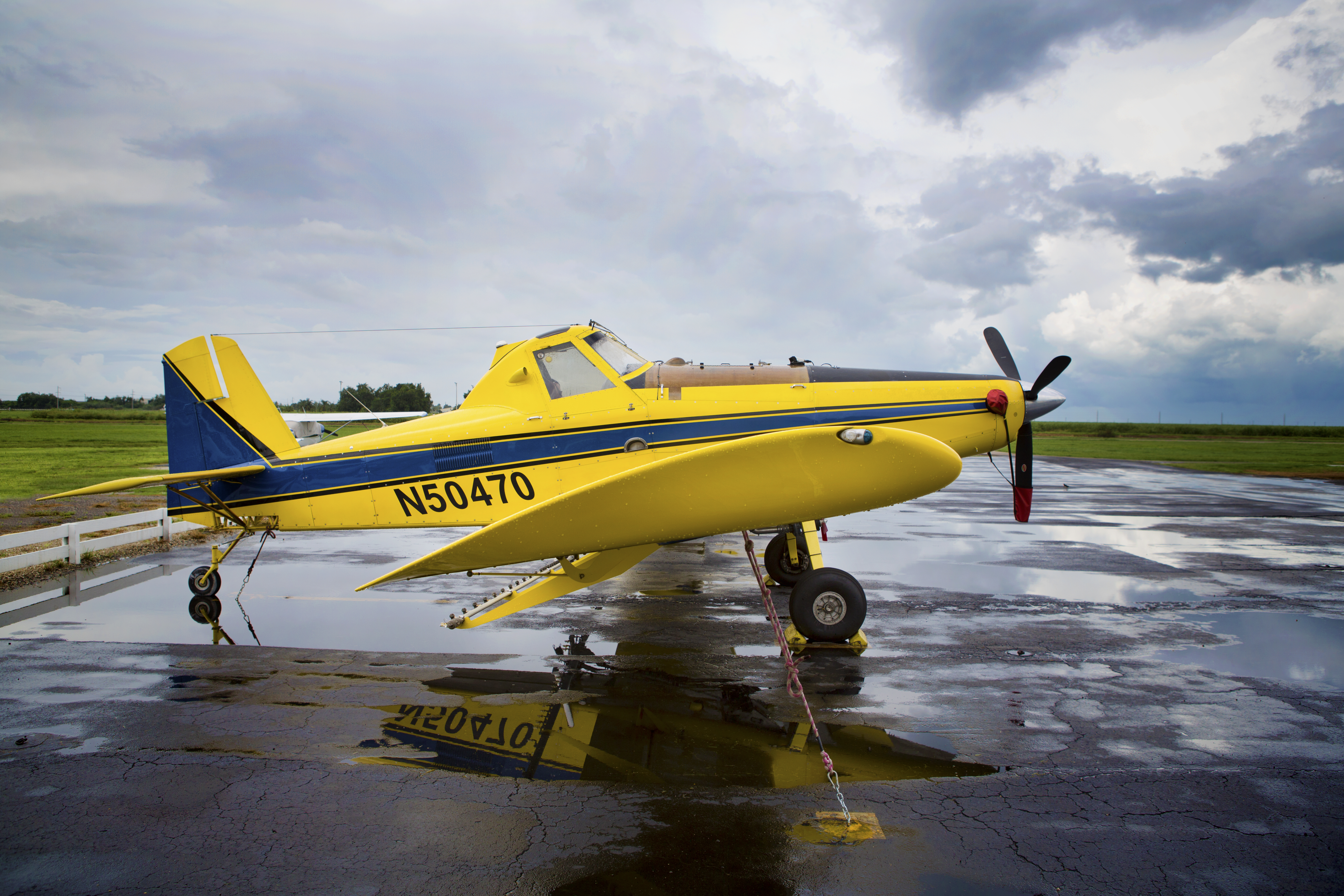
An AT-502B on the ramp at Belle Glade Airport

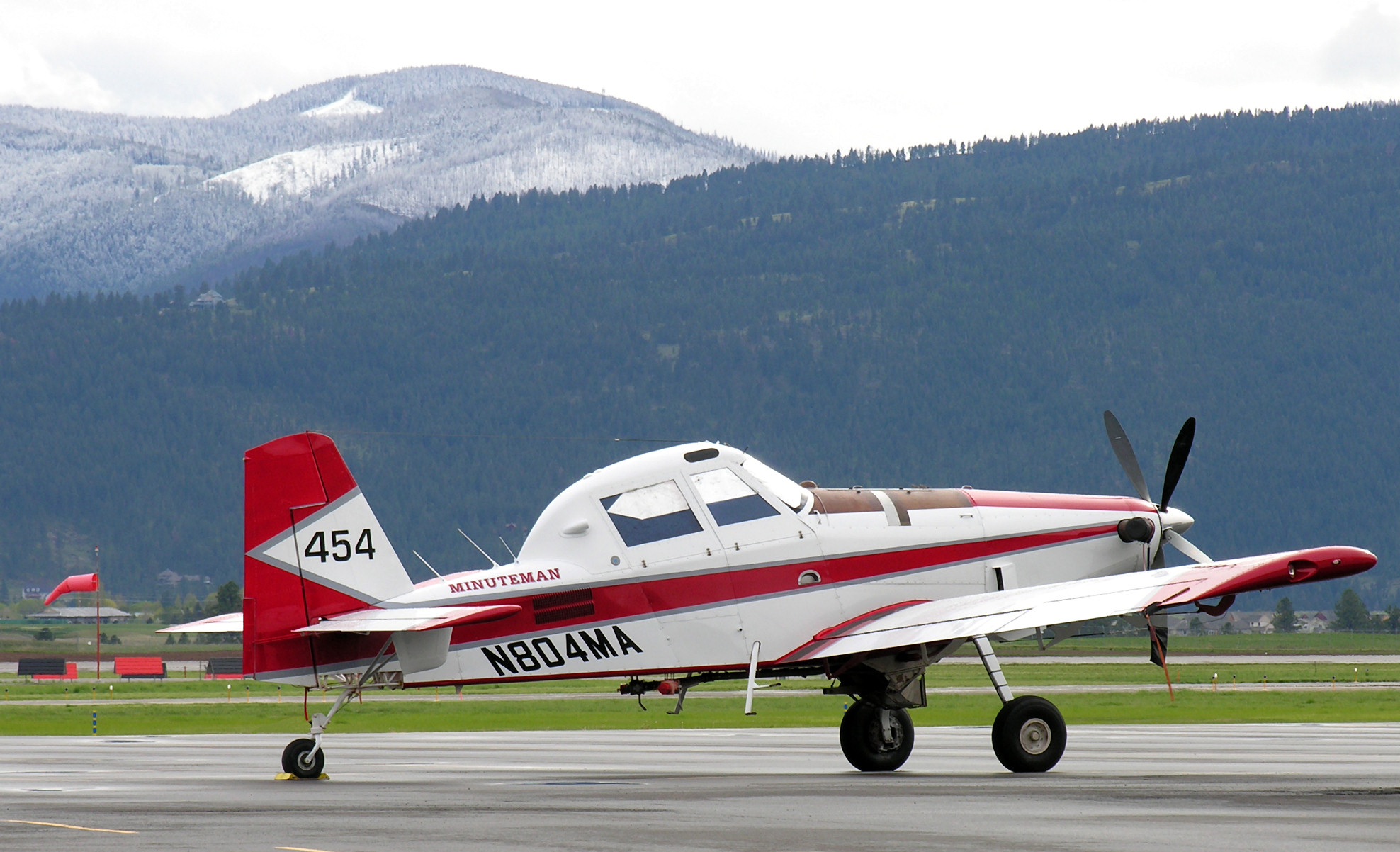
A two-seat AT-802 in Missoula, Montana

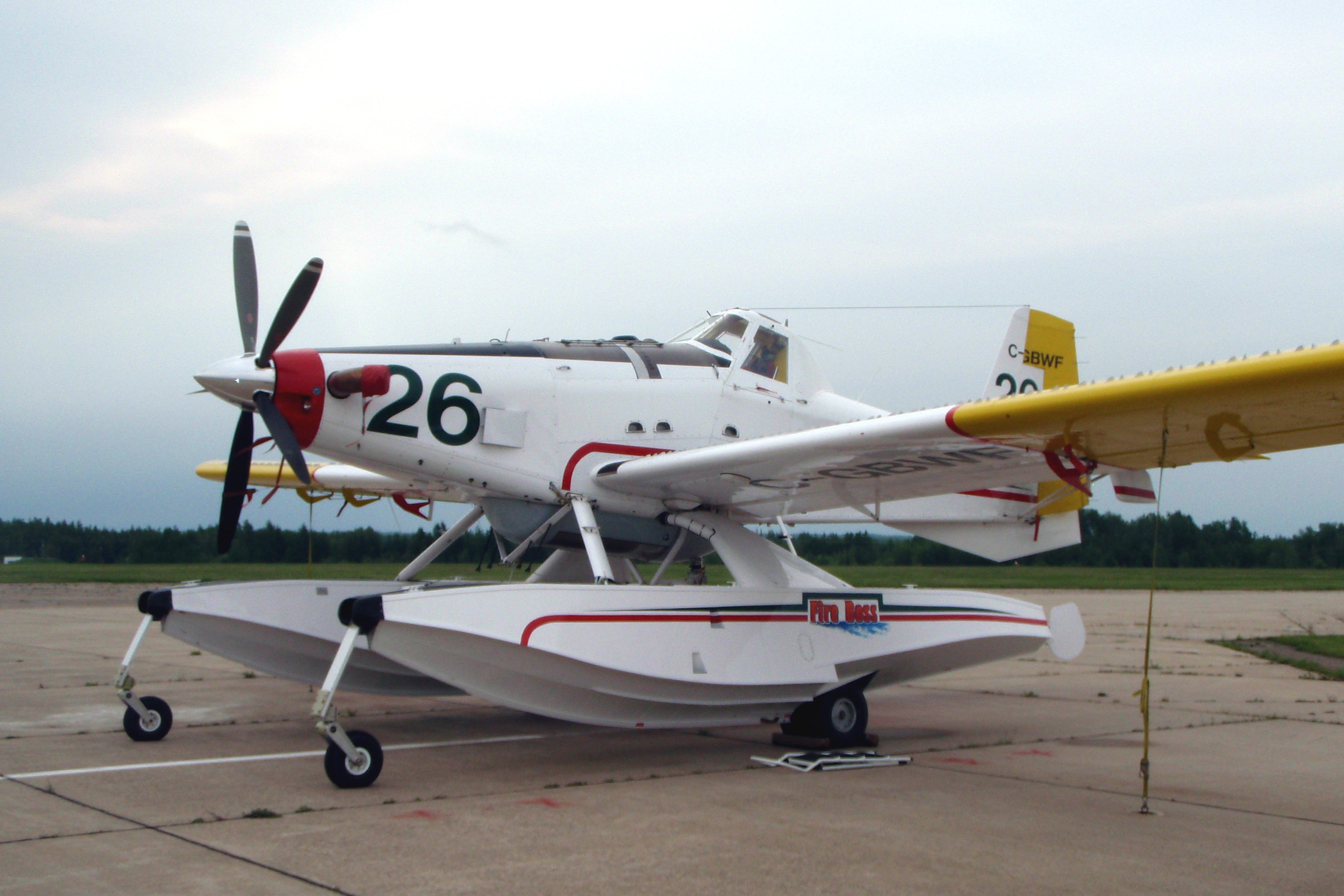
A firefighting AT-802F Air Boss at Miramichi Airport

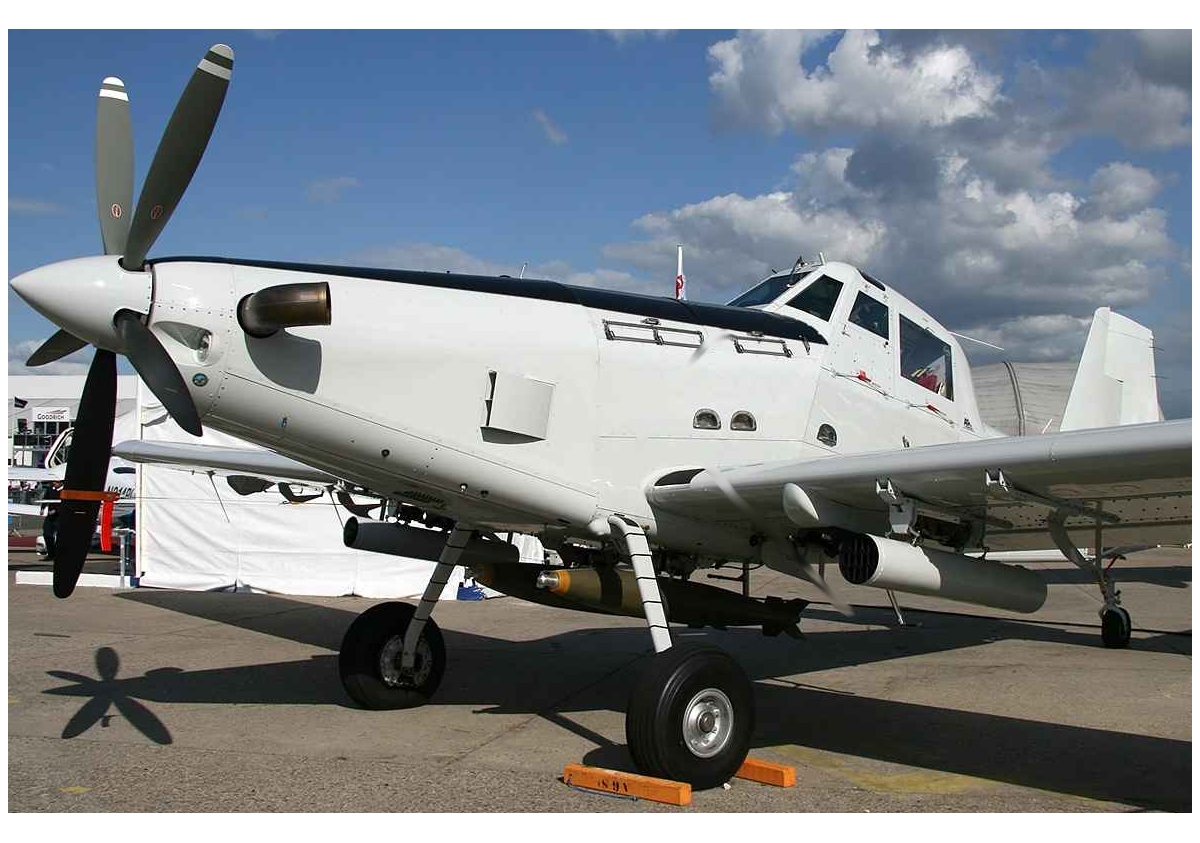
A counter-insurgency AT-802U at the Paris Air Show

Air Tractor Inc. is a United States aircraft manufacturer based in Olney, Texas. Founded in 1974, the company began manufacturing a new agricultural aircraft derived from the S-2B aircraft (designed by founder Leland Snow's previous company, Snow Aeronautical). Designated Model AT-300 Air Tractor, the new aircraft first flew in 1973.

== History ==
Leland Snow began designing his first airplane, the S-1, in 1951. The 23-year-old Snow completed test flights with the S-1 in 1953. Snow's S-1 flew dusting and spraying jobs in the Texas Rio Grande Valley and in Nicaragua until 1957. He followed up the S-1 with the models S-2A, S-2B and S-2C (now the Ayres Thrush), which were produced in Olney, Texas from 1958.

In 1965, Leland Snow sold his company to Rockwell-Standard and was appointed a vice president of the Aero Commander division. During this time, the Model S-2R was developed and named the Thrush. The first 100 Thrush aircraft were built at the Olney Division before the plant was closed and Thrush production moved to Georgia in 1970. More than 500 aircraft were produced under Snow Aeronautical Corporation and Rockwell-Standard in Olney.

Snow resigned from Rockwell and devoted the next two years designing the Air Tractor. Construction on the AT-300, which later became the AT-301, began in 1972. Air Tractor's first turboprop model, the AT-302, was introduced in 1977.

Sixteen years later (1993), Air Tractor delivered its 1,100th airplane and soon began expanding the Olney plant for increased capacity, and less than five years after that (1998), the 2,000th Snow-designed airplane was built there.

Since 1998, Air Tractor has produced a line of aircraft that includes 400, 500, 600, and 800 US gal (330, 420, 500, and 670 imp gal; 1,500, 1,900, 2,300, and 3,000 L) capacity planes powered by Pratt & Whitney turboprop and piston engines.

On July 1, 2008 Air Tractor, Inc. became an employee-owned company with the establishment of an Employee Stock Ownership Plan.

From 2011 through 2018, Air Tractor consistently delivered more turboprop-powered fixed wing aircraft than any other manufacturer; of 601 total worldwide general aviation turboprop deliveries in 2018, 141 (23%) were Air Tractors. In 2024, the company announced that it was discontinuing its piston-engine offerings and would offer only turboprop models.

== Aircraft ==
Model name	First flight	Number built	Type
Air Tractor AT-300	1973		Single engine agricultural monoplane
Air Tractor AT-301			Single engine agricultural monoplane
Air Tractor AT-302			Single engine agricultural monoplane
Air Tractor AT-400	1979		Single engine agricultural monoplane
Air Tractor AT-401			Single engine agricultural monoplane
Air Tractor AT-402			Single engine agricultural monoplane
Air Tractor AT-501	1986		Single engine agricultural monoplane
Air Tractor AT-502			Single engine agricultural monoplane
Air Tractor AT-503			Single engine agricultural monoplane
Air Tractor AT-504			Single engine agricultural monoplane
Air Tractor AT-602	1995		Single engine agricultural monoplane
Air Tractor AT-802	1990		Single engine agricultural monoplane
Air Tractor AT-1002	2009		Single engine agricultural monoplane

== See also ==
- Ayres Corporation
- Thrush Aircraft
- L3Harris OA-1K Sky Warden (Air Tractor-L3Harris AT-802U Sky Warden)

== Bibliography ==
=== Air Tractor AT-300 ===
- Simpson, R. W. (1995). Airlife's General Aviation. Shrewsbury: Airlife Publishing. p. 31.
- Taylor, John W. R., ed. (1988). Jane's All The World's Aircraft 1988–89. Coulsdon, UK: Jane's Defence Data. ISBN 0-7106-0867-5.
- Taylor, Michael J. H. (1989). Jane's Encyclopedia of Aviation. London: Studio Editions. p. 44.

=== Air Tractor AT-400 ===
- Jackson, Paul, ed. (2003). Jane's All The World's Aircraft 2003–2004. Coulsdon, UK: Jane's Information Group. ISBN 0-7106-2537-5.
- Lambert, Mark, ed. (1993). Jane's All The Worlds Aircraft 1993–94. Coudsdon, UK: Janes's Data Division. ISBN 0-7106-1066-1.
- Simpson, R. W. (1995). Airlife's General Aviation. Shrewsbury: Airlife Publishing. pp. 31–32.
- Taylor, John W. R., ed. (1988). Jane's All The World's Aircraft 1988-89. Coulsden, UK: Jane's Defence Data. ISBN 0-7106-0867-5.

=== Air Tractor AT-500 family ===
- Simpson, R. W. (1995). Airlife's General Aviation. Shrewsbury: Airlife Publishing. pp. 31–32.
- Taylor, John W. R., ed. (1988). Jane's All The World's Aircraft 1988-89. Coulsdon, UK: Jane's Defence Data. ISBN 0-7106-0867-5.
- Lambert, John, ed. (1992). Jane's All the World's Aircraft 1992–93. Coulsdon, UK: Jane's Data Division. ISBN 0-7106-0987-6.

=== Air Tractor AT-602 ===
* Jackson, Paul. Jane's All The World's Aircraft 2003–2004. Coulsdon, UK: Jane's Information Group, 2003. ISBN 0-7106-2537-5.
- Taylor, Michael J. H. Brassey's World Aircraft & Systems Directory 1999/2000. London: Brassey's, 1999. ISBN 1-85753-245-7.
- Airliners.net
- Manufacturer's Website

=== Air Tractor AT-802 ===
- Ayton, Mark. "Archangel: Crop Duster to Tank Buster". Air International, Vol. 92, No. 2, February 2017. pp. 24–33. ISSN 0306-5634.
- Hoyle, Craig. "World Air Forces Directory". Flight International, 13–19 December 2011. pp. 26–52.
- Jackson, Paul. Jane's All The World's Aircraft 2003–2004. Coulsdon, UK: Jane's Information Group, 2003. ISBN 0-7106-2537-5.
- Keijsper, Gerard. "Water-Bombers Required!" Air Forces Monthly, London: Key Publishing, July 2008 Issue.
- Simpson, R. W. (1995). Airlife's General Aviation. Shrewsbury: Airlife Publishing. pp. 31–32.
