= Embraer EMB 121 Xingu =

Fixed-wing aircraft in Brazil

EMB 121 Xingu
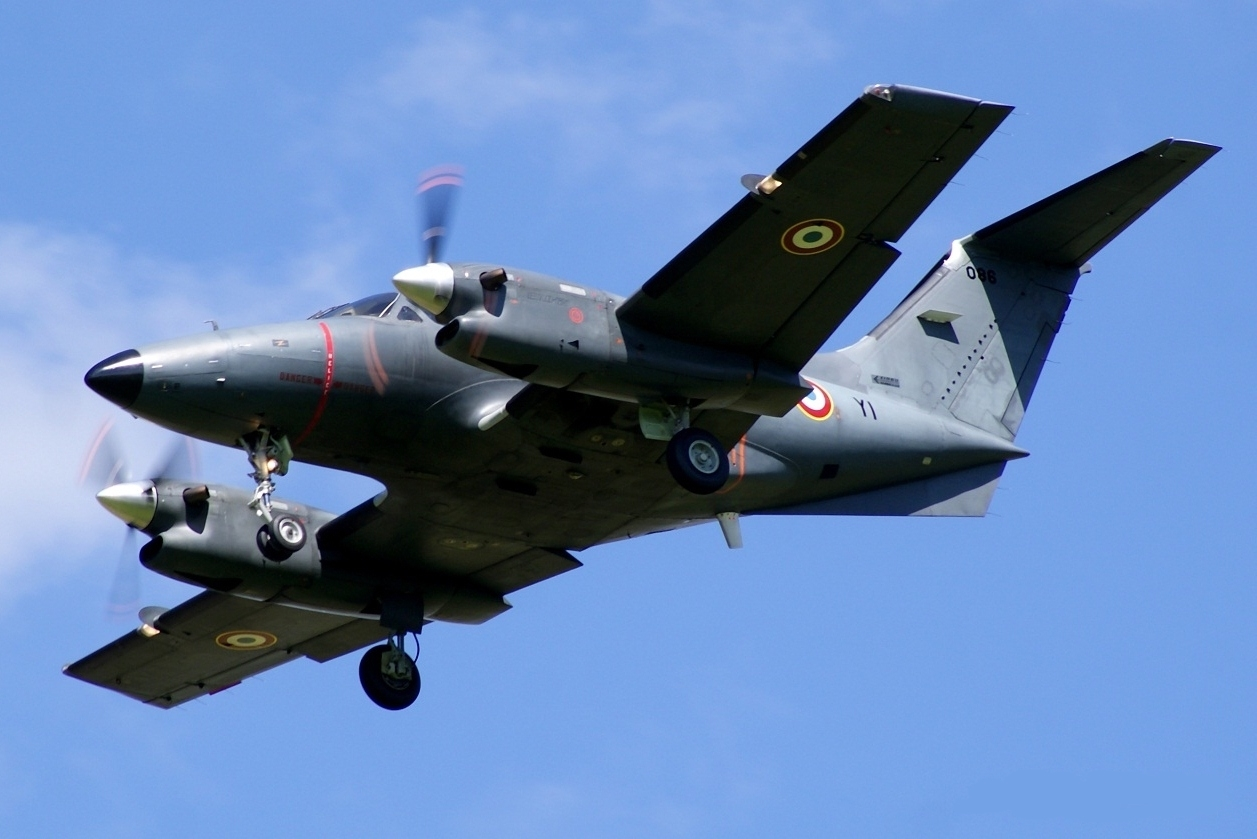
- French Air and Space Force Xingu

General information
- Type: Utility aircraft
- National origin: Brazil
- Manufacturer: Embraer
- Status: Active
- Primary users: French Air and Space Force: Brazilian Air Force; French Navy
- Number built: 106

History
- Manufactured: 1977-1987
- Introduction date: 20 May 1977
- First flight: 10 October 1976
- Developed from: EMB 110 Bandeirante

The Embraer EMB 121 Xingu (Portuguese pronunciation: [ʃĩˈɡu], named after the Xingu River) is a twin-turboprop fixed-wing aircraft built by the Brazilian aircraft manufacturer, Embraer. The design is based on the EMB 110 Bandeirante, using its wing and engine design merged with an all-new fuselage. The EMB 121 first flew on 10 October 1976.

A modified form of the EMB 121, the EMB 121A1 Xingu II, was introduced on 4 September 1981 with a more powerful engine (PT6A-135), increased seating (8 or 9 passengers) and a larger fuel capacity.

Before production ceased in 1987, Embraer had produced 106 EMB 121 aircraft, 51 of which were exported to countries outside Brazil.

== Development and design ==
In 1975, Embraer began development of a family of three derivatives of its Bandeirante airliner, all of which were to feature a pressurised fuselage and T-tail. The smallest of the three, and the first to be launched, was the EMB-121 Xingu, designed to carry six passengers in a typical layout, with a maximum of nine passengers carried. The Xingu is a low-winged cantilever monoplane with a retractable tricycle undercarriage and a circular section fuselage. Its wing is based on that used by the Bandeirante, but with reduced wingspan. Like the Bandeirante, it is powered by two Pratt & Whitney Canada PT6A turboprop engines.

The prototype Xingu, registration PP-ZXI, flew for the first time from Embraer's São Paulo factory on 10 October 1976. Testing resulted in a number of changes to improve performance and handling, including increasing wingspan by 0.4 m (1.3 ft) by adding swept wingtips, fitting a yaw damper and adding a large ventral fin. The first production aircraft made its maiden flight on 20 May 1977, and was exhibited at that year's Paris Air Show. The Xingu received its Brazilian type certificate in May 1977, followed by certification by the British Civil Aviation Authority in July that year.

On 26 July 1980, Embraer flew the prototype Xingu modified to a new version, with its fuselage stretched by the addition of a 25 cm (9.8 in) plug ahead of the wing and a 64 cm (25 in) plug aft of the wing, with the wing span increased by 38 cm (15 in). The new version, which was intended to be better suited to the US market, was powered by two 850 shp (630 kW) PT5A-42 engines, and had more fuel, increasing the aircraft's range. It was initially designated Xingu II, but when development was slowed by Embraer concentrating on other programmes (such as the Tucano, Brasilia and AMX), it was decided to introduce an interim improved version with more power as the EMB-121A1 Xingu II, and the stretched version became the EMB-121B Xingu III. Development of the Xingu III had been abandoned by 1984.

The Xingu II, meanwhile, first flew on 4 September 1981, and was powered by two 750 shp (560 kW) PT6A-135 engines, giving increased performance. It replaced the original version in production after 29 had been built. Xingu Is could be modified to Xingu II standard, and that option was taken by several operators. Production of the Xingu continued to 1987, with a total of 106 Xingus being built. (Note: 111 plus the prototype according to Simpson.)

== Service ==
Initial deliveries of the Xingu were mainly to customers in Brazil, both civil operators and the armed forces, with the Brazilian Air Force receiving six in 1978 for VIP transport. In September 1980, the Xingu was selected by the French Ministry of Defense for a multi-engine training aircraft for the French Air Force (Armée de l'air) and French Naval Aviation (Aéronavale) which would also be suitable for liaison duties for the navy. The Xingu was selected ahead of the American Beechcraft King Air and Cessna 425. A total of 41 aircraft were purchased, 25 for the French Air Force and 16 for the Navy, with deliveries completed by the end of 1983. The Brazilian Air Force's Xingus remained in service until 2010. The Xingu remained in French service in 2022, with 22 in Air Force and 10 in Navy service.

== Variants ==
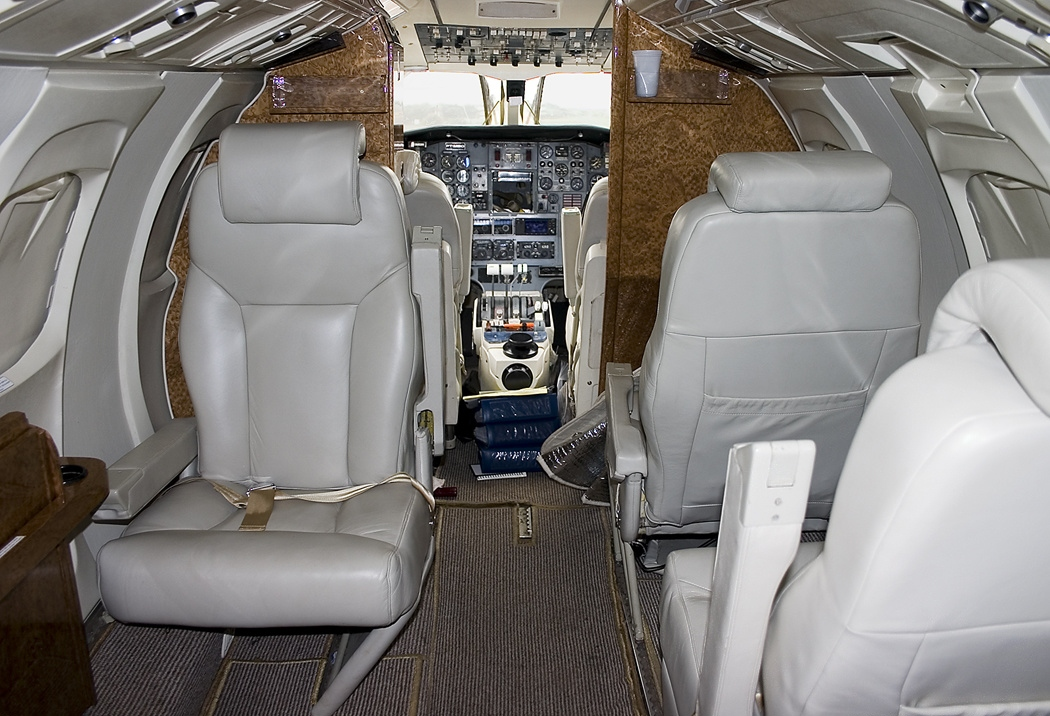
Cabin

EMB 121A Xingu I
Initial production version, powered by two 680 shp (510 kW) Pratt & Whitney Canada PT6A-28 engines.
EMB 121A1 Xingu II
Revised production version, powered by 750 shp (560 kW) Pratt & Whitney Canada PT6A-135 engines.
EMB 121B Xingu III
Projected stretched development, single prototype converted, but no production, powered by 850 shp (630 kW) Pratt & Whitney Canada PT6A-42 engines.
EMB 123 Tapajós
Initially proposed 10-seat derivative with new wings and powered by 1,120 shp (840 kW) Pratt & Whitney Canada PT6A-45 engines. Abandoned in favour of simpler Xingu III.
EMB 120 Araguaia
20–24 seat version, with same wings and engine as EMB 123, but stretched fuselage. Later developed into larger 30-seater Embraer EMB 120 Brasilia, with much less commonality to EMB-121 than originally planned.
VU-9
Brazilian Air Force designation.
EC-9
Brazilian Air Force designation for an electronic warfare variant of the EMB 121.

== Military operators ==
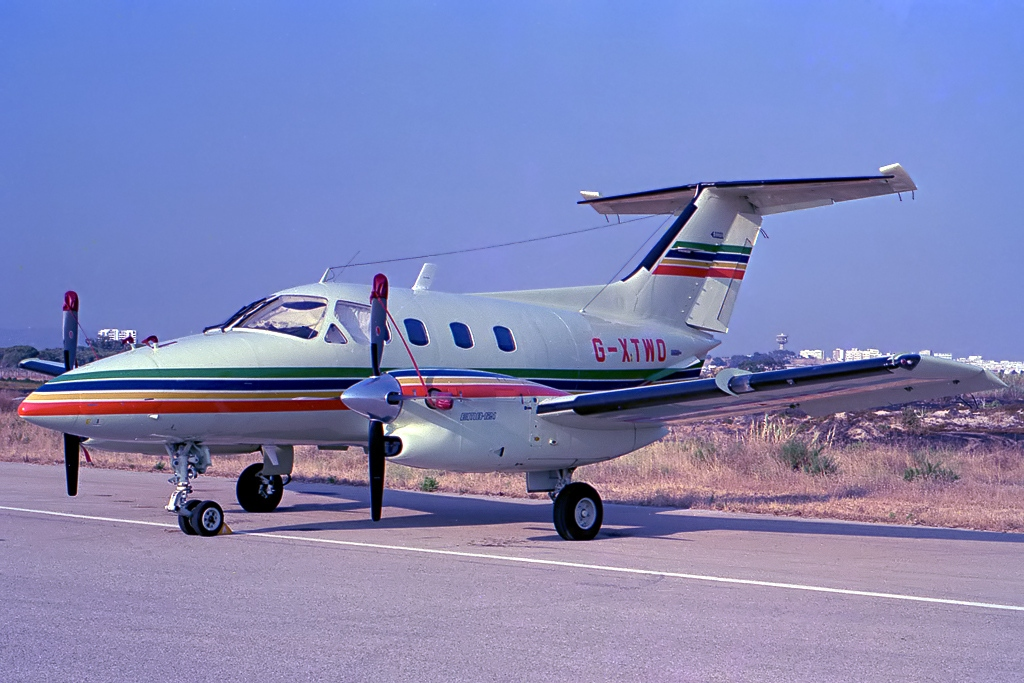
A Private Xingu

Brazil

- Brazilian Air Force

France

- French Air and Space Force
- French Naval Aviation

== Specifications (EMB 121A1 Xingu II) ==
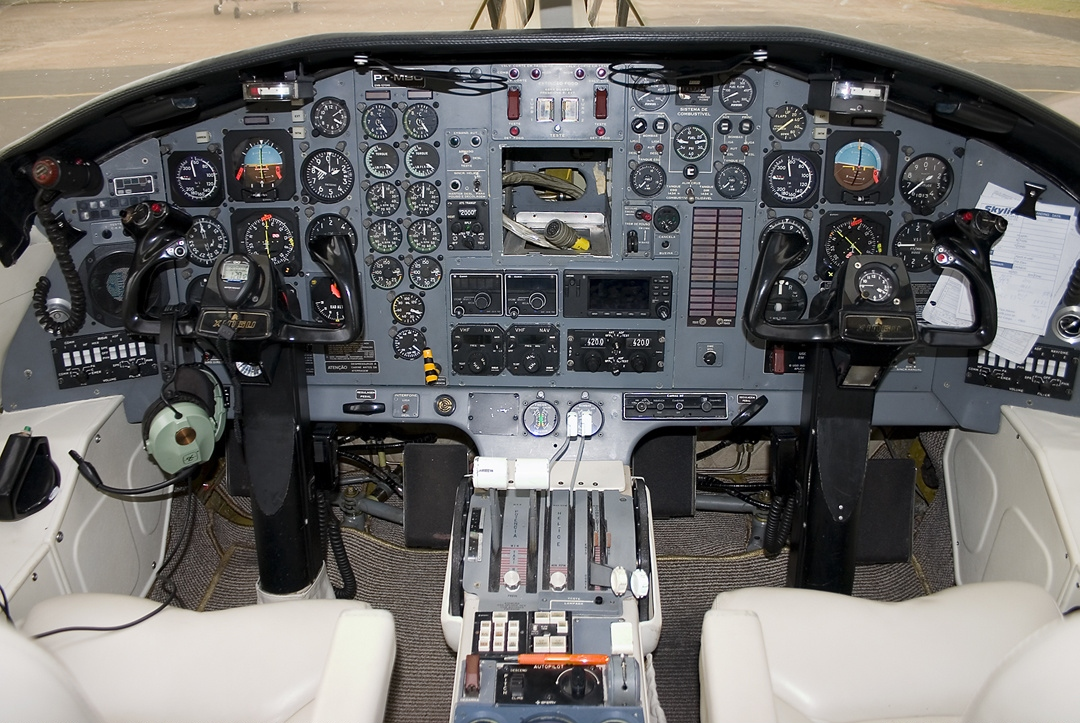
Cockpit

Data from Jane's All the World's Aircraft 1984-85

General characteristics

- Crew: 1/2
- Capacity: 9 passengers or 770 kg (1,700 lb) cargo with 1 pilot
- Length: 12.25 m (40 ft 2 in)
- Wingspan: 14.05 m (46 ft 1 in)
- Height: 4.84 m (15 ft 11 in)
- Wing area: 27.5 m^{2} (296 sq ft)
- Aspect ratio: 7.18
- Empty weight: 3,710 kg (8,179 lb) equipped
- Max takeoff weight: 5,670 kg (12,500 lb)
- Fuel capacity: 1,308 kg (2,884 lb)
- Powerplant: 2 × Pratt & Whitney Canada PT6A-135 turboprop engines, 559 kW (750 hp) each
- Propellers: 4-bladed Hartzell HC-B4TN-3C/T9212B, 2.36 m (7 ft 9 in) diameter constant-speed metal propeller with auto-feathering and full reverse-pitch

Performance

- Maximum speed: 467 km/h (290 mph, 252 kn)
- Cruise speed: 380 km/h (236 mph, 205 kn) at 3,050 m (10,010 ft)
- Stall speed: 141 km/h (87 mph, 76 kn) power off, flaps down
- Range: 1,230 km (760 mi, 660 nmi) at 6,100 m (20,000 ft) maximum fuel with 45 minutes reserve
- Service ceiling: 8,500 m (28,000 ft)
- Rate of climb: 9.1 m/s (1,800 ft/min)
- Wing loading: 206.2 kg/m^{2} (42.2 lb/sq ft)
- Fuel consumption: 0.52 kg/km (1.86 lb/mi) : 250 lb (110 kg)/h per engine at 234 kn (269 mph; 433 km/h) TAS, FL200, -4°C
- Power/mass: 0.197 kW/kg (0.12 shp/lb)

== See also ==
Related development

- Embraer EMB 110
- Embraer EMB 120

Aircraft of comparable role, configuration, and era

- Beechcraft King Air
- Piper PA-31T Cheyenne
- Rockwell Commander 700
- Swearingen Merlin
