= Pratt & Whitney Canada PT6T =

Helicopter turboshaft engine

PT6T Twin-Pac T400
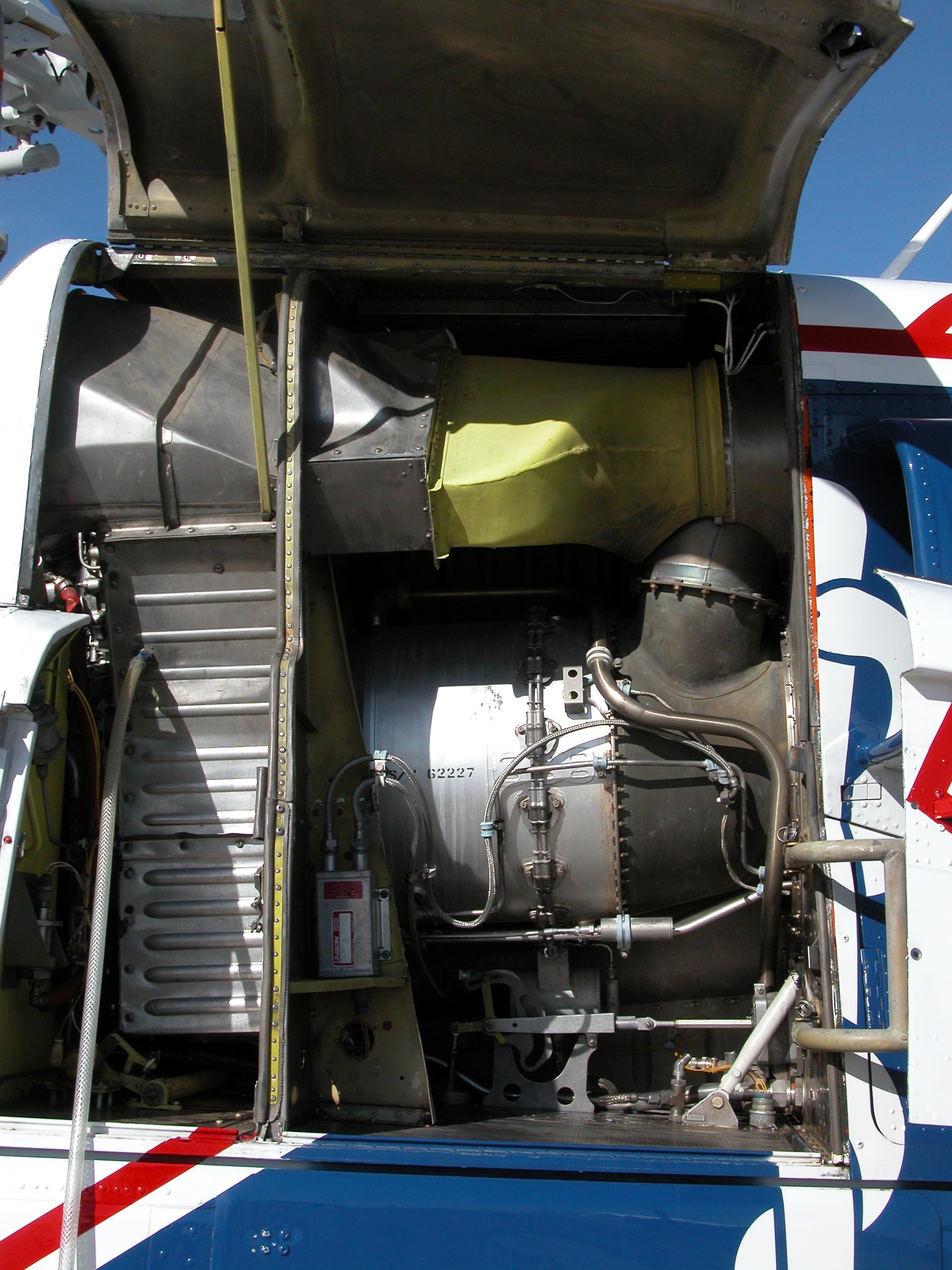
- PT6T-3B as installed in a Bell 412 helicopter
- Type: Turboshaft
- National origin: Canada
- Manufacturer: Pratt & Whitney Canada
- Major applications: Bell AH-1 SeaCobra; Bell 212; Bell 412; Sikorsky S-58T
- Developed from: Pratt & Whitney Canada PT6

The Pratt & Whitney Canada PT6T Twin-Pac is a turboshaft engine designed for helicopters. Manufactured by Pratt & Whitney Canada, its first application was in the Bell 212 and UH-1N Twin Huey helicopter family. The PT6T Twin-Pac consists of two PT6A power turbines driving a common output reduction gearbox, producing up to 2,000 hp at 6,000 rpm. The engine is designated T400 by the U.S. military.

== Development ==
The U.S. military came very close to not procuring the UH-1N Twin Huey because of the PT6T. The purchase of the aircraft for U.S. military use was opposed by the Chairman of the House Armed Services Committee at the time, Mendel Rivers. Rivers took this position because the PT6T was produced in Canada. The Canadian government showed no support for U.S. involvement in Vietnam, and opposed U.S. policies in southeast Asia, as well as accepting U.S. draft dodgers. Rivers was also concerned that procurement of the engines would result in a negative trade deficit situation with Canada. Congress only approved the purchase when it was assured that a U.S. source would be found for the PT6T engines. This source was Pratt & Whitney Engine Services in Bridgeport, West Virginia, which was established in 1971 to assemble and test new T400-WV-402 engines. As a result, the U.S. military ordered 294 Bell 212s under the designation UH-1N, with deliveries commencing in 1970.

== Variants ==
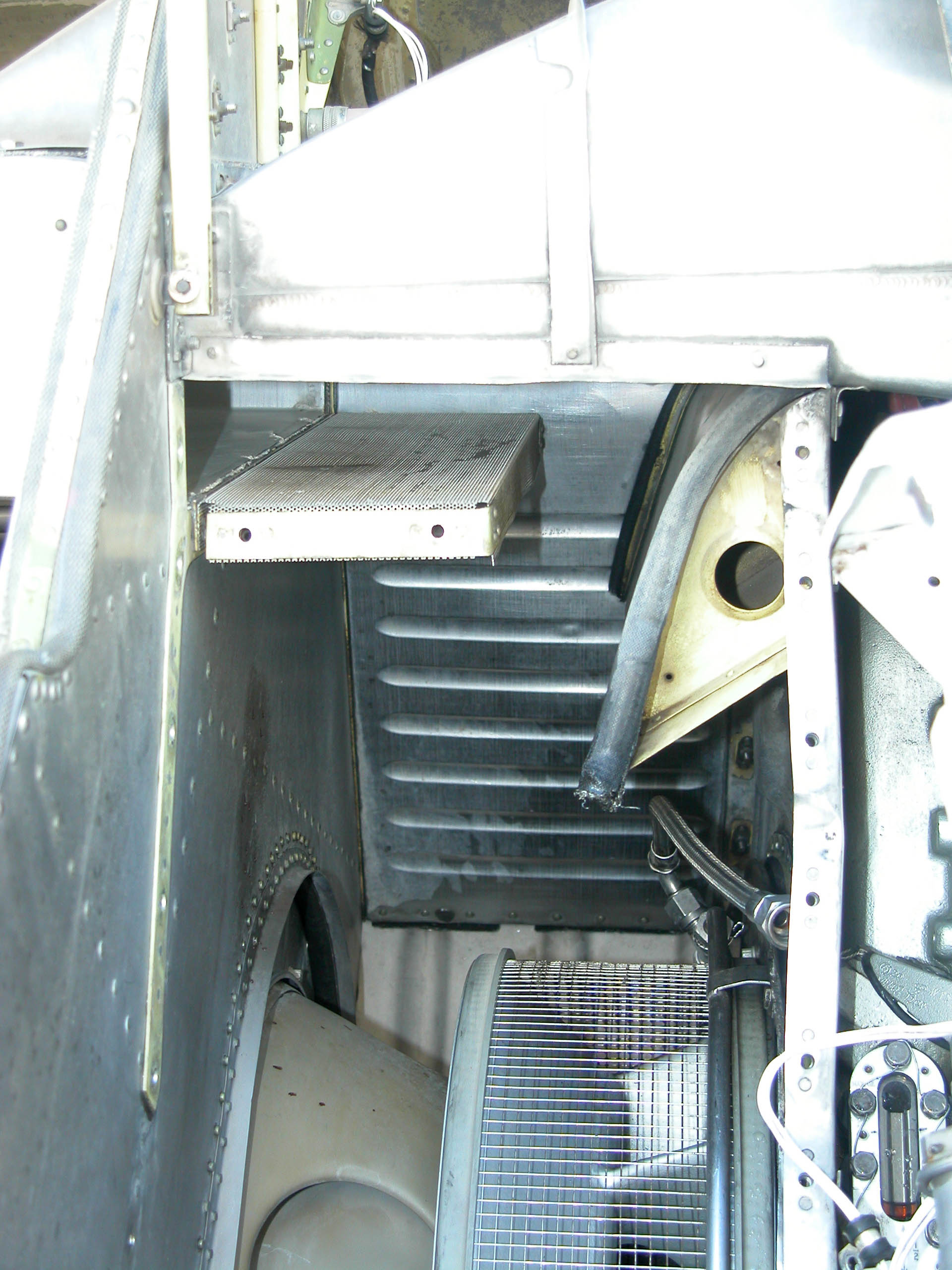
Foreign object damage (FOD) deflection screen on a Bell 412's PT6T

PT6T-3
Basic production model
PT6T-3A
Same as the PT6T-3 but with aluminum (instead of magnesium) gearbox casting, No longer used.
PT6T-3B
Same as the PT6T-3, except for the single power section contingency ratings and has PT6T-6 compressor turbine components.
PT6T-3BE
Same as the PT6T-3B with the removal of the torque sharing function in the torque control and is a PT6T-3BE gearbox fitted with two PT6T-3B power sections.
PT6T-3BF
Similar to the PT6T-3B, except 30-minute one engine inoperative (OEI) rating is equivalent to the 2½ minute OEI rating.
PT6T-3BG
Similar to the PT6T-3BE, except 30 minute OEI rating is equivalent to the 2½ minute OEI rating.
PT6T-3D
Same as the PT6T-3B, except for improved hot section hardware to allow for increased ratings.
PT6T-3DE
Same as the PT6T-3D, except the continuous OEI rating is replaced by a 30 minutes rating.
PT6T-3DF
Same as the PT6T-3DE, except for improved hot section hardware to allow for increased ratings.
PT6T-6
Same as the PT6T-3, except for the 2½ min rating and higher ratings and improved engine parts.
PT6T-6B
Same as the PT6T-6 with the removal of the torque sharing function in the torque control and is a PT6T-6B gearbox with two PT6T-6 power sections.
PT6T-9
Similar to the PT6T-3DF, except for an improved hot section and it is equipped with an engine electronic control system.
T400-C-400
Military PT6T-3
T400-CP-401
Military variant used on the VH-1N variant of the UH-1N.
T400-WV-402
Military PT6T-6, assembled by Pratt & Whitney Engine Services, Inc. in West Virginia

== Applications ==
- Bell 212
- Bell 309
- Bell 412
- Bell AH-1J and AH-1T SeaCobra
- Bell CH-146 Griffon
- Bell UH-1N Twin Huey
- Sikorsky S-58T
- Sikorsky S-69

== Specifications ==
Data from Aircraft engines of the World 1970

==== General characteristics ====
- Type: Coupled Turboshaft engine
- Length: 65.3 in (1,660 mm)
- Width: 44.4 in (1,130 mm)
- Height: 31.6 in (800 mm)
- Frontal area: 2.3 sq ft (0.21 m^{2})
- Diameter: 19 in (480 mm) (each gas generator)
- Dry weight: 617 lb (280 kg)

==== Components ====
- Compressor: 3-stage axial and 1-stage centrifugal (each gas generator)
- Combustors: Reverse flow annular combustor
- Turbine: 1-stage gas generator turbine + 1-stage free-power turbine (each gas generator)
- Fuel type: Aviation Kerosene, such as Jet A-1, JP-4 or JP-5
- Oil system: Pressure spray at 80 psi (5.5 bar) with return

==== Performance ====
- Maximum power output:

- Take-off power: 1,800 shp (1,300 kW) at 33,000 free-power turbine rpm: flat-rated to 1,290 shp (960 kW)
- Maximum continuous power: 1,600 shp (1,200 kW) at 33,000 free-power turbine rpm: flat-rated to 1,135 shp (846 kW)

- Overall pressure ratio: 7.2:1
- Air mass flow: 6.5 lb/s (180 kg/min) at 37,500 gas generator rpm (each gas generator)
- Specific fuel consumption: 0.6 lb/(hp⋅h) (0.36 kg/kWh)
- Power-to-weight ratio: 2.92 hp/lb (4.80 kW/kg)

== See also ==
Related development

- Pratt & Whitney Canada PT6

Comparable engines

- Armstrong Siddeley Double Mamba
- Continental XT67

Related lists

- List of aircraft engines
