= Aero Ae 270 Spirit =

Czech general utility aircraft

Ae 270 Spirit
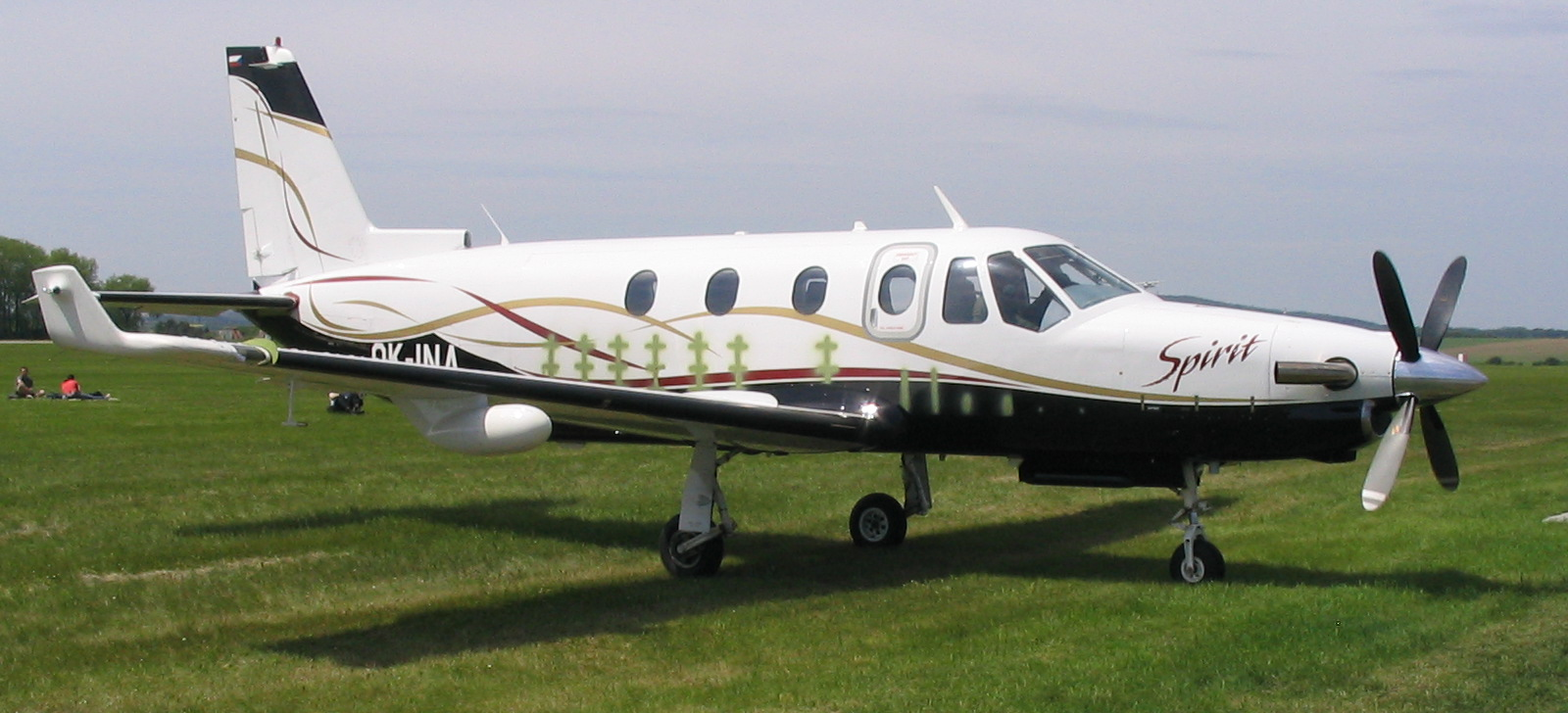

General information
- Type: Civil utility aircraft
- National origin: Czech Republic
- Manufacturer: Aero Vodochody

History
- First flight: 25 July 2000

The Aero Ae270 Spirit was a single-engine turboprop general utility aircraft that was developed by the Czech aircraft company Aero Vodochody. A prototype made its maiden flight in 2000, with European Aviation Safety Agency (EASA) Type Certification in 2005 and Federal Aviation Administration (FAA) type certification in 2006. No production followed.

== History ==
=== Prototype ===
Design began in the early 1990s. The aircraft's configuration was finalized by 1993. In 1997, Aero signed an agreement with AIDC of Taiwan to jointly manufacture and market the aircraft through Ibis Aerospace. The first prototype (0001, OK-EMA) was completed in 2000, and it first flew on July 25, 2000.

The initial design of the aircraft was projected to have an empty weight of 1,790 kilograms (3,950 lb), a maximum take-off weight of 3,000 kilograms (6,600 lb), and a ceiling of 7,620 metres (25,000 ft). Five prototypes were planned, two for static and dynamic tests and three for flight tests. The requirements changed and the aircraft was redesigned for greater performance and capabilities, new equipment added, a new engine variant chosen. The second (partial) prototype was used for static tests and the fourth, for fatigue tests. The third prototype (OK-SAR) first flew in 2002. The fifth prototype (OK-LIB) was finished in 2003, with its first flight in February. The sixth prototype (OK-INA) was also finished in 2003. UCL (Czech Civil Aeronautical Institute) added more requirements, which delayed further tests. The first prototype was no longer usable for EASA test flights as changes were significant. A seventh prototype (OK-EVA) was built in 2004.

In 2004, AIDC announced that it would not deliver wings for additional airplanes. Aero Vodochody also had issues with money for certification and some members of upper management at Aero were against the program. Deteriorating flight parameters and Aero management interest led to cancellation of preliminary orders. Aero Vodochody was never able to calculate a production price, mostly because the wing was produced in Taiwan and alternate production in Czech Republic was never envisioned.

In 2004, AIDC announced that its business priorities had shifted from the civil to military aviation. At the same time, Aero Vodochody's upper management experienced a similar shift in their business priorities. Aero management's declining interest led to the cancellation of eighty advance orders for the Ae270 aircraft.

=== Certification ===
Airworthiness was certified by the Czech Civil Aviation Authority permitting training and aerial work, including commencement of commercial use. EASA certification completed on December the 12th 2005. The FAA certificate was received on 24 February 2006.

=== Programme suspension ===
During 2008 the project was suspended, jigs and tools removed and 3 unfinished fuselages (including fatigue test prototype 0004) were moved to the Air Park Zruč u Plzně museum. In July 2011, Aero Vodochody stated that the Ae-270 Ibis/Spirit program (including know-how, jigs and tools) would be sold to Belarus, where serial production was planned to start in 2015.

Aircraft Integrated Solutions, a British aviation engineering company based in Manchester, announced in August 2016 that it would restart the programme after its intellectual property and rights as well as European and US type certificates were acquired by its parent, Lebanese investment house COPS.

== Specifications (Ae 270HP) ==
Data from Jane's All The World's Aircraft 2003–2004

General characteristics

- Crew: 1 or 2
- Capacity:
  - 8 passengers or
  - 1,200 kg (2,600 lb) cargo
- Length: 12.23 m (40 ft 1 in)
- Wingspan: 13.82 m (45 ft 4 in)
- Height: 4.78 m (15 ft 8 in)
- Wing area: 21.00 m^{2} (226.0 sq ft)
- Aspect ratio: 9.1:1
- Empty weight: 2,300 kg (5,071 lb)
- Gross weight: 3,700 kg (8,157 lb)
- Fuel capacity: 1,170 L (310 US gal; 260 imp gal)
- Powerplant: 1 × Pratt & Whitney Canada PT6A-66A turboprop, 630 kW (850 shp)
- Propellers: 4-bladed Hartzell HC-D4N-3/D9511FK, 2.41 m (7 ft 11 in) diameter

Performance

- Cruise speed: 500 km/h (310 mph, 270 kn) at FL 200 (max. cruise)
- Stall speed: 76 km/h (47 mph, 41 kn) (flaps down)
- Range: 2,980 km (1,850 mi, 1,610 nmi) (30 minutes reserves); 2,630 km (1,630 mi; 1,420 nmi)
- Service ceiling: 9,140 m (29,990 ft)
- Rate of climb: 8.7 m/s (1,710 ft/min)

== See also ==
Aircraft of comparable role, configuration, and era

- Myasishchev M-101T
- PAC P-750 XSTOL
- Pilatus PC-12
- Piper Meridian
- SOCATA TBM

Related lists

- List of civil aircraft
