= Pratt & Whitney Canada PT6 =

Turboprop aircraft engine family by Pratt & Whitney Canada

PT6
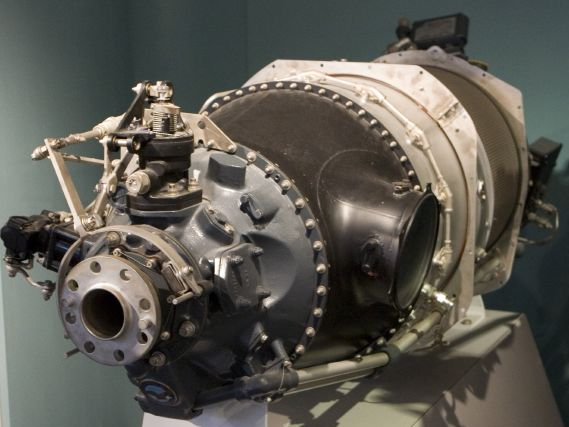
- A PT6A-20 on display at the Canada Aviation and Space Museum
- Type: Turboprop / turboshaft
- National origin: Canada
- Manufacturer: Pratt & Whitney Canada
- First run: 1960
- Major applications: AgustaWestland AW139; Beech King Air and Super King Air; Beech Starship; Baykar Bayraktar Akıncı; Cessna 208 Caravan de Havilland Canada DHC-6 Twin Otter; Pilatus PC-12; Piper M700 Fury
- Number built: 64,000 (as of February 2023)
- Variants: Pratt & Whitney Canada PT6T

The Pratt & Whitney Canada PT6 is a family of turboprop aircraft engines produced by Pratt & Whitney Canada. It was designed in 1958, first flew on 30 May 1961, entered service in 1964, and has been continually updated since. The PT6 consists of two basic sections: a gas generator with accessory gearbox, and a free-power turbine with reduction gearbox. In aircraft, the engine is often mounted "backwards," with the intake at the rear and the exhaust at the front, so that the turbine is directly connected to the propeller. Many variants of the PT6 have been produced, not only as turboprops but also as turboshaft engines for helicopters, land vehicles, hovercraft, and boats; as auxiliary power units; and for industrial uses. By November 2015, 51,000 had been produced, which had logged 400 million flight hours from 1963 to 2016. It is known for its reliability, with an in-flight shutdown rate of 1 per 651,126 hours in 2016. The PT6A turboprop engine covers the power range between 580 and 1,940 shp (430 and 1,450 kW), while the PT6B/C are turboshaft variants for helicopters.

== Development ==
In 1956, Pratt & Whitney Canada's (PWC) president, Ronald Riley, ordered engineering manager Dick Guthrie to hire a team of gas turbine specialists to design a small gas turbine engine. Demand for the Wasp radial engine was still strong and its production was profitable but the aim was to become Canada's prime engine company by focusing on a small gas turbine engine. Riley gave Guthrie a modest budget of C$100,000. Guthrie recruited twelve engineers with experience gained at various places including the National Research Council in Ottawa, Orenda Engines in Ontario, Bristol Aero Engines and Blackburn Aircraft. They completed the detailed design of an engine for Canadair's small jet trainer, the CL-41. It was a 3,000-pound-force (13 kN) thrust turbojet but the design was taken over by the US headquarters, who developed it into the Pratt & Whitney JT12. The team had to wait for market assessments to define their next engine, a 450 shaft horsepower (340 kW) turboprop for twin-engined aircraft, the PT6. The early development of the PT6, which first flew in May-June 1961, was beset with engineering problems, cost overruns and lack of sales. It was almost cancelled. The team lacked the ability to deal with the technical difficulties, i.e. how to develop the engine, because, as one of the team Elvie Smith recalled, they came from research and design backgrounds. They learned how to run a development program, such as testing around the clock rather than on one shift, from a PWA team which directed the development for several months.

The PT6 first flew on 30 May 1961, mounted as a third engine in the nose of a Beech 18 aircraft which had been converted by de Havilland at its Downsview facility in North York, Ontario. Full-scale production started in 1963, with service entry the following year. The Beech 18 continued as a PT6 and propeller flying test-bed until it was replaced with a Beech King Air in 1980. The King Air test-engine or propeller replaced one of the standard ones. In 1974 the Beech 18 had been unable to fly fast enough and high enough to test the PT6A-50 for the de Havilland Canada Dash 7 so a Vickers Viscount was modified as a PT6 test-bed with a Dash-7 installation in the nose.

The first production PT6 model, the PT6A-6, was certificated in December 1963. The first application was the Beech Queen Air, enticing the U.S. Army to buy a fleet of the U-21 Ute variant. This helped launch the King Air with Beechcraft selling about 7,000 by 2012. From 1963 to 2016 power-to-weight ratio was improved by 50%, brake specific fuel consumption by 20% and overall pressure ratio reached 14:1. Its development continues and while today its basic configuration is the same as in 1964, updates have included a cooled first-stage turbine vane, additional compressor and turbine stages and single-crystal turbine blades in the early 1990s. Its pressure ratio is 13:1 in the AgustaWestland AW609 tiltrotor, the highest that can be used without cooled turbine blades.

In response to the General Electric GE93, in 2017 Pratt & Whitney Canada started testing core technology and systems for a proposed 2,000 shp (1,500 kW) engine to replace the most powerful versions of the PT6. It was considered likely to be a development of the PT6C core, and would fit between the 1,750 shp (1,300 kW) PT6C-67C/E and the 2,300 shp (1,700 kW) PW100 family. It was expected to be ready to launch by the end of 2017 for an initial helicopter platform with a 10-15% reduction in brake specific fuel consumption. This 2,000 hp engine would target a possible new market such as a Super PC-12, a more powerful TBM, or a bigger King Air.

=== PW100 ===
When de Havilland Canada asked for a much larger engine for the DHC-8, roughly twice the power of the Large PT6, Pratt & Whitney Canada responded with a new design initially known as the PT7, later renamed Pratt & Whitney Canada PW100.

== Design ==
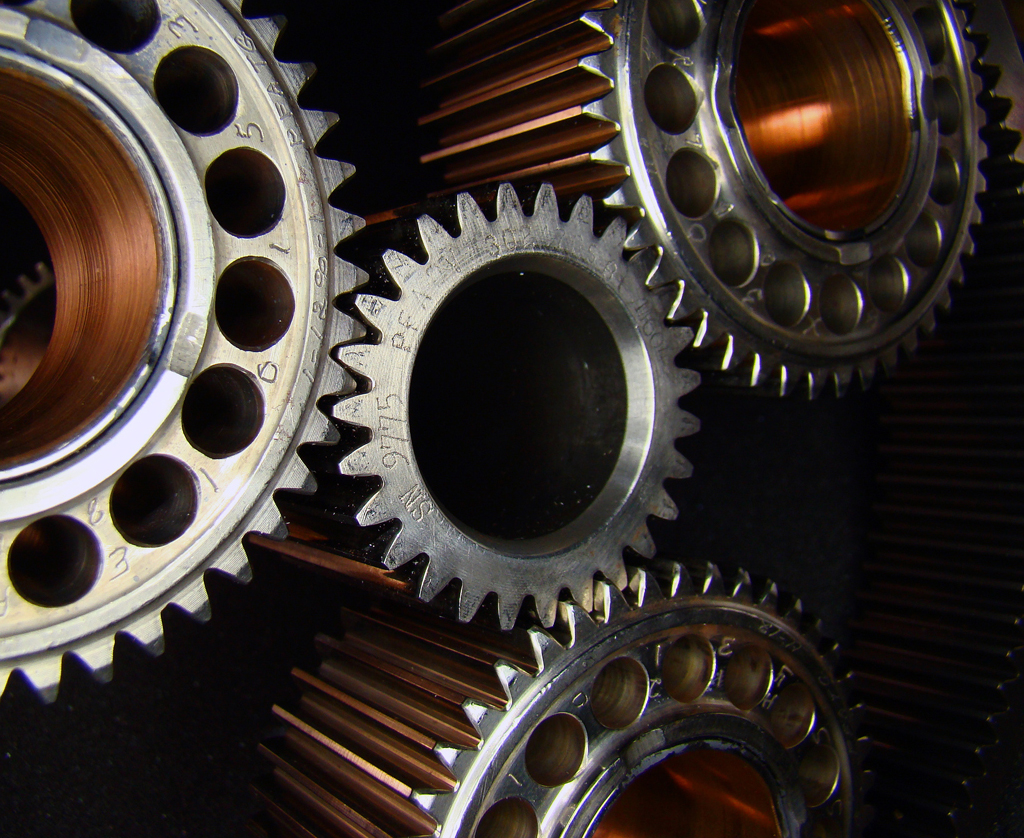
Epicyclic reduction gears on Pratt & Whitney Canada PT6 gas turbine engine

The rate at which parts deteriorate in a gas turbine is unbalanced insofar as the hottest parts need replacing or repairing more often than the cooler-running parts. If the hotter parts can be removed without disturbing the rest of the engine, for example without removing the complete engine from the aircraft, maintenance costs are reduced. It was achieved with the PT6 by having the hottest parts, the gas generator turbine and combustor, at the propeller end. They are removed without disturbing the rest of the engine with its connections to the aircraft. This arrangement was patented by designer Newland, one of the original PT6 team. A similar general arrangement with a free-turbine power take-off at the exhaust end (the 1,000 shp (750 kW) P.181 engine) had been shown by Armstrong Siddeley Motors at the Farnborough Airshow in 1957.

An early design improvement, incorporated in the PT6A-20, was the pipe diffuser patented by Vrana, another of the original PT6 team. It replaced the vaned type diffuser used in centrifugal compressors. The pipe diffuser became standard design practice for P&WC. Another design change improved the part-speed functioning of the compressor. It is common to bleed air from a compressor to make it work properly at low engine speeds. The PT6 has a bleed arrangement which reuses the bleed air by returning it in a tangential direction at the entry to the compressor, an idea patented by Schaum et al. and titled "Turbine Engine With Induced Pre-Swirl at Compressor Inlet". It acts like a variable vane and is known as a "Jet-Flap".

All versions of the engine consist of two sections that can be easily separated for maintenance: a gas generator supplies hot pressurized gas to a free power turbine. The starter has to accelerate only the gas generator, making the engine easy to start, particularly in cold weather. Air enters the gas-generator through an inlet screen into the low-pressure axial compressor. This has three stages on small and medium versions of the engine and four stages on large versions. The air then flows into a single-stage centrifugal compressor, through a folded annular combustion chamber, and finally through a single-stage turbine that powers the compressors at about 45,000 rpm. Hot gas from the gas generator flows into the power turbine, which turns at about 30,000 rpm. It has one stage on the small engines and two stages on the medium and large ones. For turboprop use, this powers a two-stage planetary output reduction gearbox, which turns the propeller at a speed of 1,900 to 2,200 rpm. The exhaust gas then escapes through two side-mounted ducts in the power turbine housing. The turbines are concentric with the combustion chamber, reducing overall length.

In most aircraft installations the PT6 is mounted so that the intake end of the engine is towards the rear of the aircraft, leading to it being known by many as the "back-to-front" engine. This places the power section at the front of the nacelle, where it can drive the propeller directly without the need for a long shaft. Intake air is usually fed to the engine via an underside mounted duct, and the two exhaust outlets are directed rearward. This arrangement aids maintenance by allowing the entire power section to be removed along with the propeller, exposing the gas-generator section. To facilitate rough-field operations, foreign objects are diverted from the compressor intake by inertial separators in the inlet. In some installation such as the PT6A-66B version in the Piaggio P.180 Avanti, the engine is reversed, with the propeller acting as a "pusher", the accessory gearbox facing the front of the aircraft.

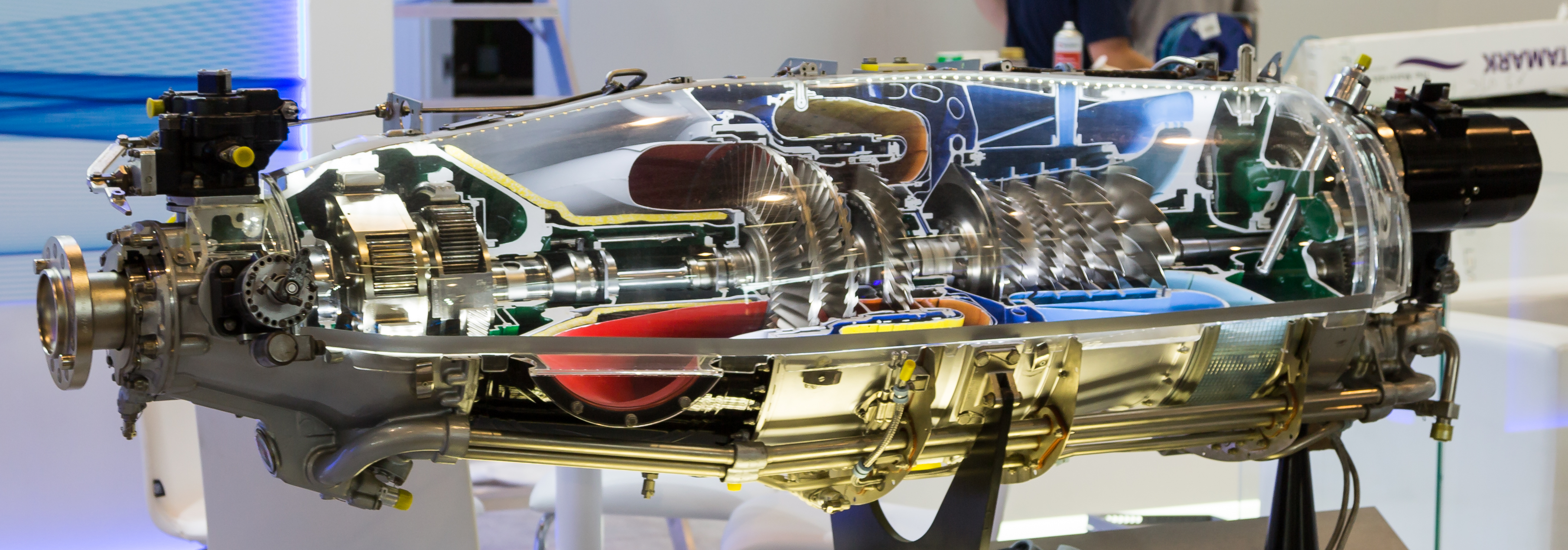
From left to right: propeller mount, reduction gear, exhaust, 2-stage free power turbine, 1-stage gas generator turbine surrounded by the combustor, 1 centrifugal then 4 axial compressor stages, intake, and accessories

== Operational history ==
By the 40th anniversary of its maiden flight in 2001, over 36,000 PT6As had been delivered, not including the other versions. Up to October 2003, 31,606 delivered engines have flown more than 252 million hours. Till November 2015, 51,000 have been produced. The family logged 400 million flight hours from 1963 to 2016.

The PT6 family is known for its reliability with an in-flight shutdown rate of 1 per 333,333 hours up to October 2003, 1 per 127,560 hours in 2005 in Canada, 1 per 333,000 hours from 1963 to 2016, 1 per 651,126 hours over 12 months in 2016. Time between overhauls is between 3,600 and 9,000 hours and hot-section inspections between 1,800 and 2,000 hours.

Early PT6 versions lacked a FADEC, autothrottle could be installed as an aftermarket upgrade with an actuator, initially for single-engine aircraft like the PC-12 and potentially in twin-turboprop aircraft. In October 2019 the PT6 E-Series was launched on the PC-12 NGX, the first general aviation turboprop with an electronic propeller and engine control system with a single lever and better monitoring for longer maintenance intervals, increased from 300 to 600 hours, and a TBO increased by 43% to 5,000 hours, reducing engine operating costs by at least 15%. In April 2022, Daher announced that the updated SOCATA TBM-960 would be powered by the PT6E-66XT.

== Variants ==
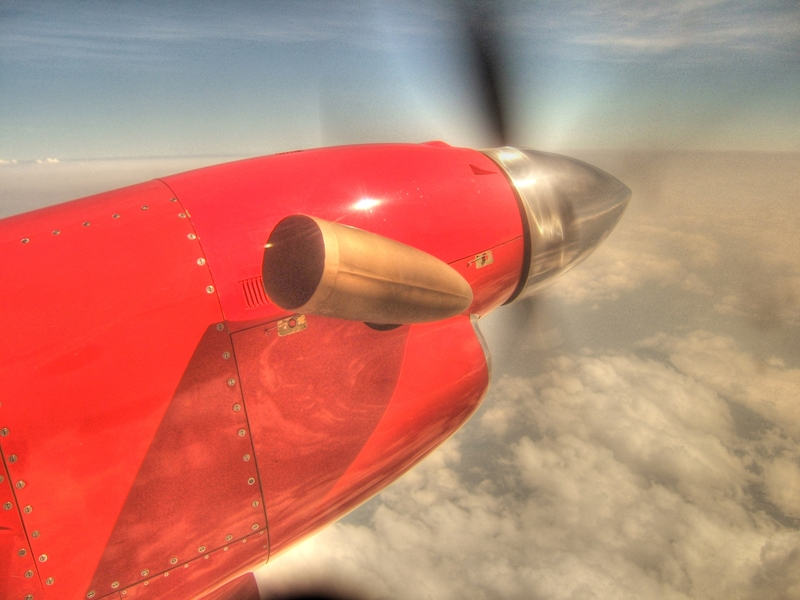
A PT6A-67D engine on a Beechcraft 1900D. The turbine exhaust (copper-colored pipe) is prominent.

The main variant, the PT6A, is available in a wide variety of models, covering the power range between 580 and 920 shaft horsepower (430 and 690 kilowatts) in the original series, and up to 1,940 shaft horsepower (1,450 kilowatts) in the 'large' lines. The PT6B and PT6C are turboshaft variants for helicopters. In US military use, they are designated as T74 or T101.

Several other versions of the PT6 have appeared over time:

- the Large PT6 added an extra axial compressor stage(4), and another power turbine stage(2) and a deeper output reduction, producing almost twice the power output, between 1,090 and 1,920 shaft horsepower (810 and 1,430 kilowatts).
- the Medium PT6 added another power turbine stage(2) -41 thru the -60 engines
- the PT6B is a helicopter turboshaft model, featuring an offset reduction gearbox with a freewheeling clutch and power turbine governor, producing 1,000 horsepower (750 kilowatts) at 4,500 rpm.
- the PT6C is a helicopter model, with a single side-mounted exhaust, producing 2,000 horsepower (1,500 kilowatts) at 30,000 rpm, which is stepped down in a user-supplied gearbox.
- the PT6E is a large PT6A derivative equipped with digital engine control.
- the PT6T Twin-Pac consists of two PT6 engines driving a common-output reduction gearbox, producing almost 2,000 horsepower (1,500 kilowatts) at 6,000 rpm.
- the ST6 is a version intended for stationary applications, originally developed for the UAC TurboTrain, and now widely used as auxiliary power units on large aircraft, as well as many other roles.

The PT6A family is a series of free-turbine turboprop engines providing 500 to 1,940 shaft horsepower (370 to 1,450 kilowatts)

=== Small ===
Small
| variant | equivalent shaft horsepower (eshp) | shaft horsepower (shp) | applications |
|---|---|---|---|
| PT6A-6, 6A, 6B | 525 | 500 | Heron-TP-XP UAV from Israel |
| PT6A-11 | 528 | 500 | |
| PT6A-11AG | 580 | 550 | Air Tractor AT-400 (402A / 402B); Schweizer Ag-Cat G-164B Turbine |
| PT6A-15AG | 715 | 680 | Air Tractor AT-400 (402A/402B); Air Tractor AT-502, -502A and -502B; Frakes Turbocat Model A / B / C Schweizer Ag-Cat G-164B Turbine |
| PT6A-20 | 579 | 550 | De Havilland Canada DHC-6 Twin Otter Srs. 100–200 |
| PT6A-20A, -20B, -6/C20 | 579 | 550 | |
| PT6A-21 | 580 | 550 | Beechcraft King Air C90A / B / SE; Beechcraft Bonanza (turbine conversion); Royal Turbine Duke; Evektor EV-55 Outback; JetPROP DL |
| PT6A-25, -25A | 580 | 550 | Beechcraft T-34C Turbo Mentor; Pilatus PC-7 Turbo Trainer |
| PT6A-25C | 783 | 750 | Embraer EMB 312 Tucano; Pilatus PC-7 Mk.II M PZL-130 Orlik / TC-II Turbo-Orlik |
| PT6A-27 | 715 | 680 | Beechcraft Model 99A, B99; De Havilland Canada DHC-6 Twin Otter 300; Harbin Y-12 (CATIC / HAIG); Embraer EMB 110 Bandeirante; Let L-410 Turbolet; Pilatus PC-6/B Turbo-Porter |
| PT6A-28 | 715 | 680 | Embraer EMB 121 Xingu; Beechcraft King Air 100 Series |
| PT6A-29 | 778 | 750 | |
| PT6A-34 | 783 | 750 | Embraer EMB 110 Bandeirante/111; Embraer EMB 821 Carajá; Grumman Mallard (Frakes turbine conversion); JetPROP DLX; PAC P-750 XSTOL (750XL); Quest Kodiak (Daher); Vazar Dash 3 Turbine Otter; De Havilland Canada DHC-6 Twin Otter 400; Thrush S2R-T34; Pilatus PC-6/B Turbo-Porter (STC) BX Turbo de Havilland Canada Beaver DHC-2 (STC); ARON M80 |
| PT6A-34B | 783 | 750 | |
| PT6A-34AG | 783 | 750 | Air Tractor AT-502B; Frakes/Grumman Turbo-Cat Model A / B / C Pacific Aerospace 750; PZL-Okecie PZL-106 Turbo Kruk; Schweizer Ag-Cat G-164B/D Turbine; Thrush Model 510P; Thrush S2R-T34 |
| PT6A-35 | 787 | 750 | Blue 35; JetPROP DLX |
| PT6A-36 | 783 | 750 | Thrush S2R-T34 (dry configuration only) |
| PT6A-38 | 801 | 750 | |
| PT6A-110 | 502 | 475 | Schweizer AG-Cat Turbine; Royal Turbine Duke |
| PT6A-112 | 528 | 500 | Cessna Conquest I |
| PT6A-114 | 632 | 600 | Cessna 208 Caravan |
| PT6A-114A | 725 | 675 | Cessna 208 Caravan 675, 208B |
| PT6A-116 | 736 | 700 | |
| PT6A-121 | 647 | 615 | |
| PT6A-135 | 787 | 750 | EMB 121A1 Xingu II |
| PT6A-135A | 787 | 750 | Beechcraft King Air F90-1 / C90GT / C90GTi / C90GTx; Blackhawk XP135A Cheyenne Series; Blackhawk XP135A Conquest I Blackhawk XP135A King Air 90 Series; Cessna Conquest I JMB Evolution (formerly Lancair Evolution); Silverhawk 135 / StandardAero C90 / E90; StandardAero Cheyenne Series; StandardAero King Air F90; T-G Aviation Super Cheyenne; Vazar Dash 3 Turbine Otter |
| PT6A-140 | 912 | 867 | Cessna Grand Caravan EX |
| PT6A-140A | 945 | 900 | ASIC ULtimate Grand Caravan (upgrade); Blackhawk Aerospace XP140 (Caravan upgrade); Evolution Aircraft EVOT-850 (formerly Lancair); SuperPac 750XL-II (upgrade to the PAC P-750 XSTOL ) |
| PT6A-140AG | 911 | 867 | Air Tractor 502XP; Thrush Model 510P2+ |

=== Medium ===
Medium
| variant | equivalent shaft horsepower (eshp) | shaft horsepower (shp) | applications |
|---|---|---|---|
| PT6A-40 | 749 | 700 | |
| PT6A-41, -41AG | 903 | 850 | Beechcraft King Air 200 / B200; Piper Cheyenne III / IIIA; Beechcraft C-12 Huron; Thrush S2R-T34 (-41 and -41AG) |
| PT6A-42, -42A | 903 | 850 | Beechcraft C-12 Huron E and F Beechcraft King Air 200 / B200; Blackhawk XP42 King Air 200; StandardAero King Air 200; Blackhawk XP42A C-208 Caravan Series (-42A); Piper Meridian (-42A); Thrush S2R-T34; Indonesian Aerospace N-219 |
| PT6A-45 | 1070 | 1020 | |
| PT6A-45R, -45A, -45B | | | |
| PT6A-50 | 1022 | 973 | de Havilland Canada DHC-7 Dash 7 |
| PT6A-52 | 898 | 850 | Beechcraft King Air B200GT / 250; Blackhawk XP52 King Air 200 / B200; Enhanced Aero B200GTO; StandardAero King Air 200 / B200 Piper PA-46 (M700 Fury) |
| PT6A-60, -60A | 1113 | 1050 | Beechcraft Super King Air 300 / 350 |
| PT6A-60AG | 1081 | 1020 | Air Tractor AT-602; Ayres Thrush 550P; Ayres Thrush 660 |
| PT6A-61 | 902 | 850 | Short C-23 Sherpa |
| PT6A-62 | 1008 | 950 | KAI KT-1 / KO-1; Pilatus PC-9 Turbo Trainer |

=== Large ===
Large
| variant | equivalent shaft horsepower (eshp) | shaft horsepower (shp) | applications |
|---|---|---|---|
| PT6A-64 | 747 | 700 | EADS Socata TBM 700 |
| PT6A-65B, -65R | 1249 | 1173 | Beechcraft 1900 / 1900C; Polish Aviation Factory M28 Skytruck |
| PT6A-65AG, -65AR | 1298 | 1220 | Air Tractor AT-602; Air Tractor AT-802 / 802A / 802AF / 802F; Ayres Thrush 660 / 710P; AMI DC-3 (-65R); Dodson International Turbo Dakota DC-3; Shorts 360 Advanced (-65AR) |
| PT6A-65SC | | 1100 | Cessna 408 SkyCourier; LUS-222 |
| PT6A-66, -66A, -66D | 905 | 850 | National Aerospace Laboratories SARAS; Piaggio P.180 Avanti; Ibis Ae270 HP (-66A); Daher TBM 850, 900, 910, 930 and 940 (formerly EADS Socata TBM) (-66D) |
| PT6A-66B, -66T | 1010 | 950 | Piaggio P180 Avanti II (-66B) |
| PT6A-67, -67A, -67B | 1273 | 1200 | Beechcraft RC-12 Guardrail (-67); Beechcraft Starship (-67A); Epic LT (-67A); Epic E1000 (-67A); IAI Heron TP (-67A) |
| PT6A-67B, -67P; PT6E-67XP | 1272 | 1200 | Pilatus PC-12 (-67B); Pilatus PC-12NG (-67P); Pilatus PC-12NGX (PT6E-67XP) |
| PT6A-67D | 1285 | 1214 | Beechcraft 1900D |
| PT6A-67AF, -67AG, -67R, -67T, -67RM | 1294 | 1220 | Air Tractor AT-802 / 802A / 802AF / 802F (-67AG); Ayres Thrush 710P (-67AG); Basler Turbo BT-67 (-67R); Shorts 360 / 360–300 (-67R) |
| PT6A-67E | 1276 | 1200 | |
| PT6A-67F | 1796 | 1700 | Air Tractor AT-802 / 802A / 802AF / 802F |
| PT6A-68 | 1324 | 1250 | T-6A Texan II |
| PT6A-68B, -68C, -68T, -68D | 1691 | 1600 | Pilatus PC-21 (-68B); Embraer EMB-314 Super Tucano (-68C); TAI Hürkuş (-68T) |

T74-CP-700
(PT6A-20) United States military designation for the PT6A-20/27, used in the Beechcraft U-21 Ute.
T74-CP-702
(PT6A-29)
T101
United States military designation for the T101-CP-100 / PT6A-45R, used in the Shorts 330 and Shorts C-23 Sherpa.
PT6B-9
The PT6B-9 is a 550 horsepower (410.1 kilowatts) turboshaft engine for use in helicopters; a later mark of PT6B is rated at 981 horsepower (731.5 kilowatts).
PT6B-16
PT6C
The PT6C is a 1,600 to 2,300 shaft horsepower (1,200 to 1,700 kilowatts) engine for helicopters and tiltrotors.
PT6D-114A
The PT6D-114A is based on the PT6A-114A; the main difference is the deletion of the second-stage reduction gearing and output shaft, because the engine is intended for integration with a combining gearbox incorporating power turbine governors and a propeller output shaft.
Soloy Dual Pac
2x PT6D-114A engines driving a single propeller through a combining gearbox, capable of independent operation.
PT6T
Twin PT6 power units combining outputs through a gearbox for use in helicopters.
ST6
The ST6 is a variant of the PT6 that was originally developed as a powerplant for the UAC TurboTrain power cars, but later developed as a stationary power generator and auxiliary power unit.
ST6B
The ST6B-62 was a 550 brake horsepower (410 kilowatts) version of the PT6 developed for use in the STP-Paxton Turbocar, raced in the 1967 Indianapolis 500.
STN 6/76
The STN 6/76 was a 500 brake horsepower (370 kilowatts) version of the PT6 developed for use in the Lotus 56, raced in the 1968 Indianapolis 500 and later in Formula One races in 1971.

== Applications ==
The engine is used in over 100 different applications.

=== PT6A ===
- AASI Jetcruzer
- Aero Commander 680T (PT6 conversion)
- Aero Ae 270 Ibis
- AHRLAC Holdings Ahrlac
- Air Tractor AT-400
- Air Tractor AT-501
- Air Tractor AT-602
- Air Tractor AT-802
- Antilles Super Goose
- Antonov An-28
- Ayres Turbo Thrush
- Basler BT-67
- Beechcraft 1900
- Beechcraft Model 99
- Beechcraft A36TC Bonanza (turbine conversion)
- Beechcraft C-12 Huron
- Beechcraft King Air
- Beechcraft Lightning
- Beech 18 series (turbine conversion)
- Beechcraft Model 87
- Beechcraft Model 99
- Beechcraft RC-12 Guardrail
- Beechcraft Starship
- Beechcraft Super King Air
- Beechcraft T-6 Texan II
- Beechcraft T-34C Turbo-Mentor
- Beechcraft T-44 Pegasus
- Beechcraft U-21 Ute
- Beriev Be-30K
- Calidus B-250
- CASA C-212 series 300P
- Cessna 208 Caravan
- Cessna P210N (turbine conversion)
- Cessna 404 Titan (turbine conversion)
- Cessna 408 SkyCourier
- Cessna 421C Golden Eagle (turbine conversion)
- Cessna 425 Corsair/Conquest I
- Conair Turbo Firecat
- Conroy Tri-Turbo-Three
- de Havilland Canada DHC-2 Mk. III Turbo Beaver
- de Havilland Canada DHC-2T Turbo Beaver
- de Havilland Canada DHC-3 Otter (turbine conversions)
- de Havilland Canada DHC-6 Twin Otter
- de Havilland Canada Dash 7
- Dominion UV-23 Scout
- Dornier Do 128 Turbo Skyservant
- Dornier Seawings Seastar
- Douglas DC-3 (turbine conversions)
- Epic LT Dynasty
- Epic E1000
- Embraer EMB 110 Bandeirante
- Embraer EMB 121 Xingu
- Embraer EMB 312 Tucano
- Embraer EMB 314 Super Tucano
- Frakes Mohawk 298
- Frakes Turbocat
- Gulfstream American Hustler 400
- Grumman Mallard (turbine conversion)
- Grumman Goose (turbine conversion)
- Harbin Y-12
- Helio AU-24 Stallion
- IAI Arava
- IAI Eitan
- Indonesian Aerospace N-219
- JetPROP DLX
- Kestrel K-350
- KAI KT-1
- L3Harris OA-1 Skyraider II
- Let L-410 Turbolet
- Lancair Evolution
- NAL Saras
- NDN Fieldmaster
- FTS Turbo Firecracker
- PAC 750XL
- PAC Cresco
- Piaggio P.180 Avanti
- Pilatus PC-6/B Turbo-Porter
- Pilatus PC-7
- Pilatus PC-9
- Pilatus PC-12
- Pilatus PC-21
- Piper PA-31P (turbine conversion)
- Piper PA-31T Cheyenne
- Piper PA-42 Cheyenne III
- Piper PA-46-500TP Meridian
- Piper T1040
- PZL-130T Turbo Orlik and PZL-130TC-II Orlik
- PZL M-18 Dromader (turbine conversion)
- PZL M28 Skytruck
- Quest Kodiak
- Reims-Cessna F406 Caravan II
- Saunders ST-27/ST-28
- Scaled Composites ATTT
- Shorts 330
- Shorts 360
- Short C-23 Sherpa
- Socata TBM
- Spectrum SA-550
- Swearingen SA26-T Merlin IIA
- US Aircraft A-67 Dragon
- TAI Hürkuş
- Baykar Bayraktar Akıncı-B

=== PT6B ===
- AgustaWestland AW119 Koala
- Avicopter AC313
- Changhe Z-8F
- Lockheed XH-51
- Sikorsky S-76B
- Westland Lynx 606

=== PT6C ===
- Airbus Helicopters H175/Avicopter Z-15
- AgustaWestland AW139
- AgustaWestland AW609
- Bell UH-1 Global Eagle upgrade

=== PT6D ===
- Soloy Pathfinder 21

=== PT6E ===
- Pilatus PC-12NGX

=== ST6 ===
- Lockheed L1011 TriStar (as an APU)
- STP-Paxton Turbocar Indy racer
- UAC TurboTrain

=== STN ===
- Lotus 56 USAC and Formula One racing car

== Engines on display ==
- New England Air Museum, Connecticut (cutaway)

== Specifications (PT6A-6) ==
Data from Jane's 62-63,

==== General characteristics ====
- Type: Turboprop
- Length: 62 in (1,575 mm)
- Diameter: 19 in (483 mm)
- Dry weight: 270 lb (122.47 kg)

==== Components ====
- Compressor: 3-stage axial + 1-stage centrifugal flow compressor
- Combustors: annular reverse-flow with 14 Simplex burners
- Turbine: 1-stage gas generator power turbine + 1-stage free power turbine
- Fuel type: Aviation kerosene to MIL-F-5624E / JP-4 / JP-5
- Oil system: Split system with gear type pressure and scavenge pumps, with pressure to gearbox boosted by a second pump.

==== Performance ====
- Maximum power output: 578 hp (431 kW) equivalent power at 2,200 output rpm for take-off
- Overall pressure ratio: 6.3:1
- Air mass flow: 5.3 lb/s (2 kg/s)
- Specific fuel consumption: 0.67 lb/hph (0.408 kg/kWh)
- Power-to-weight ratio: 2.14 hp/lb (3.52 kW/kg)

== Gas Turbine Engines ==
Gas Turbine Engines
| model | stages (Note: axial, centrifugal compressor / HP, LP turbine) | power | | SFC /h | | OPR | dia. | leng. | weight | | applications |
| model | stages | hp | kW | lb/hp | g/kW | OPR | dia. | leng. | lb | kg | applications |
|---|---|---|---|---|---|---|---|---|---|---|---|
| PT6A-21 | 3, 1 / 1, 1 | 550 | 410 | 0.63 | 380 | — | 19 in 48 cm | 62 in 1.6 m | 327 | 148 | Beech Bonanza, King Air C90A/B/SE |
| PT6A-25 | 3, 1 / 1, 1 | 550 | 410 | 0.63 | 380 | — | 19 in 48 cm | 62 in 1.6 m | 353 | 160 | Beech T-34C |
| PT6A-25C | 3, 1 / 1, 1 | 750 | 560 | 0.595 | 362 | — | 19 in 48 cm | 62 in 1.6 m | 338 | 153 | Embraer Tucano, Pilatus PC-7, PZL-130 Orlik |
| PT6A-27 | 3, 1 / 1, 1 | 715 | 533 | 0.603 | 367 | — | 19 in 48 cm | 62 in 1.6 m | 289 | 131 | Pilatus PC-6 |
| PT6A-114/A | 3, 1 / 1, 1 | 600–675 | 447–503 | 0.64 | 390 | — | 19 in 48 cm | 62 in 1.6 m | 350 | 160 | Cessna 208 Caravan |
| PT6A-135A | 3, 1 / 1, 1 | 750 | 560 | 0.585 | 356 | 7 | 19 in 48 cm | 62 in 1.6 m | 338 | 153 | Cessna Conquest, Piper Cheyenne, Beech King Air F90 |
| PT6A-42 | 3, 1 / 1, 2 | 850 | 630 | 0.601 | 366 | 8 | 19 in 48 cm | 66.9 in 1.70 m | 403 | 183 | Beech King Air 200/B200, C-12 Huron |
| PT6A-60A | 4, 1 / 1, 2 | 1,050 | 780 | 0.548 | 333 | 8.5 | 19 in 48 cm | 72.5 in 1.84 m | 487 | 221 | Beech Super King Air 300/350 |
| PT6A-64 | 4, 1 / 1, 2 | 700 | 520 | 0.703 | 428 | 8.5 | 19 in 48 cm | 70 in 1.8 m | 456 | 207 | Socata TBM 700 |
| PT6A-66 | 4, 1 / 1, 2 | 850 | 630 | 0.62 | 380 | 9.5 | 19 in 48 cm | 70 in 1.8 m | 456 | 207 | Piaggio P.180 Avanti |
| PT6A-65B | 4, 1 / 1, 2 | 1,100 | 820 | 0.536 | 326 | — | 19 in 48 cm | 74 in 1.9 m | 481 | 218 | Ayres Turbo-Thrush, PZL M28 Skytruck, Beech 1900/C |
| PT6A-67B | 4, 1 / 1, 2 | 1,200 | 890 | 0.546 | 332 | 10.8 | 19 in 48 cm | 74 in 1.9 m | 530 | 240 | Pilatus PC-12 |
| PT6A-67D | 4, 1 / 1, 2 | 1,271 | 948 | 0.546 | 332 | 10.8 | 19 in 48 cm | 74 in 1.9 m | 515 | 234 | Beech 1900D |
| PT6A-68 | 4, 1 / 1, 2 | 1,250 | 930 | 0.54 | 330 | — | 19 in 48 cm | 72.2 in 1.83 m | 572 | 259 | Beech T-6 Texan II |
| PT6A-68B | 4, 1 / 1, 2 | 1,600 | 1,200 | 0.54 | 330 | — | 19 in 48 cm | 72.2 in 1.83 m | 575 | 261 | Pilatus PC-21 |
| PT6B-37A | 3, 1 / 1, 1 | 900 | 670 | 0.584 | 355 | — | 19.5 in 50 cm | 64.4 in 1.64 m | 385 | 175 | Agusta A119 Koala |
| PT6C-67A | 4, 1 / 1, 1 | 1,940 | 1,450 | 0.47 | 290 | — | 22.5 in 57 cm | 59.3 in 1.51 m | — | — | Bell/Agusta BA609 |
| PT6C-67C | 4, 1 / 1, 2 | 1,100 | 820 | 0.49 | 300 | — | 22.5 in 57 cm | 59.3 in 1.51 m | — | — | Agusta A 139 |
| PT6T-3B/BF | 2 × 3, 1 / 1, 1 | 1,800 | 1,300 | 0.6 | 360 | — | 43.5 in 110 cm | 65.8 in 1.67 m | 668 | 303 | Bell 412/SP/HP/EP |
| PT6T-3D/DF | 2 × 3, 1 / 1, 1 | 1,800 | 1,300 | 0.595 | 362 | — | 43.5 in 110 cm | 65.8 in 1.67 m | 692–681 | 314–309 | Bell 412/SP/HP/EP |
| PT6T-6 | 2 × 3, 1 / 1, 1 | 1,875 | 1,398 | 0.591 | 359 | — | 43.5 in 110 cm | 65.8 in 1.67 m | 660 | 300 | Bell 212, 412/SP/HP/EP, Sikorsky S-58T |
| PT6T-68 | 2 × 3, 1 / 1, 1 | 1,970 | 1,470 | 0.591 | 359 | — | 43.5 in 110 cm | 65.8 in 1.67 m | 665 | 302 | Bell 412HP |

== See also ==
Related development

- Pratt & Whitney Canada PT6T
- Pratt & Whitney Canada PT9

Comparable engines

- Garrett TPE331
- General Electric Catalyst
- HAL HTSE-1200
- Klimov VK-800
- Walter M601

Related lists

- List of aircraft engines
