= Pratt & Whitney Canada =

Aircraft engine manufacturer

- Type: Division
- Industry: Aerospace
- Founded: November 1928; 97 years ago
- Headquarters: Longueuil, Quebec, Canada
- Key people: Satheeshkumar Kumarasingam (president)
- Number of employees: 10,000
- Parent: Pratt & Whitney
- Website: www.prattwhitney.com

Pratt & Whitney Canada (PWC or P&WC) is a Canada-based aircraft engine manufacturer. PWC's headquarters are in Longueuil, Quebec, south of Montreal. It is a division of the larger US-based Pratt & Whitney (P&W), itself a business unit of RTX Corporation. United Technologies had given PWC a world mandate for small and medium aircraft engines, while P&W's US operations develop and manufacture larger engines.

Although PWC is a division of P&W, it does its own research, development and marketing as well as the manufacturing of its engines. The company currently has about 10,000 employees worldwide, with 6,000 of them in Canada.

== History ==
The Canadian Pratt & Whitney Aircraft Company, Ltd. was founded in November 1928 to act as a service centre for P&W aircraft engines. During World War II, it assembled Pratt & Whitney Wasp series engines built in the U.S. In 1952, the production of Wasp engines was transferred to Canadian Pratt & Whitney so P&W could concentrate on developing jet engines.

In the late 1950s, a team of 12 Canadian Pratt & Whitney engineers began the development of the first small turbine engine in Canada, the PT6. The first example was delivered to a customer in 1963. In 1962, the company was renamed United Aircraft of Canada (UAC), and assumed its current name in 1975. In 1963 a total of 41 Sikorsky CH-124 Sea King (originally CHSS-2) helicopters were delivered to the Royal Canadian Navy. The airframe components were made in Connecticut by another United Aircraft subsidiary, Sikorsky, but most of the aircraft were assembled by UAC in Longueuil, Quebec.

Its 100,000th engine was produced in May 2017, its fleet logged 730 million flight hours and 60,000 in-service engines are operated by 12,300 customers in more than 200 countries.

== Products ==
=== Engines ===
Model name	Configuration	Power
Pratt & Whitney JT12 (Note: Transferred to the American parent company, following initial design.)	Turbojet	12.9 to 18 kN
Pratt & Whitney Canada JT15D	Turbofan	9.8 to 14.2 kN
Pratt & Whitney Canada PT6	Turboprop/Turboshaft	430 to 1450 kW
Pratt & Whitney Canada PT6T	Turboshaft	1300 kW
Pratt & Whitney Canada PW100	Turboprop	1100 to 3781 kW
Pratt & Whitney Canada PW200	Turboshaft	321 to 820 kW
Pratt & Whitney Canada PW300	Turbofan	20.8 to 31.1 kN
Pratt & Whitney Canada PW500	Turbofan	12.8 to 19 kN
Pratt & Whitney Canada PW600	Turbofan	4.2 to 8.4 kN
Pratt & Whitney Canada PW800	Turbofan	39 to 69.7 kN
Pratt & Whitney Canada PW900	APU family	

==== Next Generation Regional Turboprop ====
Next Generation Regional Turboprop

By 2017, PWC was developing a new engine, the Next Generation Regional Turboprop, scalable from 4,500 to 8,000 shp (3,400 to 6,000 kW) for 90-seaters and featuring a new compressor, state-of-the-art propeller and nacelle among technologies, materials and manufacturing processes improvements to deliver 20% better fuel efficiency and 20% less maintenance costs than the PW100. The high-efficiency compressor testing began in 2012 and ran the full range of aerodynamic design points to validate the component efficiency and pressure ratio. Compressor tests were successfully completed in 2016 and Hot-section technology was to be adapted from the PW1000G. PWC targeted 2023-25 for its introduction, and it was to halve operating cost per shaft horsepower.

=== Aircraft ===
- Sikorsky CH-124 Sea King - primary assembly

== Fleet ==
As of February 2023, Pratt & Whitney Canada has the following aircraft registered with Transport Canada and operate as ICAO airline designator PWC, and telephony PRATT.

- Boeing 747SP - 2
- Cessna 560XLS - 1
- De Havilland Canada Dash 8 - 1
- Dornier 328JET (328–300) - 1
