= Air Tractor AT-500 family =

Family of agricultural aircraft

AT-500 family
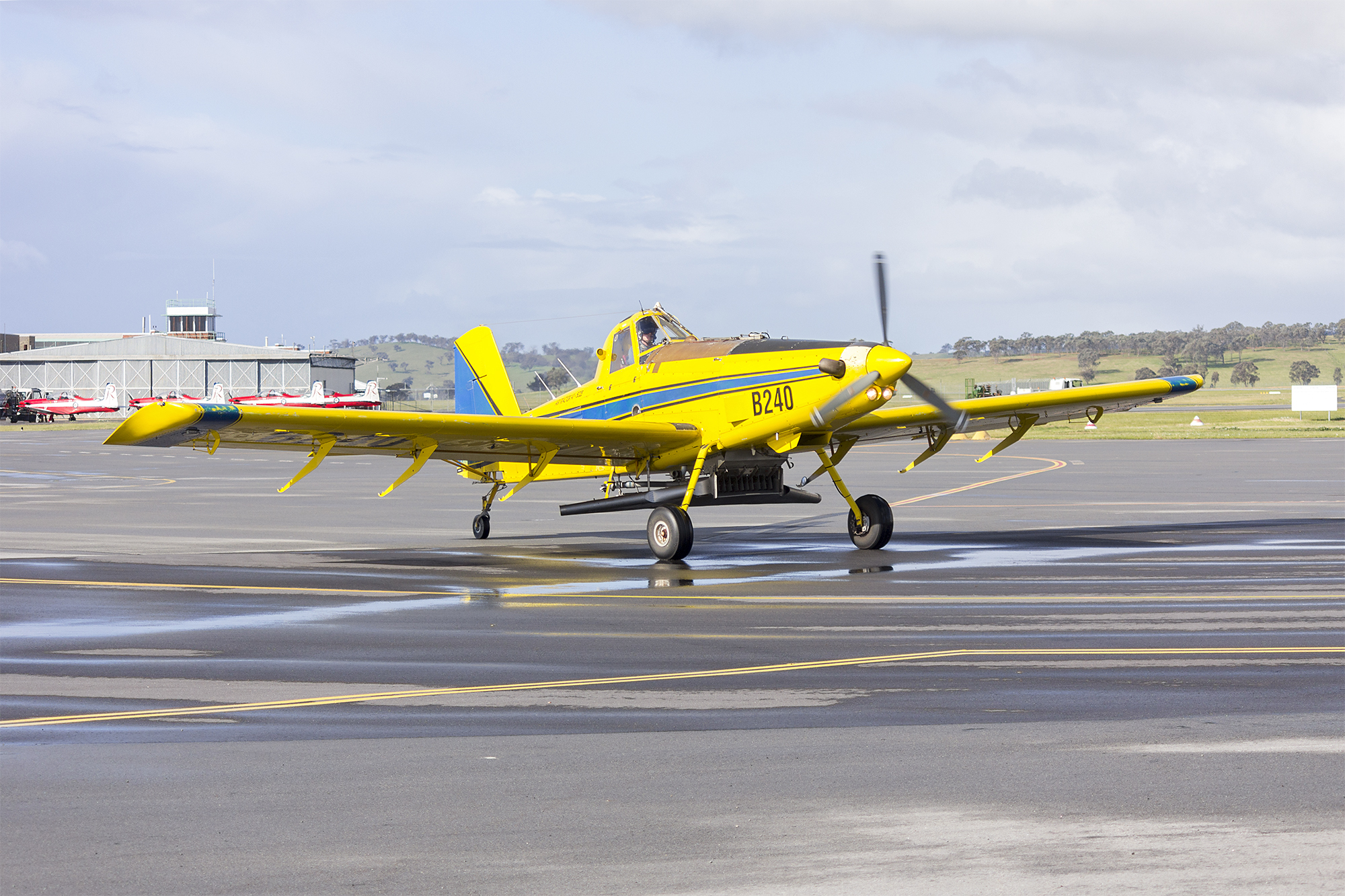
- Air Tractor AT-502B

General information
- Type: Agricultural aircraft
- Manufacturer: Air Tractor
- Status: Active, in production

History
- Manufactured: 1986-present
- First flight: 25 April 1986

The Air Tractor AT-500 is a family of agricultural aircraft that first flew in the United States on 25 April 1986, manufactured by Air Tractor Inc. Of monoplane low-wing, taildragger configuration, they carry a chemical hopper between the engine firewall and the cockpit. Compared with their predecessor, the AT-500 family featured a wingspan increase of 50 inches (127 cm), and an additional fuselage stretch of 22 inches (56 cm), allowing for a larger chemical hopper. Almost all variants offer a widened "buddy" seat or a tandem seat for a passenger, observer, or loader; trainer aircraft with full dual controls have also been offered.

From 2011 through 2018, the AT-502B was the world's top-selling agricultural aircraft with 388 deliveries, while the combined AT-500 line (AT-502A, -502B, and -504) was among the world's most popular fixed wing general aviation single-turboprop aircraft families, with 470 delivered—a total exceeded only by the Pilatus PC-12 and the Cessna 208 Caravan family during that time.

== Variants ==
AT-500
Prototype
AT-501
Piston-powered version with 600 shp (450 kW) Pratt & Whitney R-1340 engine, one seat, gross weight of 6,500 lb (2,900 kg)
AT-502
Upgraded AT-501 with 680 shp (510 kW) Pratt & Whitney Canada PT6A-15AG or 750 shp (560 kW) PT6A-34AG engine, one or two seats, gross weight of 6,500 lb (2,900 kg) or 8,000 lb (3,600 kg) depending on production date and wing spar type
AT-502A
Hot and high version of AT-502 with 1,100 shp (820 kW) PT6A-65AG or 1,050 shp (780 kW) PT6A-60AG engine, one or two seats in tandem or side-by-side arrangement, gross weight of 8,000 lb (3,600 kg)
AT-502B
Main production version, development of AT-502 with 750 shp (560 kW) PT6A-34AG engine, one or two seats in tandem or side-by-side arrangement, gross weight of 8,000 lb (3,600 kg)
AT-502XP
Updated AT-502A with 867 shp (647 kW) PT6A-140AG engine
AT-503
Production version with 1,100 shp (820 kW) PT6A-45R engine, tandem seats, gross weight of 8,000 lb (3,600 kg)
AT-503A
AT-503 with 750 shp (560 kW) PT6A-34AG engine, tandem seats dual controls, AT-501 wings
AT-503T
Dual-control trainer version of AT-503 with shorter AT-401 wings, tandem seats
AT-504
Dual-control trainer version of AT-502B with side-by-side seating, replaced tandem-seat AT-503 trainers, introduced 2009

== Specifications (AT-502B) ==
Data from Jane's All The World's Aircraft 1988-89

General characteristics

- Crew: Two
- Capacity: *500 US gal (420 imp gal; 1,900 L) hopper
- 5,830 lb (2,640 kg) payload
- Length: 33 ft 6 in (10.21 m)
- Wingspan: 52 ft 0 in (15.85 m)
- Height: 9 ft 9 1/2 in (2.985 m)
- Wing area: 288.0 sq ft (26.76 m^{2})
- Aspect ratio: 8.0:1
- Airfoil: NACA 4415
- Empty weight: 4,650 lb (2,109 kg)
- Max takeoff weight: 10,480 lb (4,754 kg)
- Fuel capacity: 260 US gal (220 imp gal; 980 L)
- Powerplant: 1 × Pratt & Whitney PT6A-34AG turboprop, 750 shp (560 kW)
- Propellers: 3-bladed Hartzell constant-speed propeller, 9 ft 3 in (2.82 m) diameter

Performance

- Maximum speed: 154 mph (248 km/h, 134 kn) at sea level
- Cruise speed: 130 mph (210 km/h, 110 kn) (ferry speed)
- Stall speed: 69 mph (111 km/h, 60 kn) (power off, flaps down) at maximum landing weight
- Range: 800 mi (1,300 km, 700 nmi)
- Service ceiling: 36,000 ft (11,000 m)
- Rate of climb: 3,500 ft/min (18 m/s)
