= Air Tractor AT-300 =

Agricultural aircraft

AT-300 family
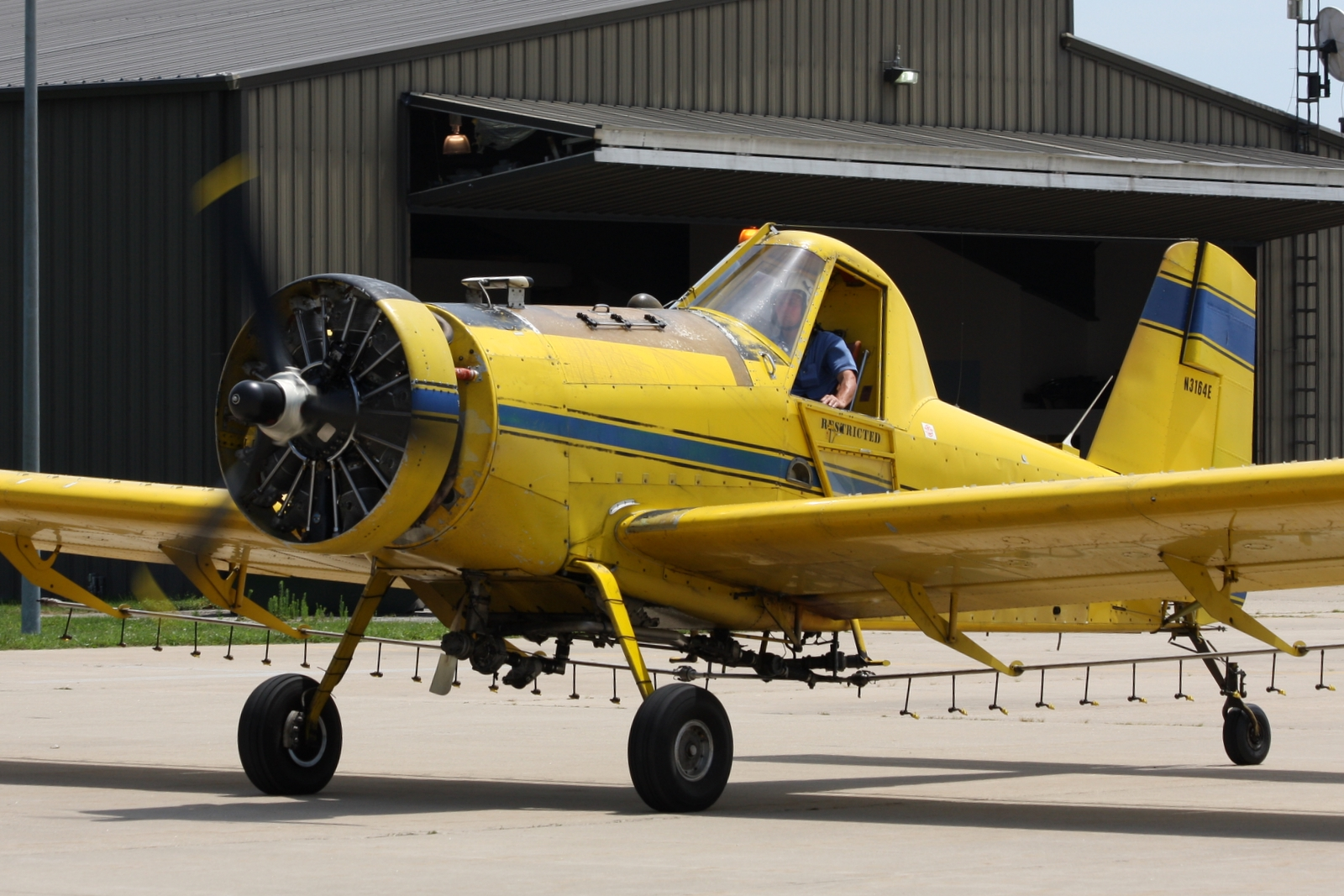
- AT-301

General information
- Type: Agricultural aircraft
- Manufacturer: Air Tractor
- Status: Active

History
- Manufactured: 1973-present
- Introduction date: 1976
- First flight: 1973

The Air Tractor AT-300 is a family of agricultural aircraft that first flew in the United States in September 1973. Type certification was awarded to Air Tractor in November the same year, and serial production commenced in 1976. Of low-wing monoplane taildragger configuration, they carry a chemical hopper between the engine firewall and the cockpit.

== Variants ==
- AT-300 - prototype and initial production models - powered by 460 hp (340 kW) Pratt & Whitney R-985 engine and 320 US gal (270 imp gal; 1,200 L) hopper.
- AT-301 - powered by 800 hp (600 kW) Pratt & Whitney R-1340 engine.
  - AT-301B - AT-301 with 350 US gal (290 imp gal; 1,300 L) hopper.
- AT-302 - turboprop version with 600 shp (450 kW) Lycoming LTP101 engine.
  - AT-302A - AT-302 with 385 US gal (321 imp gal; 1,460 L) hopper.

== Specifications (AT-301A) ==
Data from Jane's All The World's Aircraft 1988–89

General characteristics

- Crew: 1
- Capacity: 320 US gal (270 imp gal; 1,200 L) hopper
- Length: 27 ft 0 in (8.23 m)
- Wingspan: 45 ft 1 1/4 in (13.748 m)
- Height: 8 ft 6 in (2.59 m)
- Wing area: 270 sq ft (25 m^{2})
- Aspect ratio: 7.5:1
- Airfoil: NACA 4415
- Empty weight: 3,800 lb (1,724 kg) (spray equipped)
- Gross weight: 7,400 lb (3,357 kg)
- Fuel capacity: 126 US gal (105 imp gal; 480 L)
- Powerplant: 1 × Pratt & Whitney R-1340 radial engine, 600 hp (450 kW)
- Propellers: 2-bladed Hamilton Standard 12D40/6101A-12 constant-speed propeller, 9 ft 1 in (2.77 m) diameter

Performance

- Maximum speed: 168 mph (270 km/h, 146 kn) at sea level
- Cruise speed: 120–140 mph (190–230 km/h, 100–120 kn) (typical working speed)
- Stall speed: 56 mph (90 km/h, 49 kn) (normal landing weight)
- Range: 540 mi (870 km, 470 nmi)
- Rate of climb: 1,600 ft/min (8.1 m/s)

== See also ==
Comparable aircraft:

- Aero Boero 260AG
- Air Tractor AT-802
- Ayres Thrush
- CallAir A-9
- Cessna 188 AgWagon
- Embraer EMB-202 "Ipanema"
- Grumman Ag Cat
- PZL-106 Kruk
- PZL-Mielec M-18 Dromader
- Zlin Z-37 Čmelák
