= Conair Firecat =

Fire-fighting aircraft

Firecat, Turbo Firecat
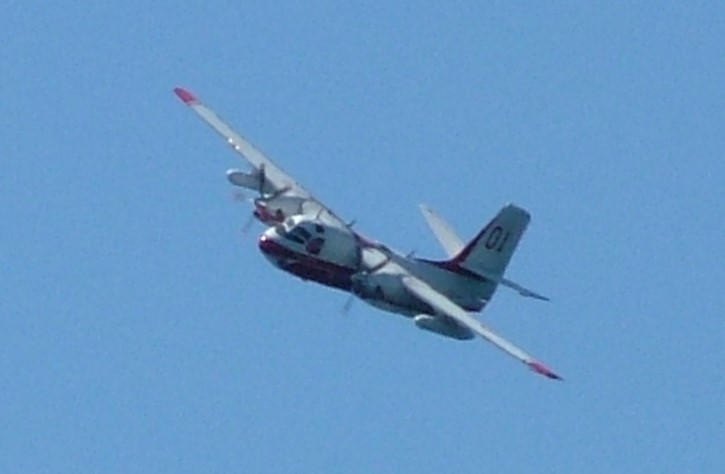
- A French Turbo Firecat over Sausset-Les-Pins

General information
- Type: Fire-fighting aircraft
- National origin: Canada
- Manufacturer: Conair
- Primary users: Conair Sécurité Civile
- Number built: 35

History
- Introduction date: 1978 (Firecat); 1988 (Turbo Firecat)
- Retired: Retired in Canada 2012, Retired in France in 2020
- Developed from: Grumman S-2 Tracker

The Conair Firecat is a fire-fighting aircraft developed in Canada in the 1970s by modifying military surplus Grumman S-2 Trackers. The modifications were developed by the maintenance arm of the Conair Group, which became a separate company called Cascade Aerospace.

== Development ==
The Firecats are retrofitted Grumman S-2 Trackers. Conair bought a large number of Trackers formerly operated by the Canadian Navy and a small number of ex-United States Navy aircraft as well. The Trackers are modified for aerial firefighting as Firecats by raising the cabin floor by 20 cm (8 in) and fitting a 3,296-litre (870 U.S. gal) retardant tank where the torpedo bay is normally located. All superfluous military equipment is removed and the empty weight is almost 1,500 kg lower than a Tracker's. The first aircraft was modified in 1978. Some examples have been re-engined with turboprop engines and are known as Turbo Firecats, these feature a larger tank and extra underwing fuel tanks; the Maximum Take Off Weight (MTOW) is increased by 680 kg (1,500 lb) to 12,480 kg (27,500 lb), while the lighter turbine engines also reduce the empty weight. The first Turbo Firecat was produced in 1988.

== Operational history ==
Conair commenced Firecat operations in 1978. Firecats and Turbo Firecats were previously in service with Conair and the Government of Saskatchewan in Canada and were also used by the Government of Ontario. The Sécurité Civile organisation in France took delivery of 14 Firecats over a period of five years commencing in May 1982. It has had its examples further converted and is now standardized on the Turbo Firecat. A total of 35 Firecat and Turbo Firecat conversions have been performed; four Firecats and three Turbo Firecats have crashed in France. In 2020 Turbo Firecats were retired for Sécurité Civile in France.

Similar conversions are performed by another company Marsh Aviation in the United States. These are known as Marsh Turbo Trackers and feature Garrett AiResearch TPE-331 turboprop engines.

== Variants ==
Firecat
Original version, fitted with Wright R-1820 radial piston engines as fitted to standard Grumman Trackers

Turbo Firecat
Version fitted with two Pratt & Whitney Canada PT6A-67AF turboprop engines

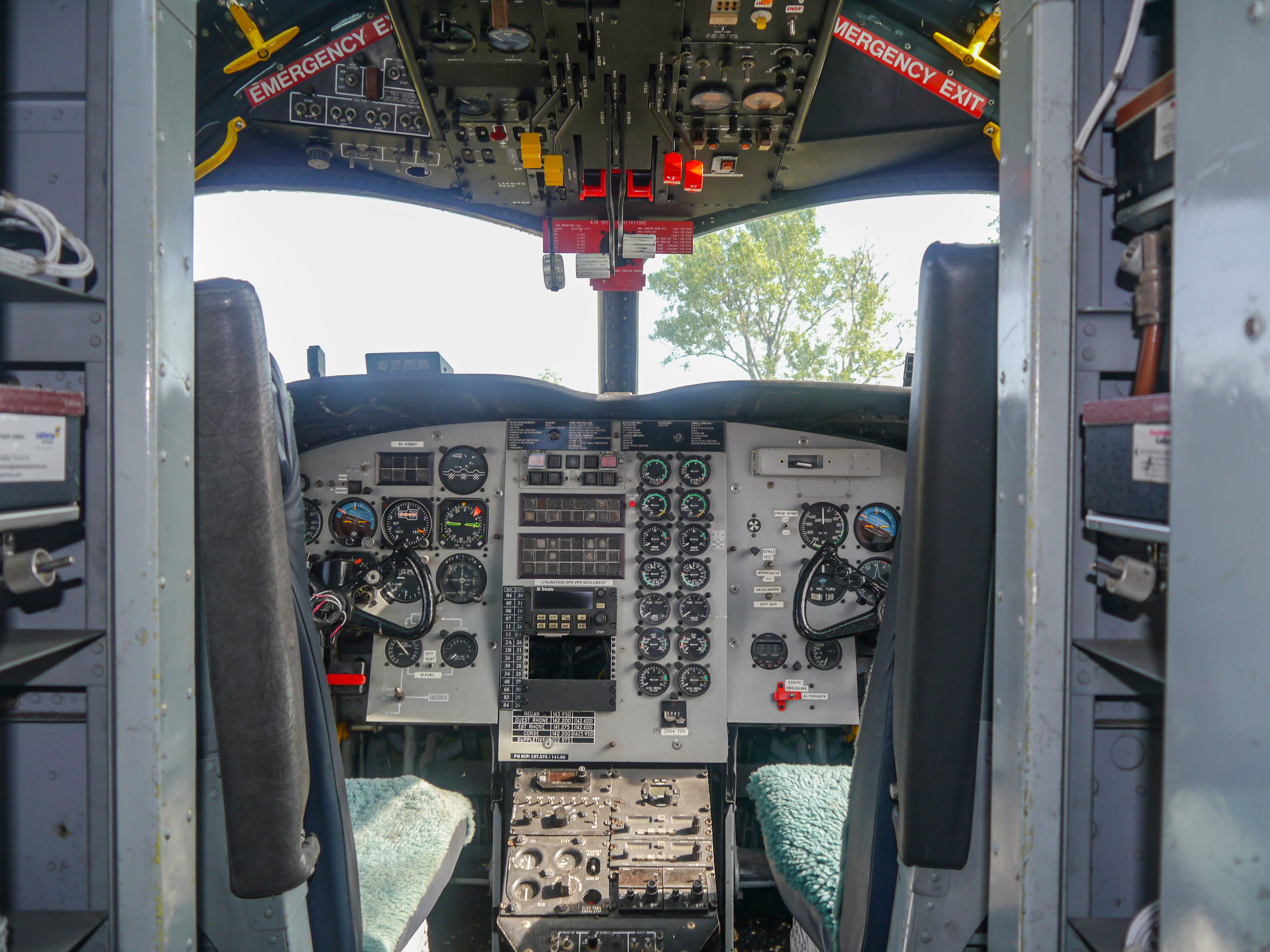
Turbo Firecat cockpit.

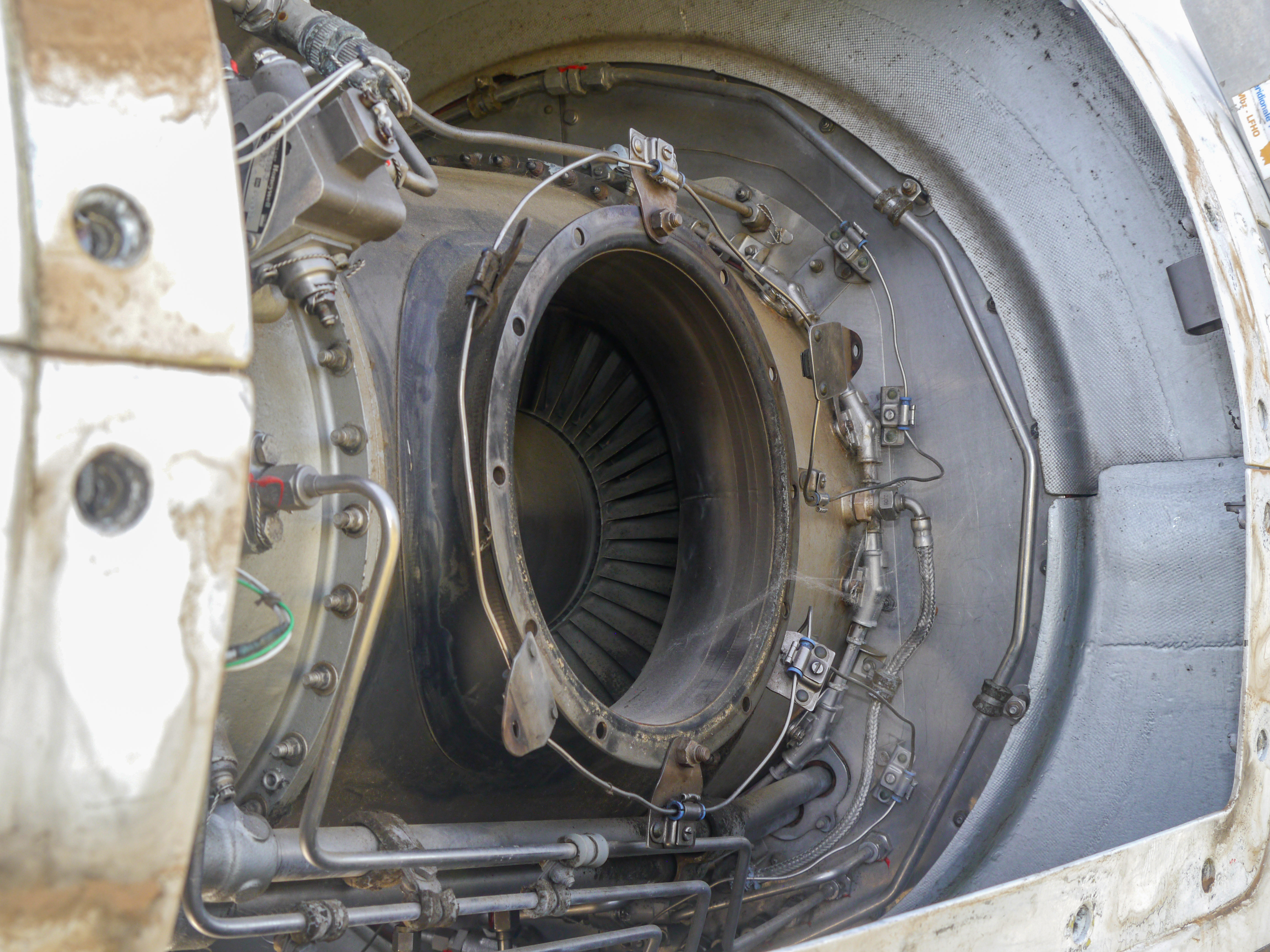
PT6 on Turbo Firecat.

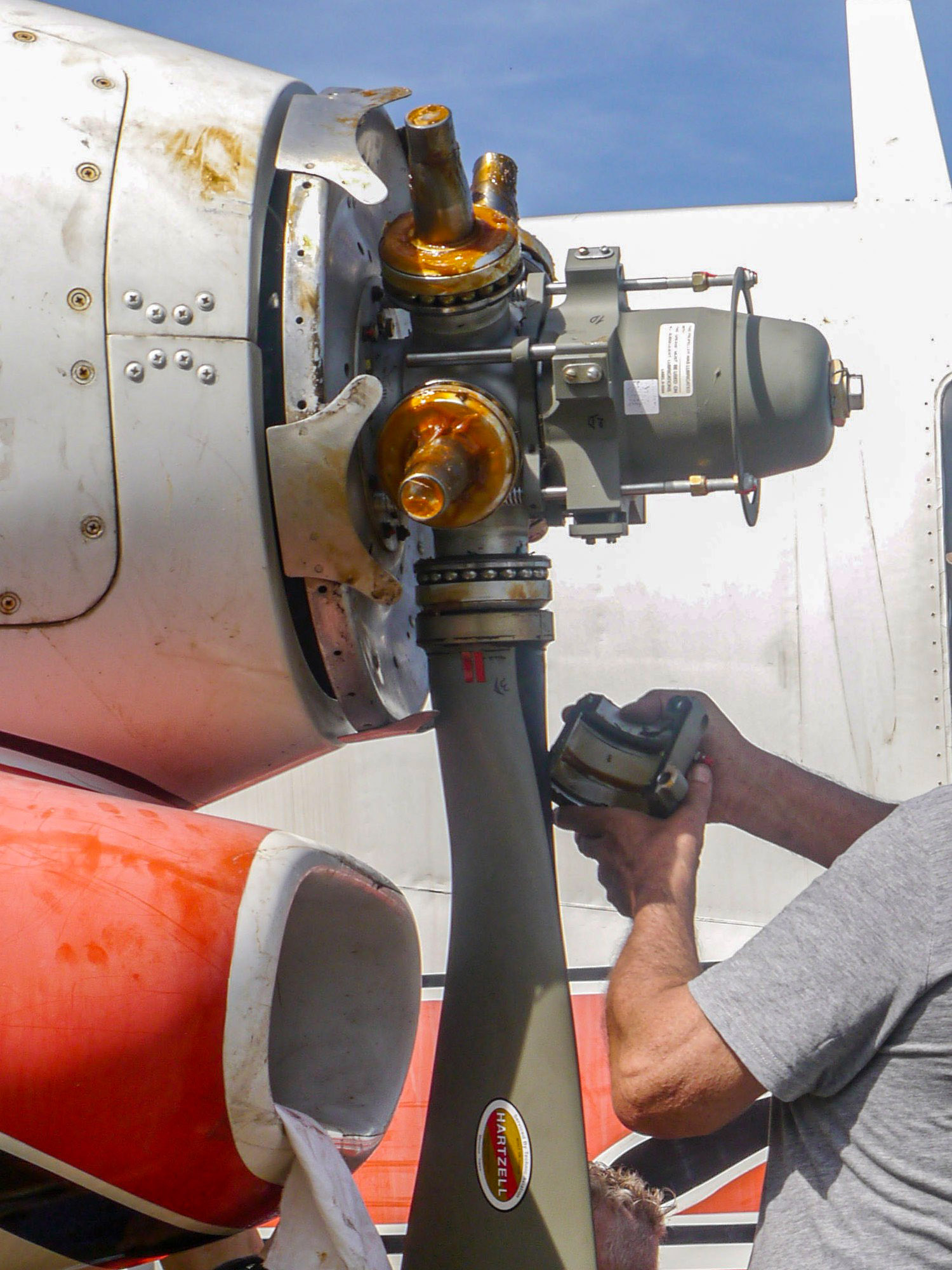
Propeller assembly.

== Aircraft on display ==
Place	Type	Registration	Notes
Canadian Museum of Flight	Firecat	C-FOPU	Aviation Museum
Musée Reynolds-Alberta	Firecat	C-GABC	Aviation, agriculture and industry museum
Albert-Picardie Airport	TurboFirecat	F-AYFT	From the Sécurité Civile, also displayed in air shows
Musée de l'Aviation de Saint-Victoret	Firecat	F-ZBAU	From the Sécurité Civile, kept in an aviation museum
Aubenas Airfield	TurboFirecat	F-ZBEY	From the Sécurité Civile
Ailes Anciennes Toulouse	TurboFirecat	F-ZBAZ	From the Sécurité Civile, it was the first TurboTracker to be converted into a water bomber for the French

== Specifications (Turbo Firecat) ==
General characteristics

- Crew: 1
- Capacity: 3,395 L (897 U.S. gal) of water, plus 173 L (46 U.S. gal) of foam concentrate
- Length: 13.26 m (43 ft 6 in)
- Wingspan: 22.12 m (72 ft 7 in)
- Height: 5.05 m (16 ft 7 in)
- Empty weight: 6,803 kg (15,000 lb)
- Gross weight: 12,473 kg (27,500 lb)
- Powerplant: 2 × Pratt & Whitney Canada PT6A-67AF , 761 kW (1,220 hp) each

Performance

- Maximum speed: 407 km/h (253 mph, 220 kn)
- Endurance: 5 hours 6 minutes

== See also ==
Related development

- S-2 Tracker
