= Grumman S-2 Tracker =

Family of carrier-borne anti-submarine and maritime patrol aircraft

S2F/S-2 Tracker
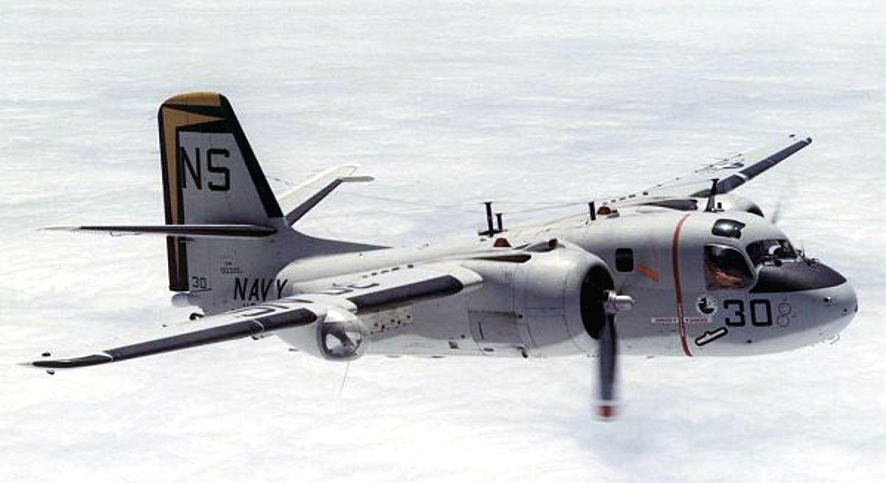
- An S-2E from VS-29

General information
- Type: Anti-submarine warfare aircraft
- National origin: United States
- Manufacturer: Grumman
- Status: retired
- Primary users: United States Navy (historical) Royal Canadian Navy (historical); Royal Australian Navy (historical); Argentine Navy (historical)
- Number built: 1,284

History
- Introduction date: February 1954
- First flight: 4 December 1952
- Retired: 2025
- Variant: Conair Firecat
- Developed into: Grumman C-1 Trader; Grumman E-1 Tracer

The Grumman S-2 Tracker (S2F prior to 1962) is the first purpose-built, single airframe anti-submarine warfare (ASW) aircraft to enter service with the United States Navy. Designed and initially built by Grumman, the Tracker was of conventional design — propeller-driven with twin radial engines, a high wing that could be folded for storage on aircraft carriers, and tricycle undercarriage. The type was exported to a number of navies around the world. Introduced in 1952, the Tracker and its E-1 Tracer derivative saw service in the U.S. Navy until the mid-1970s, and its C-1 Trader derivative until the mid-1980s, with a few aircraft remaining in service with other air arms into the 21st century. Argentina was the last country to operate the Tracker, with the last two Trackers being taken out of service on 19 November 2025.

== Design and development ==
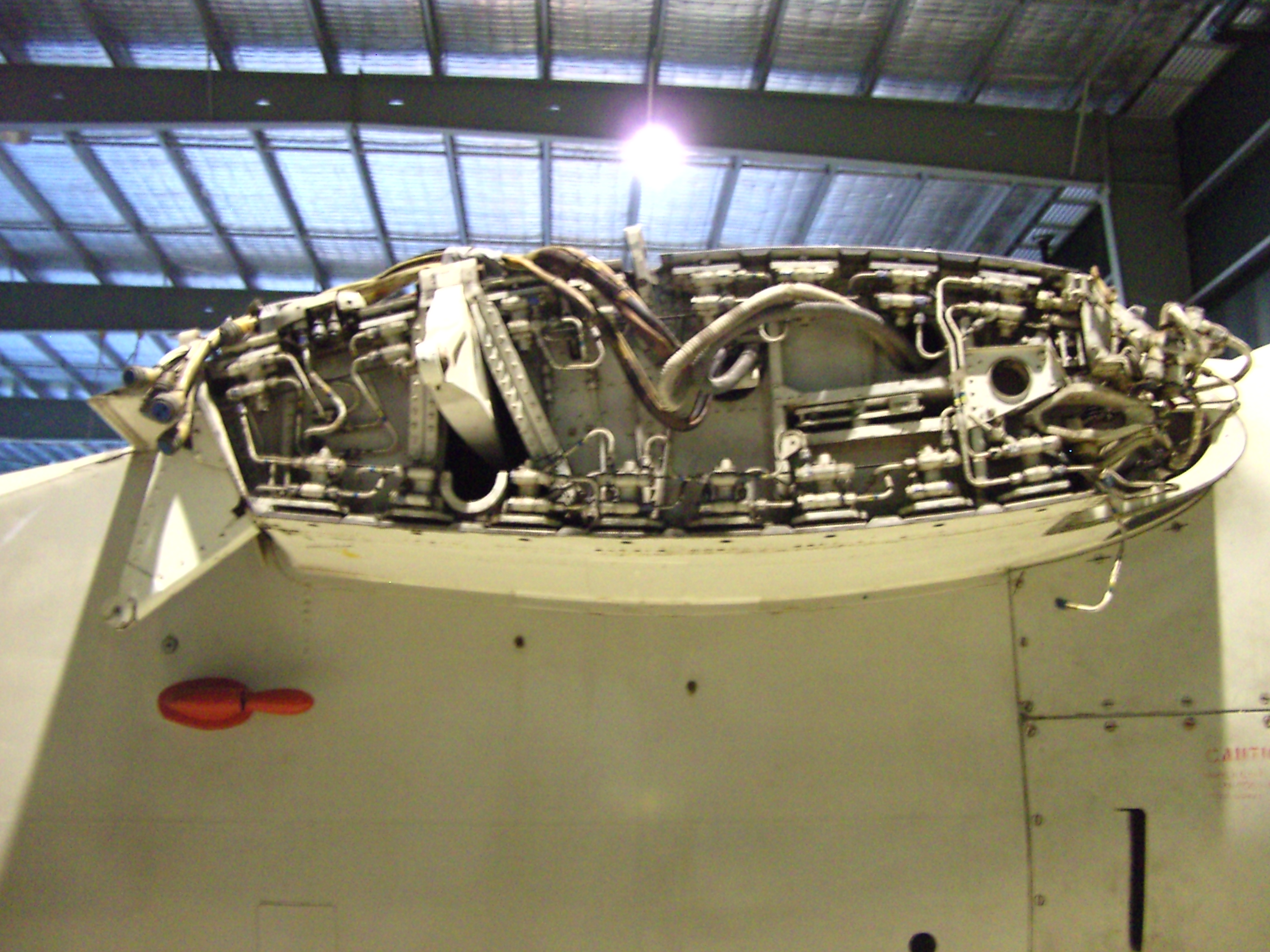
Starboard wing root and fold mechanism with wing removed

The Tracker was intended as a replacement for the Grumman AF Guardian, which was the first purpose-built aircraft system for anti-submarine warfare. The Guardian operated in two aircraft "hunter-killer" pairs, with one aircraft (the AF2-W) carrying the detection gear to find the submarine and to direct the second aircraft, the AF-2S, which carried weapons to attack and destroy the submarine. The Tracker combined both functions in one aircraft, saving deck space aboard carriers and making for more efficient operations. Grumman's design (model G-89) was for a large high-wing monoplane with twin Wright Cyclone R-1820 nine cylinder radial engines, a yoke type arrestor hook and a crew of four. Both the two XS2F-1 prototypes and 15 S2F-1 production aircraft were ordered at the same time, on 30 June 1950. The first flight was conducted on 4 December 1952, and production aircraft entered service with VS-26, in February 1954.

Follow-on versions included the WF Tracer and TF Trader, which became the Grumman E-1 Tracer and Grumman C-1 Trader in the tri-service designation standardization of 1962. The S-2 carried the nickname "Stoof" (S-two-F) throughout its military career; and the E-1 Tracer variant with the large overhead radome was colloquially called the "stoof with a roof.".

Grumman produced 1,185 Trackers and another 99 aircraft carrying the CS2F designation were manufactured in Canada under license by de Havilland Canada. U.S.-built versions of the Tracker were sold to various nations, including Australia, Japan, Turkey and Taiwan.

=== Sensors and armament ===
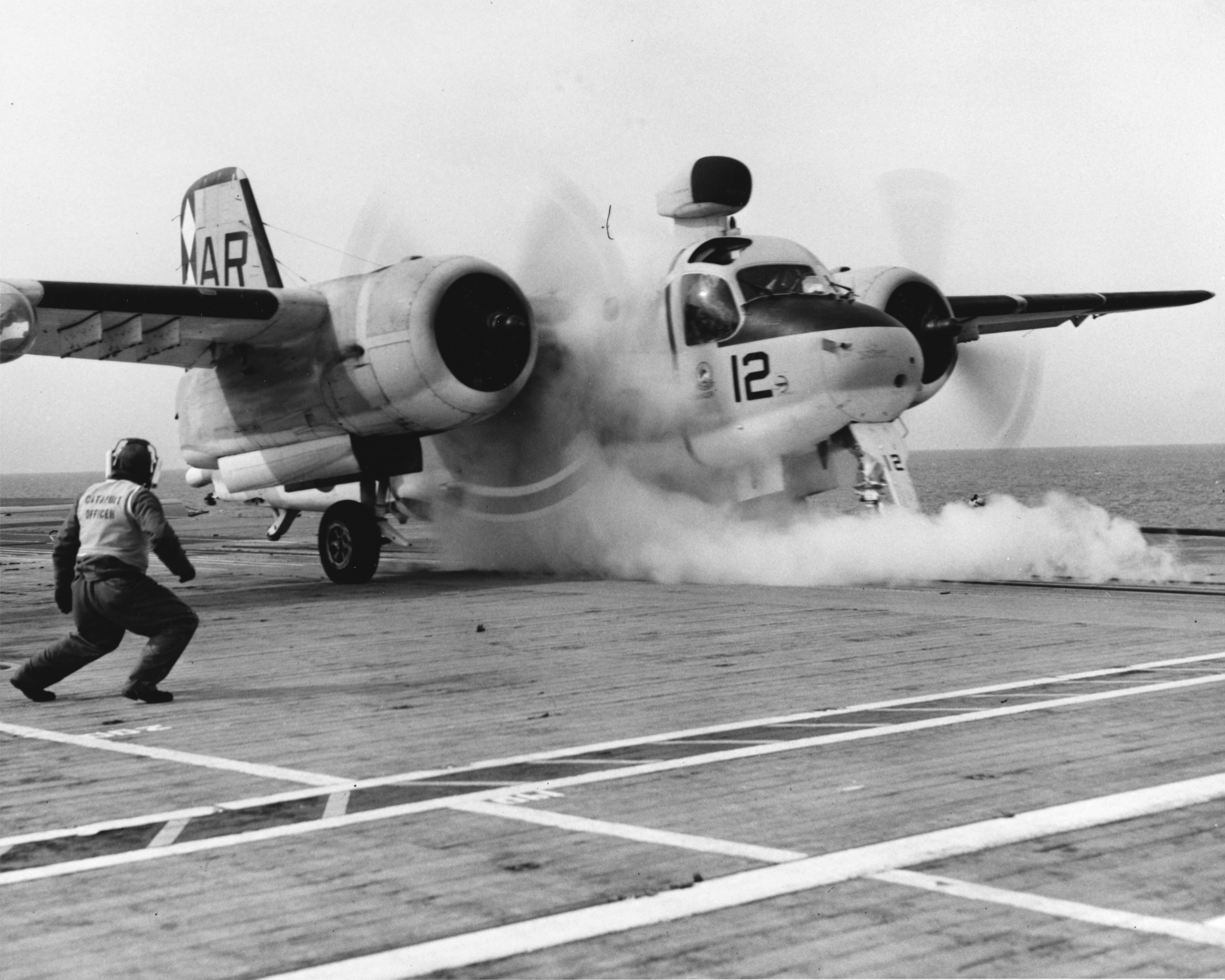
U.S. Navy S-2 Tracker on the port catapult of USS Lexington ready for take-off, 22 January 1963

The Tracker had an internal torpedo bay capable of carrying two lightweight aerial torpedoes or one nuclear depth charge. There were six underwing hard points for rocket pods and conventional depth charges or up to four additional torpedoes. A ventrally-mounted retractable radome for AN/APS-38 radar and a Magnetic Anomaly Detector (MAD) AN/ASQ-8 mounted on an extendable rear mounted boom were also fitted. Early model Trackers had an Electronic Support Measures (ESM) pod mounted dorsally just aft of the front seat overhead hatches and were also fitted with a smoke particle detector or "sniffer" for detecting exhaust particles from diesel-electric submarines running on snorkel. Later S-2s had the sniffer removed and had the ESM antennae moved to four rounded extensions on the wingtips. A 70-million-candlepower searchlight was mounted on the starboard wing. The engine nacelles carried JEZEBEL sonobuoys in the rear (16 in early marks, 32 in the S-2E/G). Early Trackers also carried 60 explosive charges, dispensed ventrally from the rear of the fuselage and used to create sound pulses for semi-active sonar (JULIE) with the AN/AQA-3 and later AQA-4 detection sets, whereas the introduction of active sonobuoys (pingers) and AN/AQA-7 with the S-2G conversion saw these removed. Smoke dispensers were mounted on the port ventral surface of the nacelles in groups of three each.

== Operational history ==
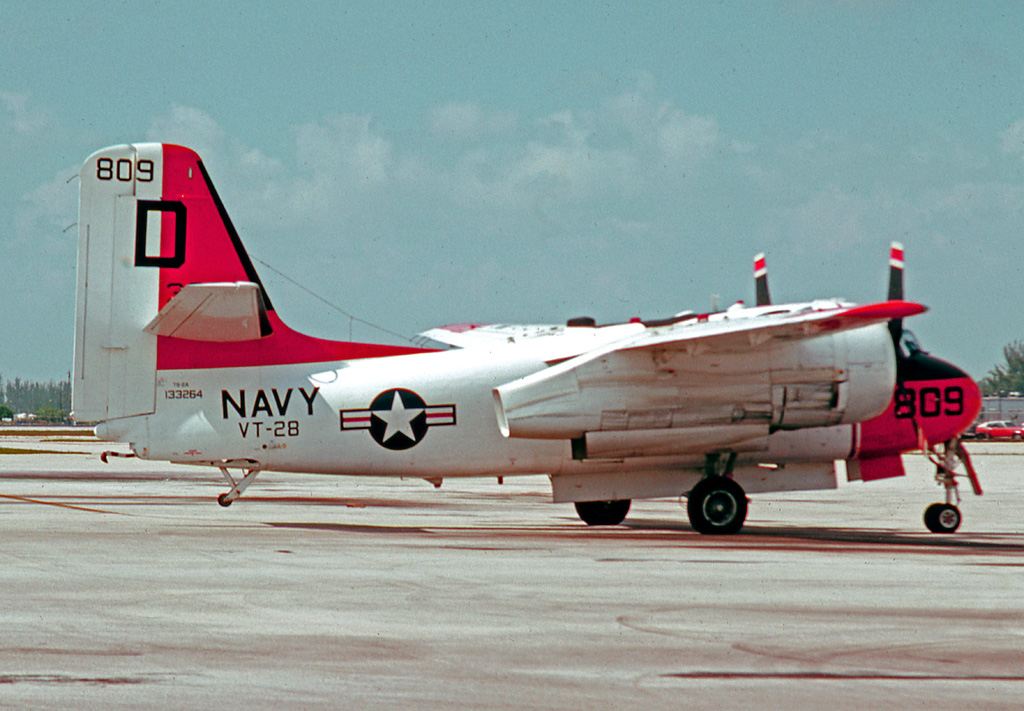
A TS-2A aircrew training version of the Tracker in 1976

The Tracker was eventually superseded in U.S. military service by the Lockheed S-3 Viking; the last USN Tracker operational squadron (VS-37 with S-2G models) was disestablished in 1976. The last Navy S-2 was withdrawn from service on 29 August 1976. For many years the TS-2A version of the Tracker was used by U.S. Navy training units, culminating with its use by Training Squadron 27 (VT-27), Training Squadron 28 (VT-28) and Training Squadron 31 (VT-31) for Student Naval Aviator training in the multi-engine pipeline with Training Air Wing FOUR (TRAWING 4) at Naval Air Station Corpus Christi, Texas.

A number of Trackers live on as firefighting aircraft while the design also continued to provide excellent service with the naval forces of other countries for years after the U.S. retired them. For example, the Royal Australian Navy continued to use Trackers as front line ASW assets until the mid-1980s.

=== Argentina ===
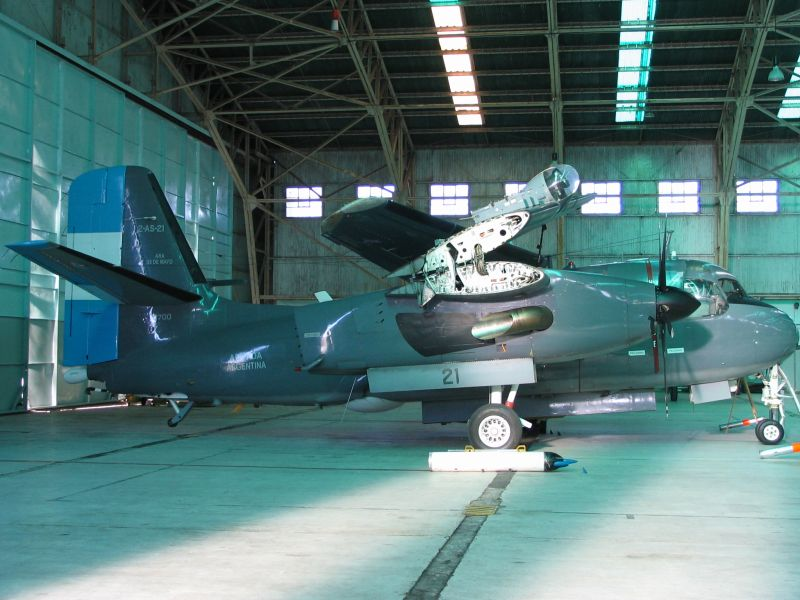
Argentine S-2T Turbo Tracker in hangar with wings folded.

Argentine Naval Aviation received seven S-2As in 1962, six S-2Es in 1978, and three S-2Gs in the 1990s. They were operated from both aircraft carriers, ARA Independencia and ARA Veinticinco de Mayo, and used in the carrier onboard delivery (COD) (US-2A conversions,) maritime patrol, and ASW roles. They were extensively used in the 1982 Falklands War, first from ARA Veinticinco de Mayo, from where they detected the British task force on 1 May 1982 in the failed naval strike attempt carried by Argentinean Naval forces, and then from the mainland when the carrier returned to port after the sinking of the cruiser ARA General Belgrano, During that trip back to port the S-2E carried ASW sorties including the attack of submarine contacts with aerial torpedoes. In the 1990s, six remaining airframes were refurbished by Israel Aerospace Industries with turboprop engines as S-2T Turbo Trackers. As of 2010, with the retirement of Argentina's only aircraft carrier, the Trackers were deployed on board Brazilian Navy aircraft carrier São Paulo. and with U.S. Navy aircraft carriers during Gringo-Gaucho maneuvers. As of 2023, at least one S-2T was reported still operational in the maritime surveillance role. The last Argentine S-2T was formally retired on 1 December 2025.

=== Australia ===
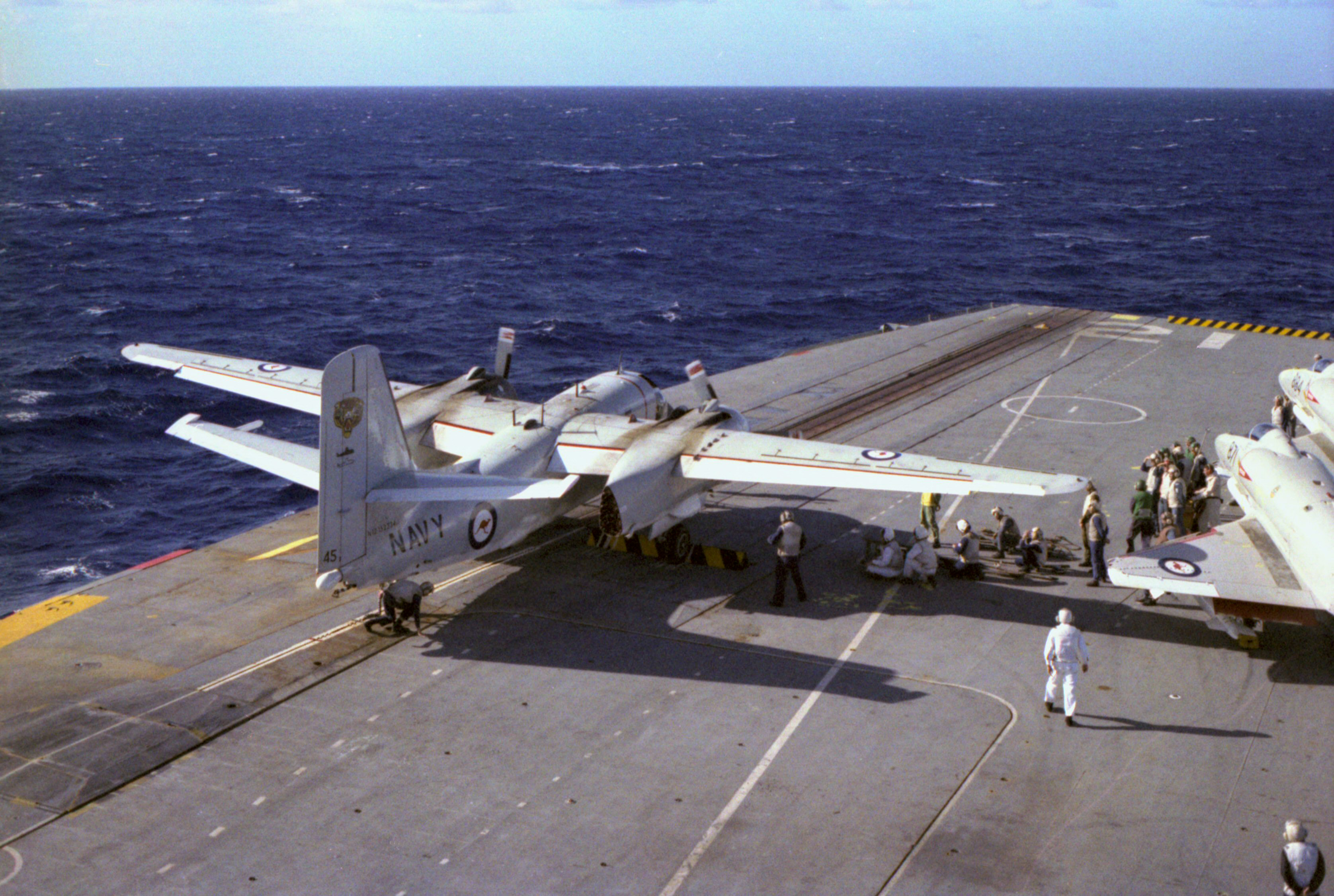
Australian Tracker 845 "in the chocks" prepares to launch from HMAS Melbourne, 1980

Between 1967 and 1984 the Royal Australian Navy operated two Squadrons of S-2E and S-2G variants, based at NAS Nowra (HMAS Albatross). These aircraft served with the RAN's 816 Squadron, which embarked aboard the Majestic-class aircraft carrier HMAS Melbourne as part of the 21st Carrier Air Group whenever that ship was deployed; and with 851 Squadron, the S-2 training squadron.

Australia initially acquired 14 S-2Es. During approximately 17 years of operation of the Tracker, the RAN lost only one S-2 during aircraft operations due to an accident at sea on 10 February 1975. However, on 4 December 1976, a deliberately lit fire in a hangar at Nowra destroyed or badly damaged a large proportion of the RAN's complement of Trackers. Of the 14 original aircraft, one was away from Nowra undergoing maintenance at the time of the fire and three aircraft were damaged but only two of these were repaired. The destroyed aircraft were subsequently replaced with 16 ex-USN aircraft. The replacement aircraft were all S-2Gs, including the original aircraft modified by the USN to that status. This saw the introduction of AQA-7 acoustic gear into RAN service and all RAN operational Trackers were subsequently modified to this standard.

=== Brazil ===
The Brazilian Air Force flew Trackers from the aircraft carrier NAeL Minas Gerais. Both the S-2A and S-2E were used (respectively as P-16A and P-16E). At the end of its service in Brazilian Air Force, one S-2T Turbo Tracker was evaluated as a possible upgrade, but due high costs the program was canceled. However, in 2010 the Brazilian Navy contracted Marsh Aviation to convert four S-2Ts to Airborne Early Warning configuration and upgrade four additional Grumman C-1 Traders for tanking and carrier onboard delivery transport duties. The latter were scheduled to be back in service by 2015 and were expected to operate from the successor of Minas Gerais, NAe São Paulo. Following the bankruptcy of Marsh Aviation in 2009 the program suffered delays and the upgrade of the airframes was resumed in partnership with Elbit Systems's subsidiary, M7 Aerospace. The decommissioning of the São Paulo in 2017 means that the Brazilian Navy does not have an immediate need for carrier-based tankers, transports and AEW aircraft, however the navy proceeded with procurement and the delivery of four tanker aircraft are expected by 2021.

As noted under Argentina above, Trackers of that country have been flown from the São Paulo until its decommissioning in early 2017.

=== Canada ===
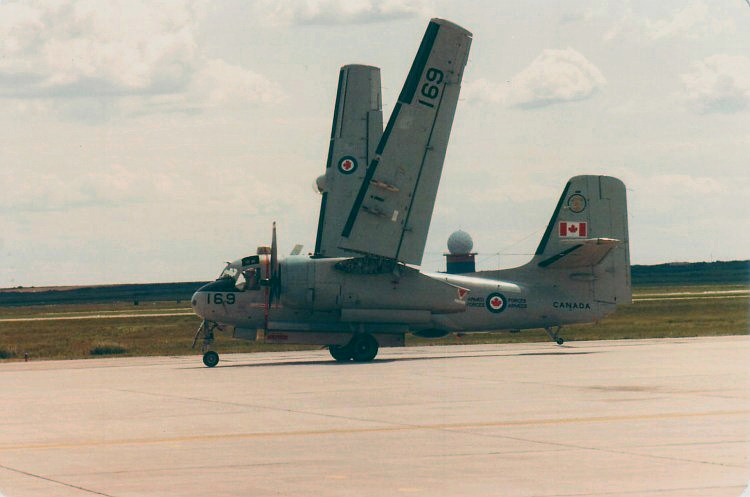
Canadian Forces CP-121 Tracker from VU-33 folds its wings while taxiing at CFB Moose Jaw in 1982

In 1954, de Havilland Canada (DHC) entered into a contract to build 100 Trackers under license to replace the outmoded Grumman TBM-3E Avengers being used by the Royal Canadian Navy (RCN). 99 Trackers were actually built by DHC, with the first Canadian-built aircraft flying on 31 May 1956. From 1957 onwards, these aircraft operated from the newly deployed aircraft carrier HMCS Bonaventure and various shore bases. All the Canadian Trackers were built to the earlier "A" model airframe design with a length of 42 feet (13 m) (cf. 43 ft 6 in (13.26 m) for later model Trackers) in order to fit in Bonaventure's hangar. In 1960–1961, 17 CS2F-1 aircraft, which had been relegated to training and utility duties by the CS2F-2, were transferred to the Royal Netherlands Navy. From 1964, 45 CS2F-2s were upgraded by fitting revised electronic equipment and sensors, becoming CS2F-3s. Also in 1964, a pair of CS2F-1 aircraft were stripped of armament and ASW electronics, converted to transports, and subsequently used for carrier onboard delivery. The CS2F-1, -2, and -3 were redesignated as the CP-121 Mk.1, Mk. 2, and Mk. 3 respectively following the unification of Canadian forces in 1968.

After Bonaventure was decommissioned in 1970, all remaining Canadian Trackers were transferred to shore bases. This limited their usefulness for ASW patrols, and between 1974 and 1981 gradually all but 20 were placed in storage and the remainder were stripped of their ASW gear. The remaining active-duty Trackers served until 1990 on fisheries protection and maritime patrol duties. A handful of Trackers were kept in flying condition until the late 1990s but were no longer used for active service.

DHC purchased a single U.S.-built S2F-1 from Grumman for testing avionics and anti-submarine systems and also for evaluating Engineering Change Proposals created by Grumman; it was initially given RCN serial number 1500 and counted as one of the 100 contracted airframes. In 1954, this aircraft was transferred to the RCN for operational testing, and assigned the test code X-500. In 1956, it was upgraded to CS2F-1 standards and assigned serial number 1501; it was last used as a stationary instructional airframe at Shearwater until 1972. It is not known whether this aircraft was ever assigned a U.S. Navy bureau number.

=== Japan ===
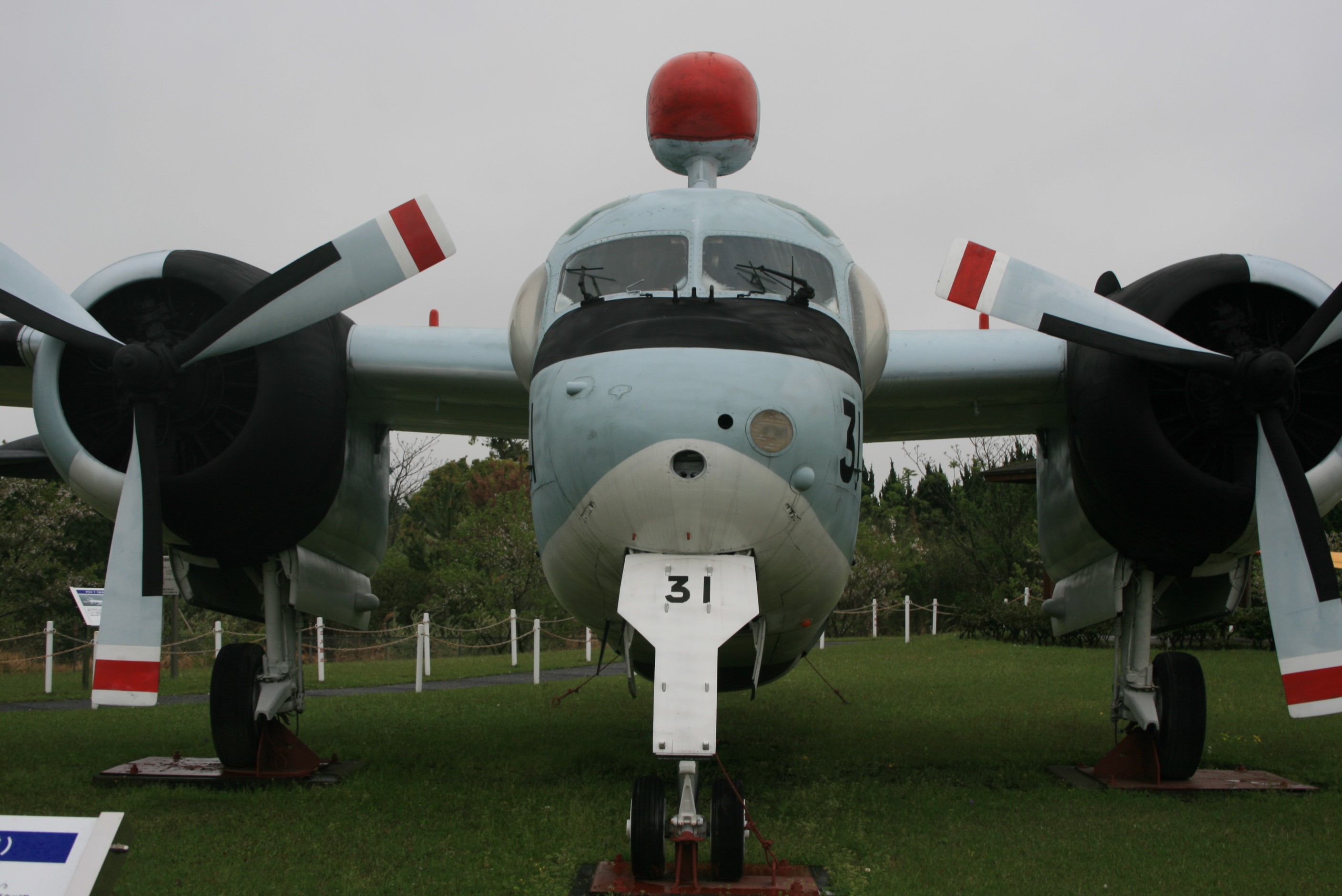
Japan Maritime Self-Defense Force S2F-1 at Kanoya Air Base

The Japan Maritime Self-Defense Force received 60 S2F-1s in 1957 from U.S. stocks, and they were operated until 1984. After being received, six S2F-1s were reconfigured into four S2F-U and two S2F-C variants. The S2F-1 was nicknamed Aotaka (あおたか, Blue Hawk). They were replaced by the Lockheed P-3 Orion.

=== Netherlands ===
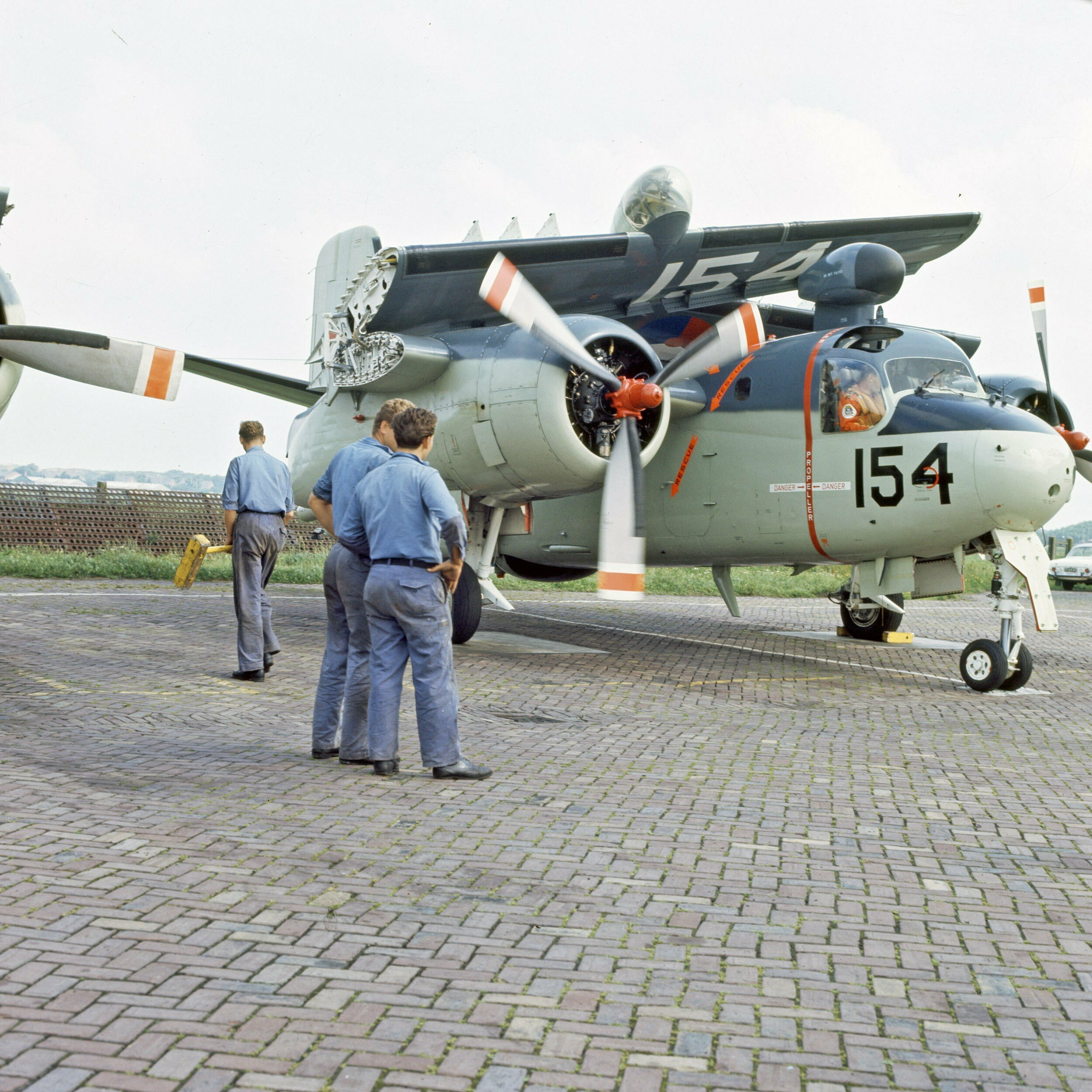
Dutch Grumman S2F-1 (S-2A) Tracker with wings folded.

The Netherlands Naval Aviation Service (Marineluchtvaartdienst - MLD), the air arm of the Royal Netherlands Navy, received 28 S-2A (S2F-1) aircraft under MDAP from the US Navy in 1960. An additional 17 Canadian-built CS-2A (CS2F-1) aircraft formerly operated by the Royal Canadian Navy were delivered between December 1960 and September 1961 after being overhauled by Fairey Canada. These aircraft were operated from Valkenburg Naval Air Base as well as from the light aircraft carrier Karel Doorman until a fire in 1968 took that ship out of Dutch service.

A total of 18 aircraft were converted to S-2N (for Netherlands) standard by Fairey Canada in 1968–1970 for ASW and MR use with 1 Sqn (at Hato International Airport), of which four were converted to US-2N trainer/transport standards in May 1971. Most of the de Havilland Canada-built CS-2As were scrapped by 1970 or used for ground instruction. The last Tracker in MLD service was withdrawn in January 1976, with some transferred to the Turkish Navy.

=== Peru ===
Peruvian Navy S-2E Trackers

The Peruvian Navy operated with S-2E and S-2G from 1975 until 1989, they were assigned to Naval Aviation Squadron N°12 (Escuadron Aeronaval N°12). A total of 12 S-2Es were bought from the U.S. Navy in 1975 and 4 S-2G in 1983.

=== Taiwan ===
The Republic of China Air Force initially operated the S-2A in 1967. In 1976, they received S-2Es. The S-2As were later converted into target aircraft and later decommissioned in batches from 1979 to 1992. In 1986, several S-2Gs were purchased to make up for attrition. A modernization program began the same year, converting the remaining S-2E/G to a military S-2T configuration. The conversion involved the installation of two Garrett/Honeywell TPE-331-15AW turboprop engines, each rated at 1,227 kW (1,645 shp), with four-blade propellers This resulted in a payload increase of 500 kg. The upgrade also included new mission equipment of AN/AQS-92F digital sonobuoy processor, A/NARR-84 99-channel sonobuoy receiver, Litton AN/APS-504 radar, AN/ASQ-504 MAD and AN/AAS-40 FLIR.

The 27 S-2Ts upgraded were transferred to the ROCN Aviation Command on 1 July 1999. In 2013, the S-2s were transferred back into ROCAF service. In May 2017, all S-2Ts were withdrawn from active service.

=== Turkey ===
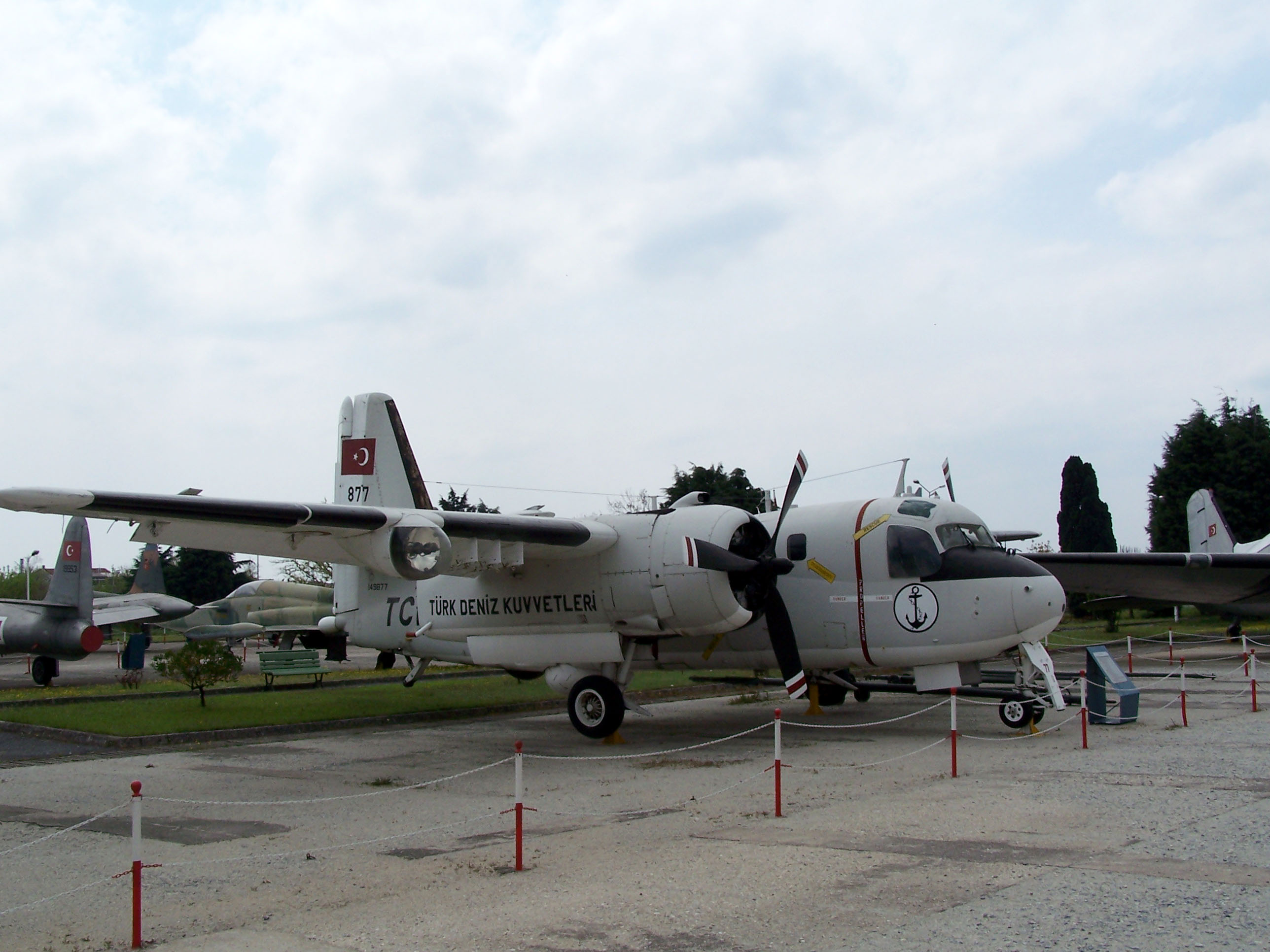
S-2E Tracker in the Istanbul Aviation Museum

The Turkish Navy received a number of ex-U.S. Navy S-2E Trackers under the MAP program and operated them from the Cengiz Topel Naval Air Base starting in the 1960s. These were later supplemented by retired S-2A (or S-2N as called by the Dutch) airframes from Netherlands. Turkish Trackers were retired in 1994 after a series of accidents caused by the advanced age and fatigue of the airframes.

=== Uruguay ===
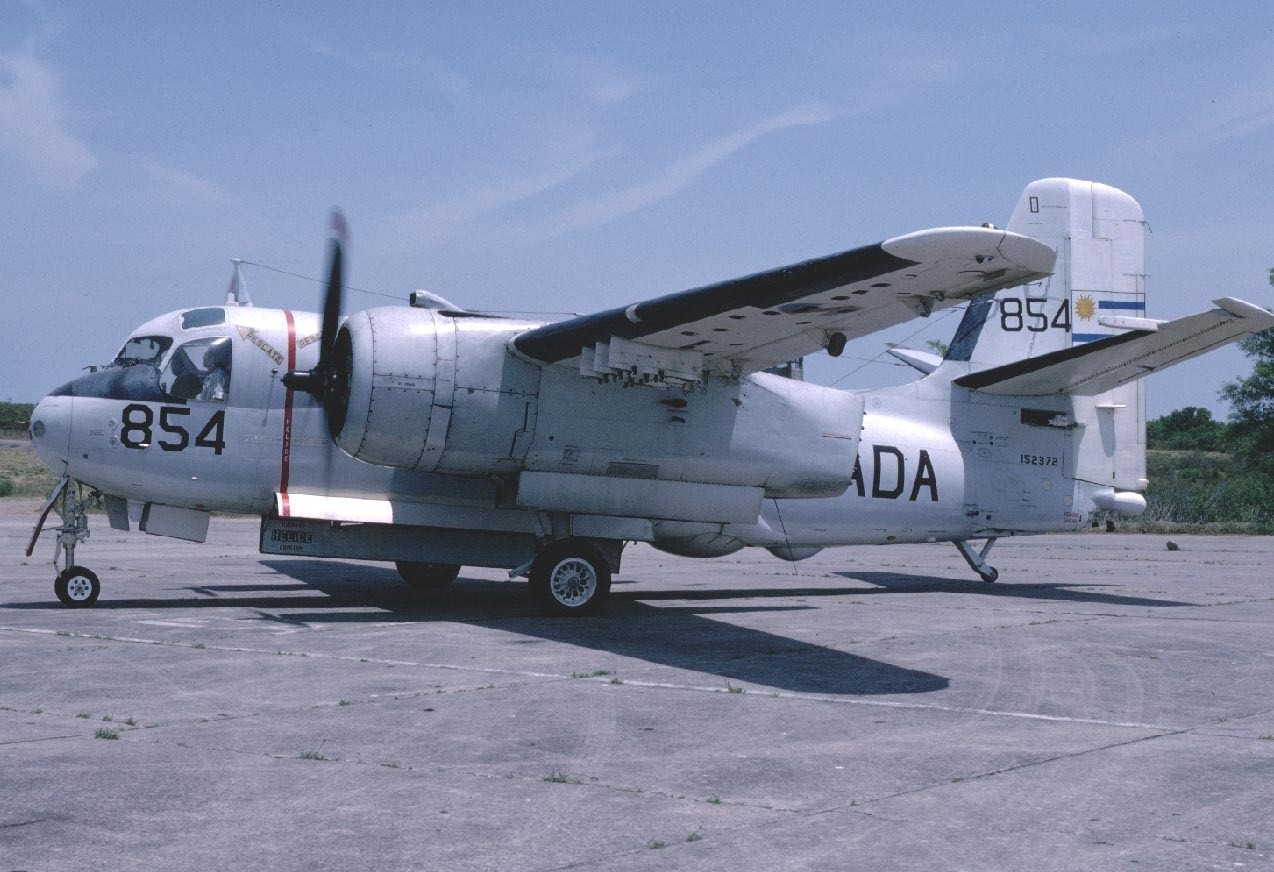
Uruguayan Naval Aviation Grumman S-2G Tracker (G-121)

The Uruguayan Navy received the first three S-2A Trackers on 10 April 1965 at the Capitan Curbelo Navy Base. On 15 September 1982, one S-2G arrived. On 2 February 1983, another two S-2Gs arrived. By September 2004, the remaining Uruguayan Trackers were not in flight condition.

=== Civilian use ===
From the late 1970s until the mid-1990s Conair Aviation of Abbotsford, British Columbia, Canada took possession of retired Canadian and U.S. Trackers and converted them into Firecats, with a four-door fire retardant tank replacing the weapons bay and adjacent mid-fuselage section. Firecats were made in two variants: the piston-engined Firecat and the turboprop-powered Turbo Firecat.

In 1958, CAL FIRE, then CDF, contracted with a private air tanker service for the use of their converted World War II aircraft. By 1970 the department began to evaluate the use of former military Grumman S-2 aircraft. Over the next ten years CAL FIRE continued to build up its fleet of S-2A air tankers and in 1987, CAL FIRE began the process of converting their piston engines to turboprop. By 2005 all of CAL FIRE's airtanker fleet had been converted to S-2T air tankers.

==== Turkey ====
The Tracker was considered for Turkey's firefighting aircraft project. The project, which began in the late 1990s, never went beyond the conversion of a single prototype. The Turkish Navy had retired its entire Tracker fleet 1994, so these aircraft were readily available for modification. Turkish Aerospace Industries (TAI) undertook a study in 1997 to investigate if it was possible to convert any of these S-2Es for firefighting. After re-engining with Honeywell TPE331 turboprop engines, at a cost of about $3 million per aircraft, it was expected to provide at least twenty years of service.

TAI ordered an S-2T Turbo Tracker upgrade kit for conversion of one of the S-2Es. Following its conversion in 1999, the aircraft was used during the 1999 Antalya wildfires and the Tüpraş Izmit Oil Refinery fire, started after the 1999 İzmit earthquake. Although up to fifteen aircraft were intended to be converted, the project was cancelled in 2002 for unclear reasons. TAI's Flight Test Engineering Group flew the lone converted aircraft as a testbed for new technology until the mid-2010s.

== Variants ==
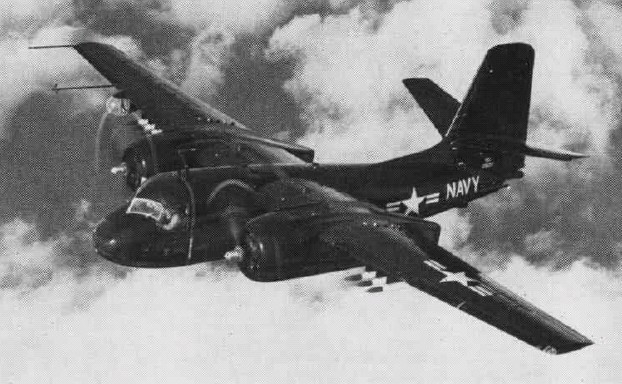
An early S2F-1 in 1954

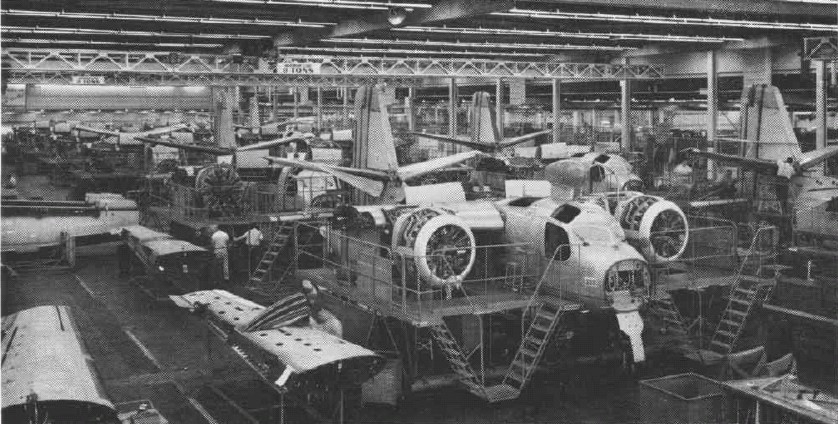
S2F production line in 1956

XS2F-1
Two prototype anti-submarine warfare aircraft powered by 1,450 hp R-1820-76WA engines.
YS2F-1
Designation of the first 15 production aircraft used for development, redesignated YS-2A in 1962.
S2F-1
Initial production variant with two 1,525 hp R-1820-82WA engines, re-designated S-2A in 1962, 740 built.
S2F-1T
Trainer conversion of S2F-1, redesignated TS-2A in 1962.
S2F-1U
Utility conversion of S2F-1, redesignated US-2A in 1962.
S2F-1S
S2F-1 conversion with Julie/Jezebel detection equipment, redesignated S-2B in 1962. Survivors converted to US-2B after removal of ASW gear.
S2F-1S1
S2F-1S fitted with updated Julie/Jezebel equipment, redesignated S-2F in 1962.
S2F-2
As S2F-1 with asymmetrical (port-side) extension of bomb bay, slightly enlarged tail surfaces, 77 built, most redesignated S-2C in 1962.
S2F-2P
Photo reconnaissance conversion of S2F-2, redesignated RS-2C in 1962.
S2F-2U
Utility conversion of S2F-2/S-2C, redesignated US-2C in 1962. Some were used as target tugs.
S2F-3
Enlarged forward fuselage, enlarged tail surfaces, additional fuel capacity, and enlarged engine nacelles bays for 32 sonobuoys, redesignated S-2D in 1962, 100 built.
S2F-3S
As S2F-3 but with Julie/Jezebel equipment, redesignated S-2E in 1962, 252 built.
YS-2A
YS2F-1 redesignated in 1962.
S-2A
S2F-1 redesignated in 1962.
TS-2A
S2F-1T training version redesignated in 1962 and 207 conversion from S-2A.
US-2A
S-2A converted as light transports/target tugs, 51 conversions.
S-2B
S2F-1S redesignated in 1962.
US-2B
Utility and target tug conversions of S-2A and S-2B; most S-2Bs were converted and 66 S-2As.
S-2C
S2F-2 redesignated in 1962.
RS-2C
S2F-2P photo-reconnaissance version redesignated in 1962.
US-2C
S2F-2U utility version redesignated in 1962.

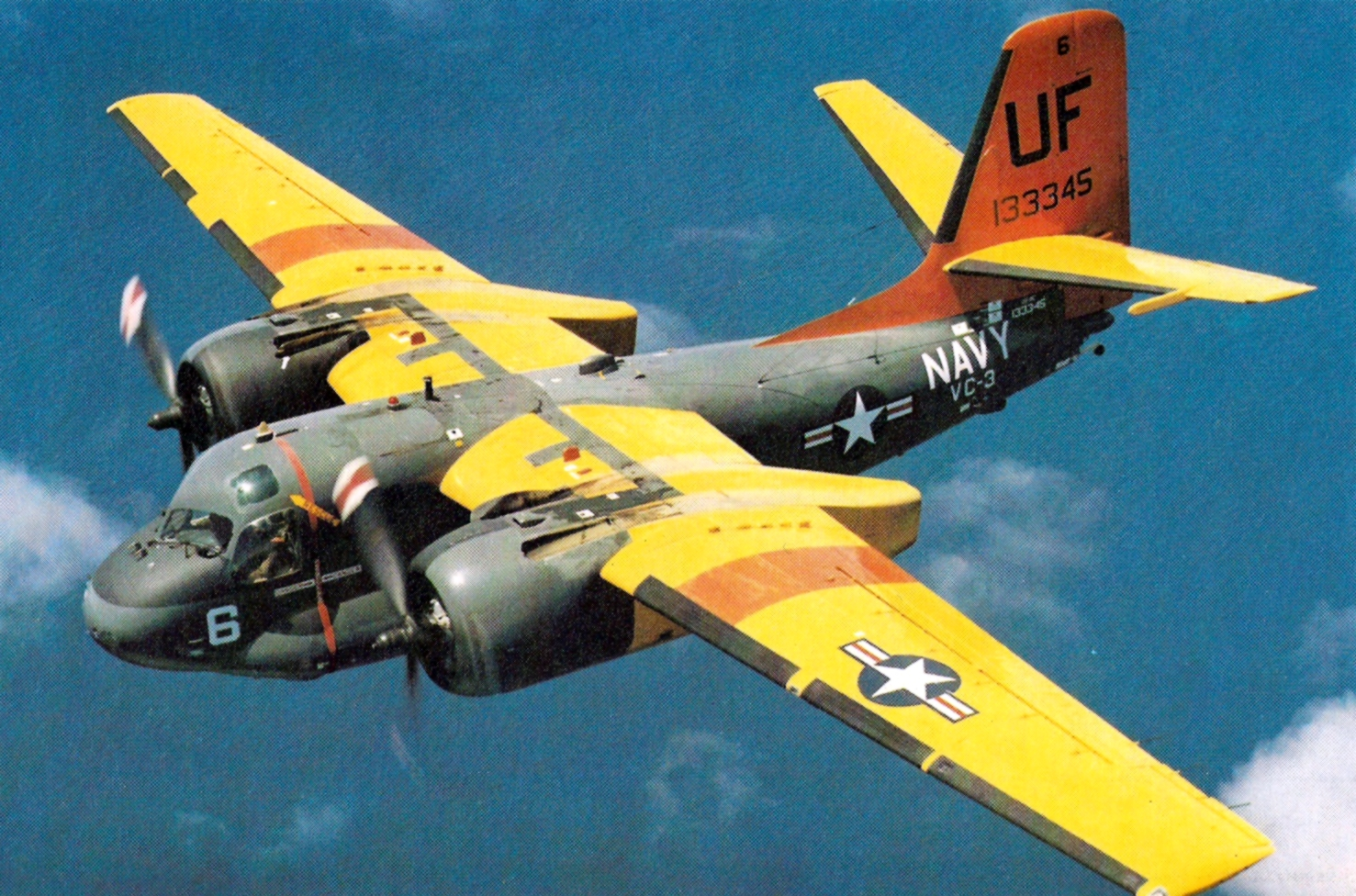
A US-2C of VC-3.

S-2D
S2F-3 redesignated in 1962.
YAS-2D/AS-2D
Proposed self-contained night attack aircraft to be developed under Operation Shed Light; none produced.
ES-2D
Electronic trainer conversion of the S-2D.
US-2S
Utility conversion of the S-2D.
S-2E
S2F-3S redesignated in 1962.
S-2F
S2F-1S1 redesignated in 1962.
US-2F
Transport conversion of S-2F.

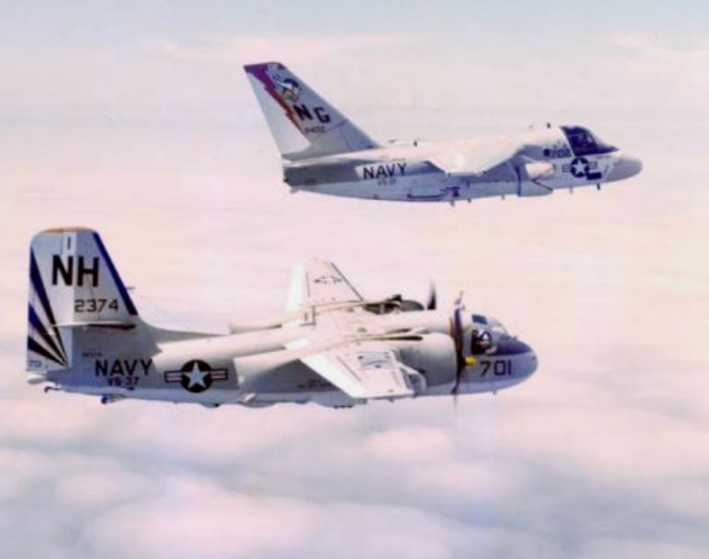
The final S-2G with its S-3A replacement in 1976

S-2G
S-2E conversions with updated electronics (primarily AN/AQA-7 DIFAR sonobuoy processor and AN/ARR-75 sonobuoy receiver)
CS2F-1
Initial production run of anti-submarine warfare aircraft for Canada based on S2F-1. A total of 42 built by De Havilland Canada.
CS2F-2
Improved version of CS2F-1 with Litton Industries tactical navigation equipment. A total of 57 were built by De Havilland Canada.
CS2F-3
New designation given to 43 CS2F-2 aircraft upgraded with additional electronics.
CP-121
New designation given to all CS2F-1, -2, and -3 aircraft following unification of Canadian military in 1968.
P-16A
Brazilian Air Force designation of the S-2A.
P-16E
Brazilian Air Force designation of the S-2E.
UP-16
Brazilian Air Force designation for a utility variant of the S-2.

=== Turbo Tracker ===
Military S-2T Turbo Tracker For Argentina
Upgraded S-2E with new engines and military equipment by IAI in the 1990s for the Argentine Navy. 6 upgraded.
Military S-2T Turbo Tracker For Taiwan
Upgraded S-2E/S-2G with new engines and military equipment by Grumman from 1986 to 1992 for the ROC Air Force. 27 upgraded.
S-2T Turbo Tracker
Civil conversion
S-2AT
Civil firefighter conversion with turboprop engines.
S-2ET

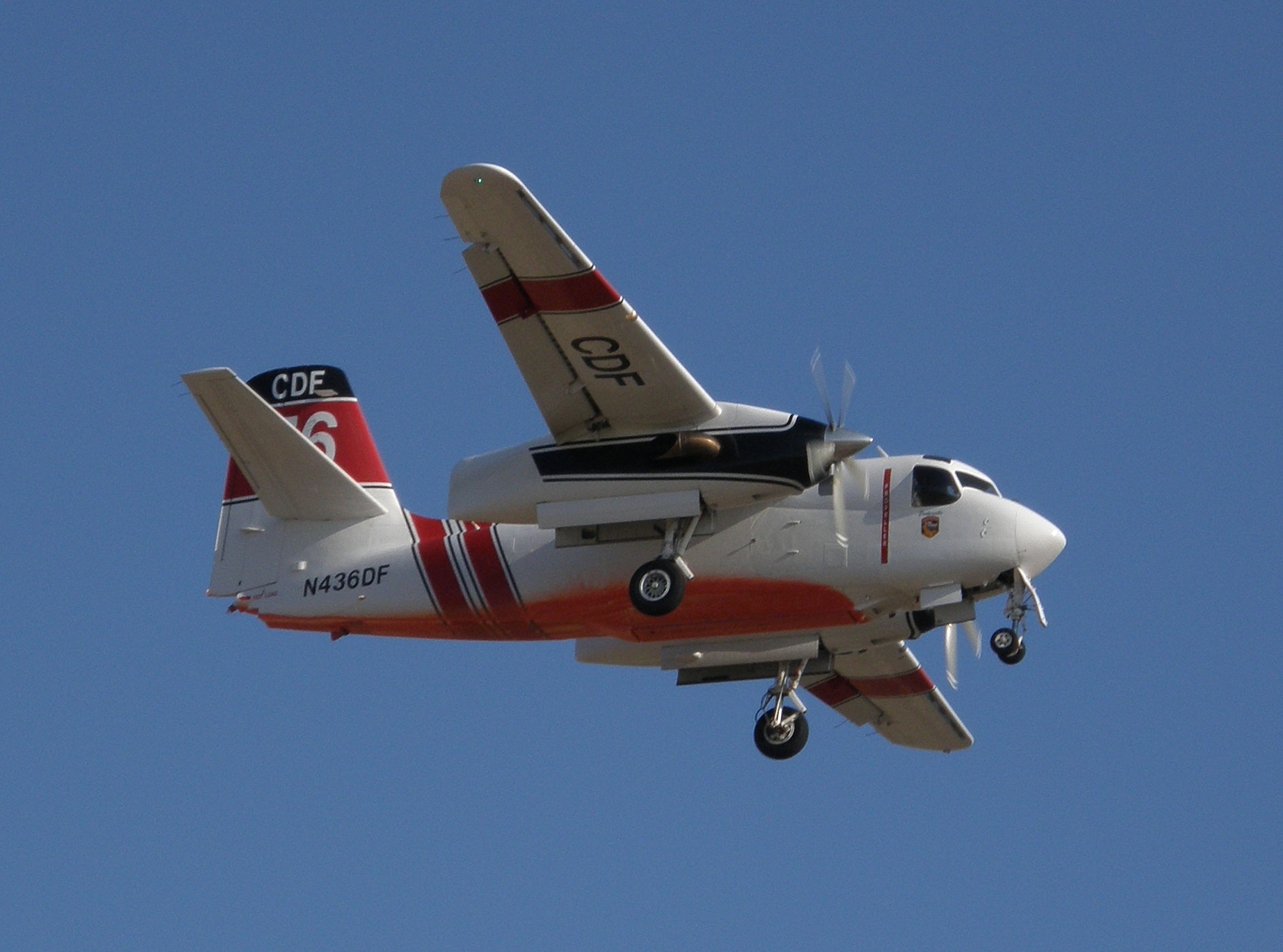
CDF S-2F3AT TurboTracker landing at Fox Field, Lancaster, California, while fighting the 2007 North Fire

Civil conversion
Marsh Aviation S-2F3AT Turbo Tracker
Turboprop conversion, powered by two Garrett TPE331 engines; A total of 22 are operated by the CDF.
Conair Firecat or Turbo Firecat
Civil conversion as a single-seat firefighting aircraft.
P-16H
Brazilian Air Force designation of the Turbo Tracker.

=== Derivatives ===
- For the crew trainer/transport version based on the Tracker refer to Grumman C-1 Trader
- For the Airborne Early Warning version based on the Trader refer to Grumman E-1 Tracer

== Operators ==
=== Military operators ===
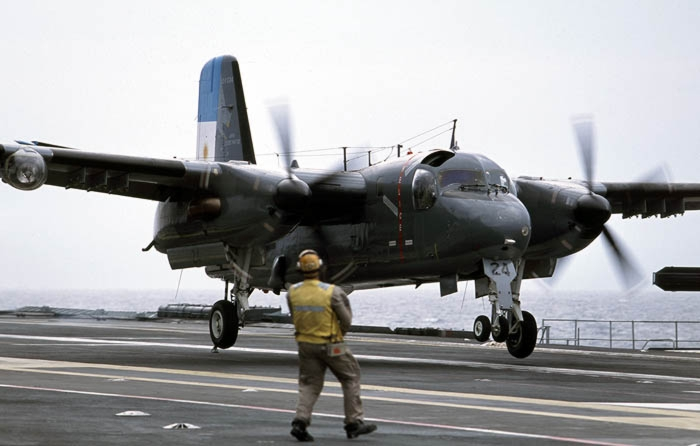
Argentine S2T Tracker operating from the Brazilian aircraft carrier São Paulo

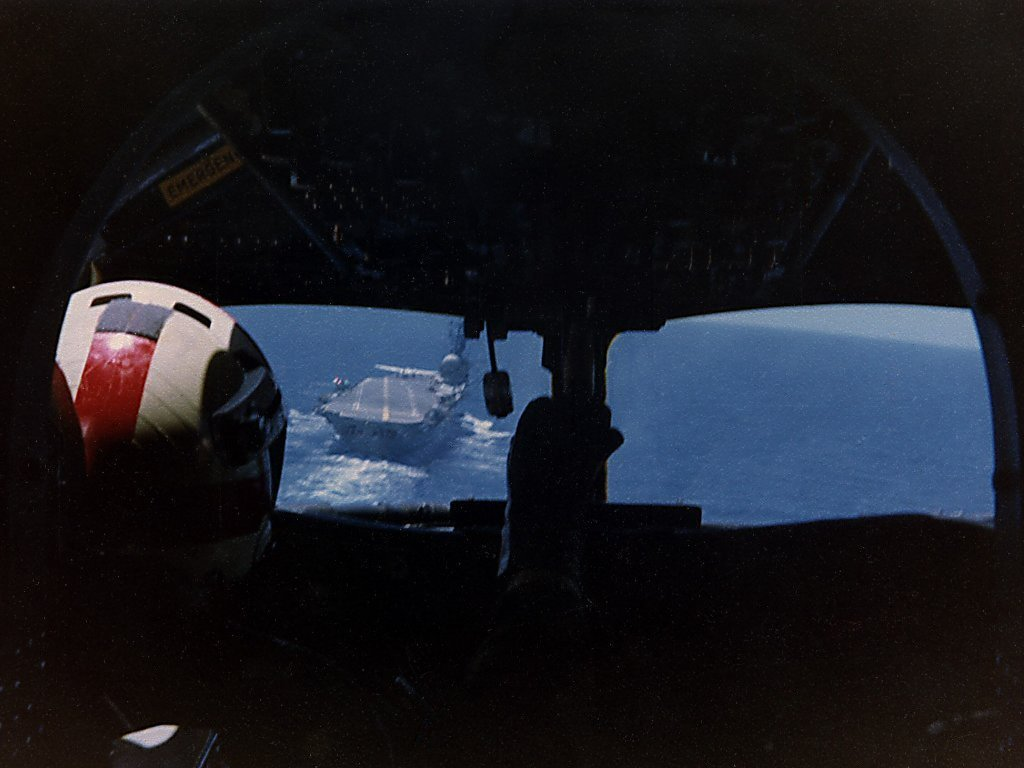
View from an Australian Tracker on final approach to aircraft carrier HMAS Melbourne

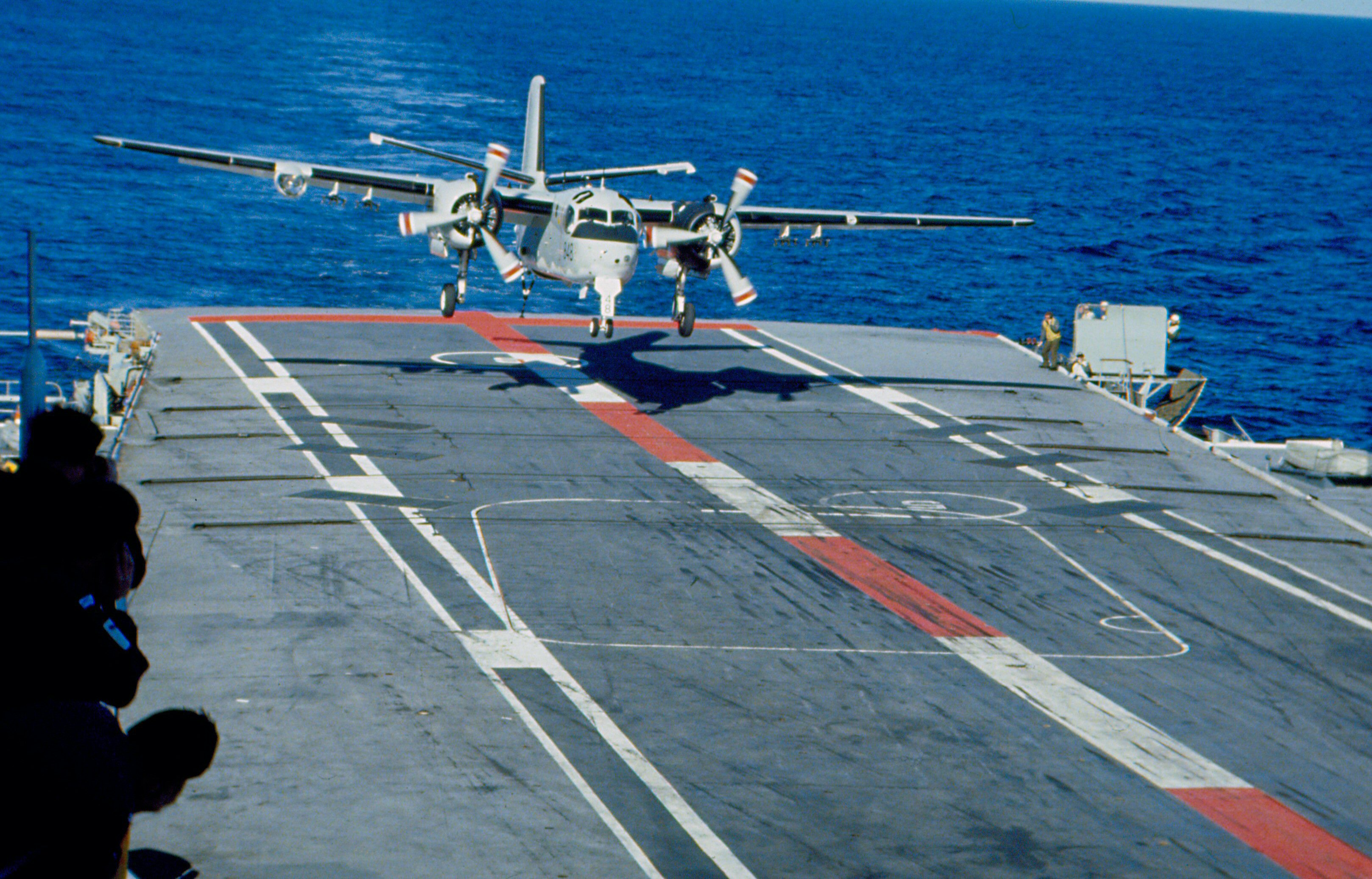
Tracker 848 about to take the wire aboard HMAS Melbourne, 1980

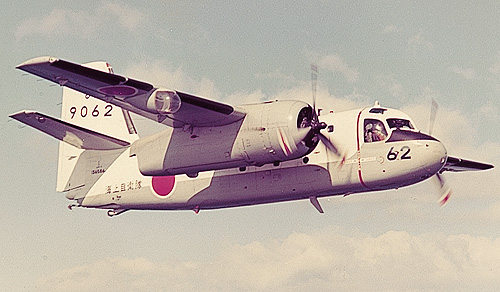
Japan Maritime Self-Defense Force S2F-C

Argentina (retired)

- Argentine Naval Aviation 15 ex-USN trackers

Australia (retired)

- Royal Australian Navy

Brazil (retired)

- Brazilian Air Force

Canada (retired)

- Royal Canadian Navy 99 - 42 CSF-1 and 57 CSF-2 (43 converted as CSF-3) (1956–1968) transferred to CF during unification as CP-121
  - VS-880
  - VU-32 Utility Squadron
- Canadian Forces 99 CP-121 (1968–1990)

Italy (retired)

- Italian Air Force operated 45 Grumman S2F-1 Tracker delivered in 1957 and retired in 1978

Japan (retired)

- Japan Maritime Self-Defense Force
  - Air Transport Squadron 61

Netherlands (retired)

- Royal Netherlands Navy

Peru (retired)

- Peruvian Navy

South Korea (retired)

- Republic of Korea Navy

Taiwan (Republic of China) (retired)

- Republic of China Air Force operated S-2A/E/G from 1967 to 1992, S-2T from 1992 to 2017, replaced by 12 rebuilt U.S. Navy P-3C Orions.

Thailand (retired)

- Royal Thai Navy

Turkey (retired)

- Turkish Navy Aerial Wing

United States (retired)

- United States Navy operated Trackers between 1954 and 1976.
- United States Marine Corps operated some Trackers.

Uruguay (retired)

- Uruguayan Navy

Venezuela (retired)

- Venezuelan Navy

=== Civil operators ===
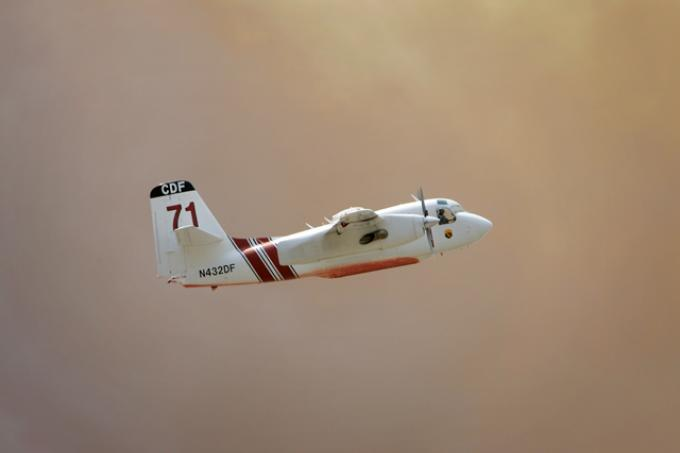
California Department of Forestry and Fire Protection S-2T conducting firefighting air drops on the Sawtooth Complex fire, 2006

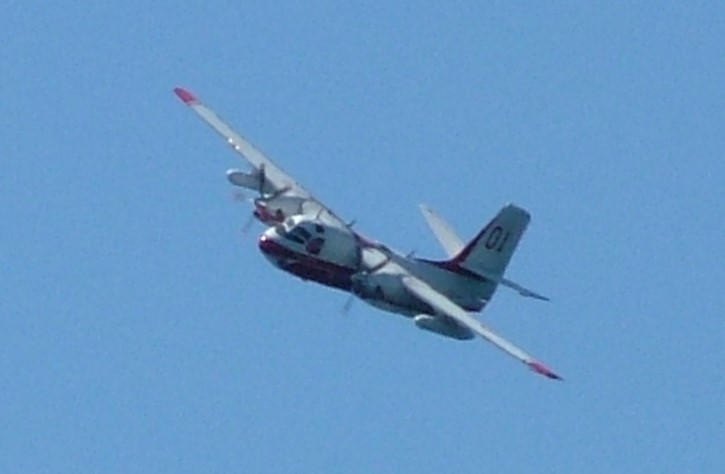
French Sécurité Civile S-2FT Tracker used for fire-fighting duties

Many retired Trackers were sold to private owners for fire-fighting duties. Some were rebuilt and re-engined with turboprop engines.

Canada

- Conair Group Inc. acquired a total of 82 CS2F and S2F Trackers, converting 32 airframes to Firecats and 13 - including 9 previously-converted Firecats - to Turbo Firecats.
- Saskatchewan Ministry of Environment operated 6 CS2F Field Aviation conversions and 1 replacement Conair Firecat.
- Ontario Ministry of Natural Resources operated 6 CS2F Field Aviation conversions; later sold to Conair

France

- Sécurité Civile received Conair Firecats and Turbo Firecats.

Netherlands

- KLM used ex-Dutch Navy Tracker to train its mechanics.

United States

- California Department of Forestry & Fire Protection (CAL FIRE) operates S-2F3AT Turbo Tracker (G-121) aircraft as aerial firefighting air tankers.
- Hemet Valley Flying Service received TS-2A(FF) Tracker (G-89)
- Marsh Aviation received S-2A(FF) Tracker (G-89)
- Sis-Q Flying Service received TS-2A Tracker (G-89/S2F-1T)
- Aero Union, in addition to being an operator, Aero Union developed the prototype S-2 tankers for the State of California in 1973.

== Aircraft on display ==
Although still in active service in South America, numbers of Trackers are on public display, mainly in countries that formerly operated the type.

== Specifications (S-2F) ==
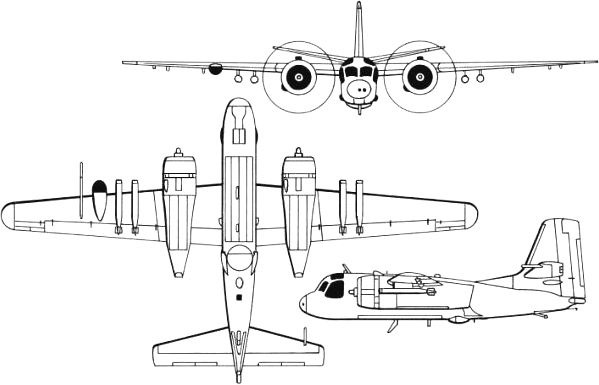

Data from Canada Aviation and Space Museum

General characteristics

- Crew: 4
- Length: 43 ft 6 in (13.26 m)
- Wingspan: 72 ft 7 in (22.12 m)
- Height: 17 ft 6 in (5.33 m)
- Wing area: 485 sq ft (45.1 m^{2})
- Empty weight: 18,315 lb (8,308 kg)
- Gross weight: 23,435 lb (10,630 kg)
- Max takeoff weight: 26,147 lb (11,860 kg)
- Powerplant: 2 × Wright R-1820-82WA 9-cylinder air-cooled radial piston engines, 1,525 hp (1,137 kW) each

Performance

- Maximum speed: 243 kn (280 mph, 450 km/h) at sea level
- Cruise speed: 130 kn (150 mph, 240 km/h)
- Range: 1,173 nmi (1,350 mi, 2,172 km)
- Endurance: 9 hours endurance
- Service ceiling: 22,000 ft (6,700 m)
- Wing loading: 48.3 lb/sq ft (236 kg/m^{2})

Armament

- 4,800 lb (2,200 kg) of payload could be carried in the internal bomb bay and on 6 under-wing hardpoints
  - Torpedoes: Mk. 41, Mk. 43, Mk. 34, Mk. 44 or Mk. 46
  - Depth charges: Mk. 54 or naval mines

== See also ==
Related development

- Grumman C-1 Trader
- Grumman E-1 Tracer

Aircraft of comparable role, configuration, and era

- Grumman AF Guardian
- Fairey Gannet
- Bréguet 1050 Alizé
- Lockheed S-3 Viking
