= Conair Group =

Canadian based firefighting airline

Conair Aerial Firefighting.

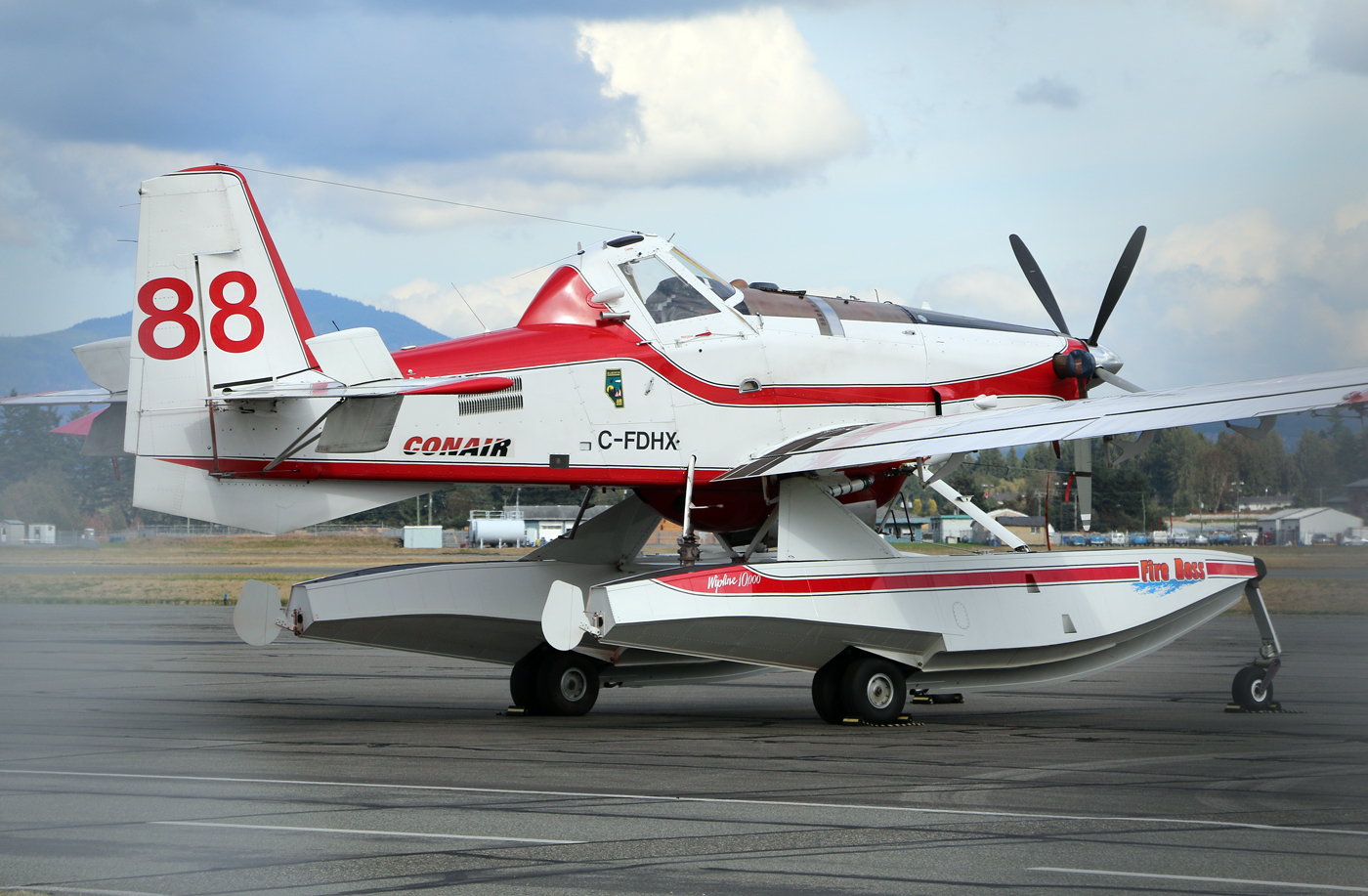
- An Air Tractor AT-802
IATA	ICAO	Call sign
N/A	FGD	FIREGUARD
- Founded: April 1969
- AOC #: Canada:2626
- Hubs: Abbotsford International Airport
- Fleet size: 74
- Parent company: Conair Group Inc.
- Headquarters: Abbotsford, British Columbia, Canada
- Key people: Chris Niemann (president & CEO)
- Website: www.conair.ca

Conair Group Inc. of Abbotsford, British Columbia, Canada, formerly known as Conair Aviation, is a company specializing in retrofitting firefighting aircraft, maintaining customer and company-owned aircraft and aerial firefighting. Conair currently employs over 250 staff and has a fleet of aircraft that are broken down into two categories; air attack (a.k.a. bird dog), and airtankers (a.k.a. waterbombers). Conair specializes in fire management support by providing services and products to forest protection agencies around the world. In 1996 Conair became a Canadian Air Tractor dealer for the AT-802F air tanker. A former Conair Group division; Cascade Aerospace was acquired by the IMP Group of Halifax, Nova Scotia in 2012.

== History ==
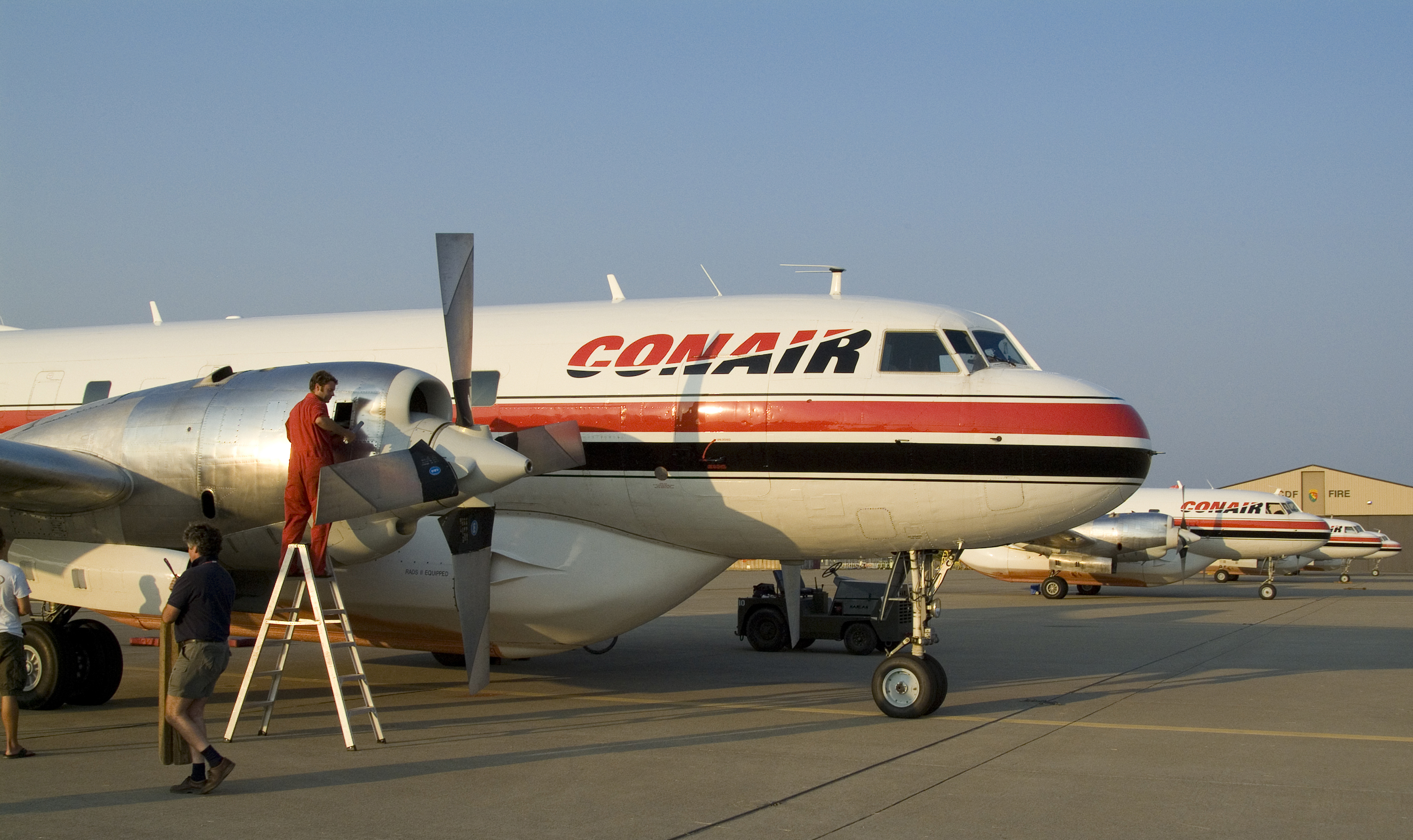
Convair CV580 Airtanker

The company was started by a consortium led by Les Kerr consisting of: Leslie George "Les" Kerr, K. Barry Marsden, Herman Joseph "Slim" Knights, Ronald "Ron" F. Connelly of Whitehorse, Yukon, and John De Voin (a silent partner). Les Kerr had worked for Skyway Air Services for seventeen years and put together the five man group to take control of the fire control and aerial agricultural interests of Skyway. In the transaction, they took 35 employees and 19 single engine aircraft. This took place after the owner for Skyway (Art Seller), had suffered a stroke and wanted to eliminate some of his workload.

Skyway Air Services was started shortly after the close of WW2. They were pioneers in the development and operation of aerial firefighting, agricultural and pest control spraying. After the interests were sold, Skyway continued to operate as a flying school and charter business out of Langley, British Columbia.

In 1978 Conair acquired a subsidiary; Frontier Helicopters based at Watson Lake, Yukon. This rotary division was renamed Conair Helicopters in 1999. Conair also went into the Air Cargo business in 1980 by starting a company named Swiftair Cargo. They filed for license in early July 1979, and flew for the first time on September 15, 1980, using two Douglas DC-8 aircraft flying in opposite directions across Canada. Swiftair Cargo went into receivership by May 1982.

By 1984 Conair had the world's largest private fleet of Air Tankers including 50 fixed wing aircraft and 15 helicopters and by the early 1990s has grown to over 90 aircraft. Conair Aviation Ltd. later became Conair Group Inc., and they continue to be based out of Abbotsford, British Columbia.

== Fleet ==
As of May 2025, according to Transport Canada (TC), the Conair Group fleet numbers 74 aircraft.

Conair Group fleet
Aircraft	Number	Variants	Notes
Aero Commander 690	9	1 - Commander 690; 6 - Commander 690A; 2 - Commander 690B	Air attack or bird dog, listed at Conair as Turbo Commander TC-690A and one listed by Transport Canada as a Rockwell 690A
Air Tractor AT-802	29	3 - AT-802; 26 - AT-802A	Air Tanker, nine of which have amphibious scooping capability. Listed at the Conair site as the Air Tractor AT802 Amphib, Air Tractor 802AF and F
Avro RJ85	4	Avro RJ85	Jet air tanker, listed at Conair as the Avro RJ85 AT
Cessna 185 Skywagon	1	A185F	
Cessna 208 Caravan	5	208B Grand Caravan	Air attack or bird dog, listed at Conair as Cessna Caravan C208B
Cessna Citation	1	Model 525B	Not listed at Conair website
De Havilland Canada Dash 8	22	DHC-8-402	Air tanker and multi-role
SOCATA TBM	3	TBM 700	Listed at Conair website as the TBM 960 and listed by TC as Compagnie Daher TBM 700
Total	74		

In addition Conair show at least one Canadair CL-215, operated by Aero-Flite, that has been retrofitted and converted into a CL-415EAF with turboprop engines.

The Dash 8 were originally two used Bombardier Dash 8 Q400s, acquired from Scandinavian Airlines System, that were modified by the Conair Group's former division Cascade Aerospace of Abbotsford, British Columbia. These aircraft are set up for dual roles and were modified for the Sécurité Civile to act both as fire-fighting water bombers in fire season and as civilian or cargo transport aircraft in the off season. This aircraft is designated the Q400-MR (Multi Role). The aircraft can be reconfigured into the passenger, cargo or aerial fire control role in under three hours and can drop 10,000 L (2,200 imp gal; 2,600 US gal)in the tanker role. In recent years 14 Dash 8 Q400’s were purchased from Flybe and also converted into tankers.

In January 2021, Conair announced that it had purchased 11 Q400s from defunct British airline Flybe for conversion into Q400AT and Q400MR configurations.

== Air attack ==
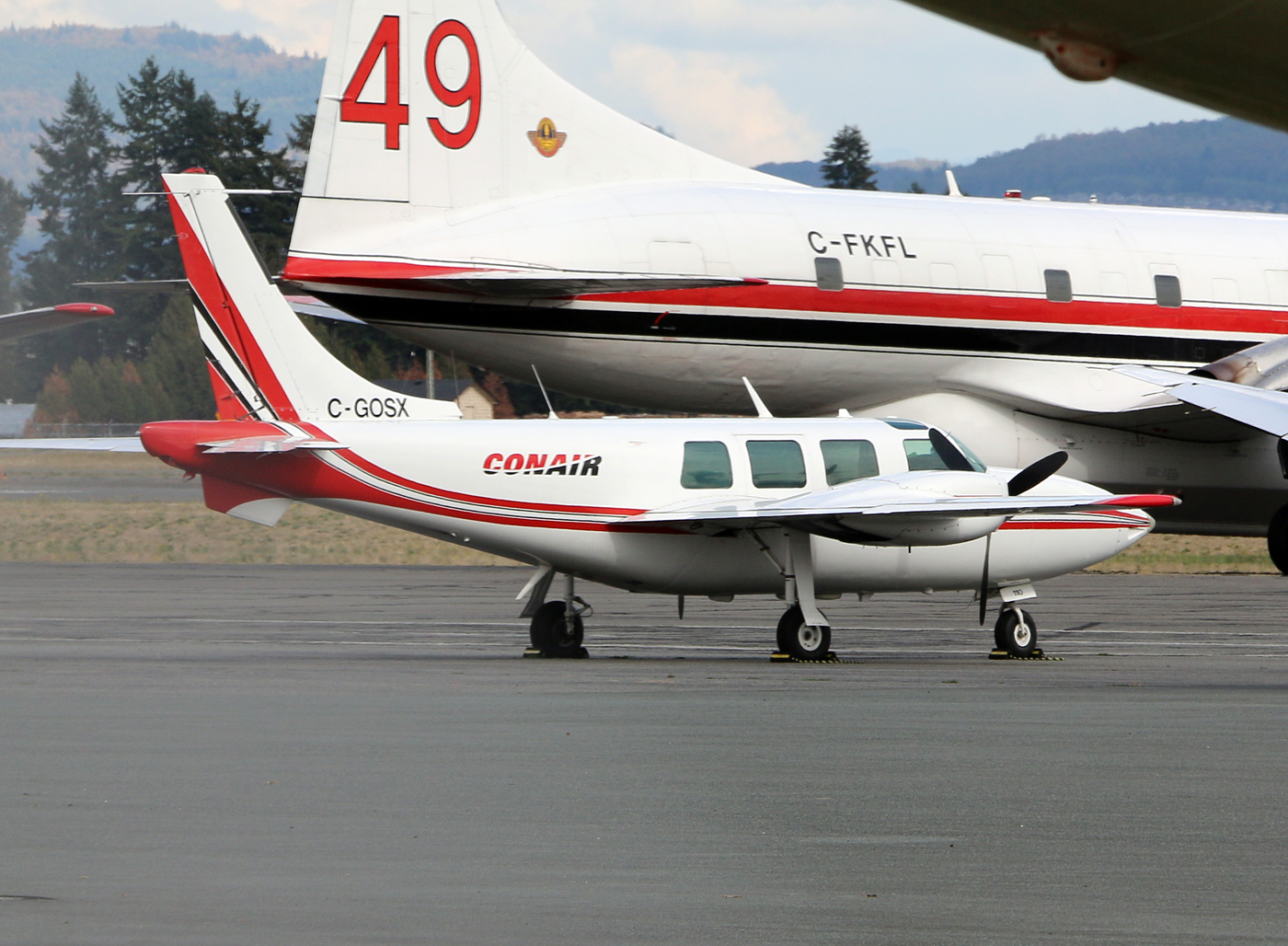
Piper Aerostar "bird dog" parked beside a Convair 580 air tanker

Conair's air attack aircraft, more commonly known as "bird dogs", are aircraft that contain the pilot and Air Attack Officer. The bird dogs ensure the runs to be made by the laden airtankers are safe and free of obstructions. The crew inside the bird dog determine the run locations and drop types to be made, coordinate the aerial action with the ground crews if present and control the airspace around the fire. These aircraft are always used in conjunction with the airtankers.

Former attack aircraft include the Cessna T210, Cessna Skymaster T337 including the piston 337, and Piper Aerostars, since superseded by eight Aero Commander 690 (listed by Conair as Turbo Commander TC-690A), five Cessna 208 Caravan (listed by Conair as the Cessna Caravan C208B), and a single Cessna 525B Citation jet (not listed at Conair's website).

== Air tankers ==
Conair's tanker fleet currently includes the Air Tractor AT-802 and Air Tractor AT802F Fire Boss, an amphibious variant, four Avro RJ85, seventeen De Havilland Canada Dash 8 (both the Bombardier Q400-AT and Q400MRE, and the Canadair CL-415 operated by subsidiary, Aero-Flite.

Conair's headquarters are in Abbotsford at the Abbotsford International Airport which also is where their maintenance and retrofitting facility is located. Conair bases their aircraft under contract to fire control agencies throughout western Canada and the United States. Currently, Conair airtanker groups (a group consists of one birddog and from one to four airtankers) are contracted to agencies in BC, Alberta, Yukon and Alaska. Conair serves as the Canadian dealer for Air Tractor of Olney, Texas, which produces the AT-802F, one of only two types of aircraft specifically designed for aerial firefighting (the other being the Canadair CL-415 model).

Former air tankers include the Grumman Avenger, Douglas (A-26) Invader, Conair Firecat (retrofitted S-2 Trackers), Douglas DC-6, Convair CV-580 (retired in 2022) and Lockheed Electra (retired in 2020).

== Accidents and incidents ==
- August 2, 1974 – Tanker 441, a Douglas DC-6B with registration CF-PWA, stalled and crashed while turning to avoid rising terrain whilst firefighting near Ashcroft, British Columbia, killing all three crew members on board.
- August 7, 1974 – Tanker 23, a Douglas A-26 Invader with registration CF-FBV, lost control and crashed into Mount Bowman, whilst firefighting near Clinton, British Columbia, killing the sole pilot on board.
- August 12, 1974 – Tanker 24, a Douglas A-26 Invader with registration CF-DFC, crashed into Stoyoma Mountain whilst on a ferrying flight in low visibility, killing the sole pilot on board.
- July 31, 2010 – Tanker 448, a Convair CV-580 with registration C-FKFY, collided with trees, entered a stall-spin, and crashed while fighting a wildfire near Lytton, British Columbia, killing both crew members on board.
- May 22, 2015 – Tanker 692, a float-equipped Air Tractor AT-802 with registration C-FDHV, encountered a fire whirl and crashed whilst firefighting near Cold Lake, Alberta, killing the pilot on board.
