= VT-28 =

Training Squadron Twenty Eight
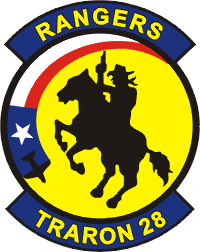
- VT-28 Logo
- Active: 1 May 1960 - present
- Country: United States of America
- Branch: United States Navy
- Type: Training
- Part of: Training Wing Four
- Garrison/HQ: NAS Corpus Christi
- Nickname(s): Rangers
- Motto(s): "The Foundation Builders"

Commanders
- Current commander: Commander Sean Dougherty

Aircraft flown
- Trainer: T-6B Texan II

The VT-28 "Rangers" is a U.S. Navy primary flight training squadron based at Naval Air Station Corpus Christi, Texas.

== History ==
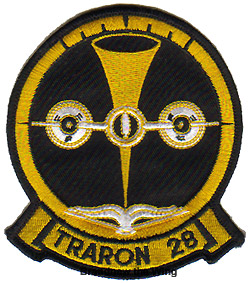
Patch of VT-28 as an Advanced Multi-engine Training Squadron

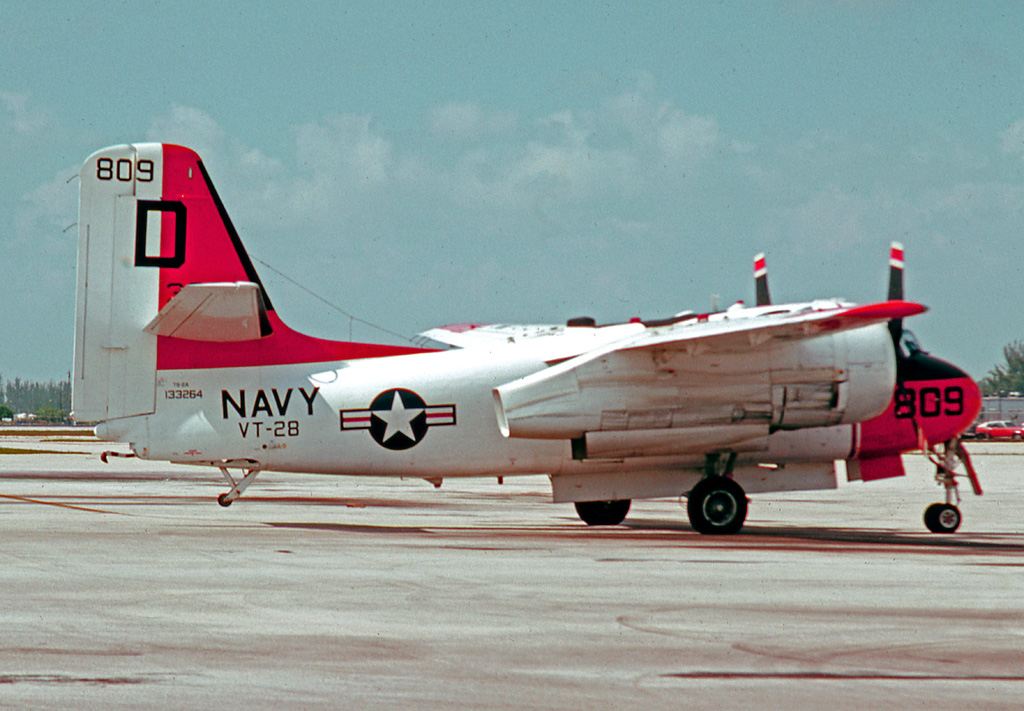
VT-28 TS-2A Tracker at Miami in 1976

VT-28 was initially established as Advanced Training Unit 611 (ATU-611). The Rangers began as an advanced multi-engine training squadron flying the S2F-1T, a training variant of the Grumman S-2 Tracker. On 1 May 1960 ATU-611 was redesignated VT-28 and in September 1962 its aircraft was redesignated the TS-2A in accordance with the 1962 United States Tri-Service aircraft designation system.

After decades of use and the designation of thousands of Naval Aviators, the TS-2A was replaced with the T-44A Pegasus twin-engine turboprop trainer in 1979. VT-28 continued training advanced multi-engine aviators until 1990 when the Chief of Naval Air Training (CNATRA) reassigned the squadron to be responsible for training instructors and updating training syllabi for the T-44A and T-34C Turbo Mentor. Three years later, CNATRA again reassigned VT-28, this time to be the Navy's fifth primary training squadron flying the T-34C Turbo Mentor. In 2013 the squadron began its transition from the T-34C to the Navy's newest primary flight trainer, the Beechcraft T-6B Texan II

== Aircraft ==
- S2F-1T / TS-2A Tracker - Advanced multi-engine (1960-1979)
- T-44A King Air - Advanced multi-engine (1979-1993)
- T-34C Turbo Mentor - Primary flight training (1990-2013)
- T-6B Texan II - Primary flight training (2013 to present)

== See also ==
- List of United States Navy aircraft squadrons
- List of inactive United States Navy aircraft squadrons
