= Marsh Aviation =

US aircraft engineering, design, maintenance and re-manufacturing company

Marsh Aviation International, Inc
- Company type: Aerospace
- Founded: December 29, 1961
- Headquarters: Falcon Field, Mesa, Arizona, USA
- Key people: Floyd Stilwell, CEO
- Services: Aircraft engineering & maintenance, systems design and manufacture

Marsh Aviation is an aircraft engineering, design, maintenance and re-manufacturing company, situated on East Falcon Drive, at Falcon Field in Mesa, Arizona. The company often works as a sub-contractor to well-known brand-name aerospace companies, discreetly designing and manufacturing components and sub-systems for high-profile programs. The company has also worked on a variety of aircraft programs for governments all over the world.

Founded in December 1961 to convert piston-powered aircraft to turboprop power, the company's first projects involved fitting Rockwell Thrush Commander agricultural aircraft with Garrett AiResearch TPE-331 engines. Later, the firm also re-engined Gulfstream Turbo Cats, Beech Turbo Mentors and Grumman S-2 Trackers with Garrett engines.

The company filed for Chapter 11 bankruptcy in September 2009.

Some of Marsh Aviation's aircraft engineering modification programs include:

- Grumman S-2F3AT Turbo Tracker, a re-engined Grumman S-2 Tracker, with Garrett TPE331 engines. Six converted for Argentine Navy.
- Rockwell/Ayres S2R-T Turbo Thrush airplane, a turboprop conversion of the Rockwell Thrush Commander, using a 600 hp (450 kW) Garrett TPE331-1-101 engine. Deliveries started in 1976. 75 conversions were completed by 1985.
- Grumman G164C Turbo Cat airplane, a turboprop conversion of the Grumman Super Ag Cat C/600. Six converted.
