= Sécurité Civile =

Civil defense agency of the French Government

The emblem of Sécurité Civile which includes the international civil defense symbol.

The Direction générale de la sécurité civile et de la gestion des crises (General directorate for civil defense and crisis management) is a civil defense agency of the French Government. It operates under the Ministry of the Interior and employs some 2,500 civilian and military personnel over 60 sites. Known as the Protection Civile until 1976, the Sécurité Civile is split into several branches:

- The inspection générale de la sécurité civile, which is in charge of auditing civil defense public policies.
- The Direction des Sapeur-pompiers, which is in charge of French firefighters.
- The service de la planification et de la gestion des crises, which is the crisis oversight service. It includes the units involved in bomb disposal, coast guard, mountain rescue, air ambulance and medical evacuation, and aerial firefighting duties.
- The sous-direction des affaires internationales, des ressources et de la stratégie (sub-directorate of international affairs, resources and strategy).

== Aircraft ==
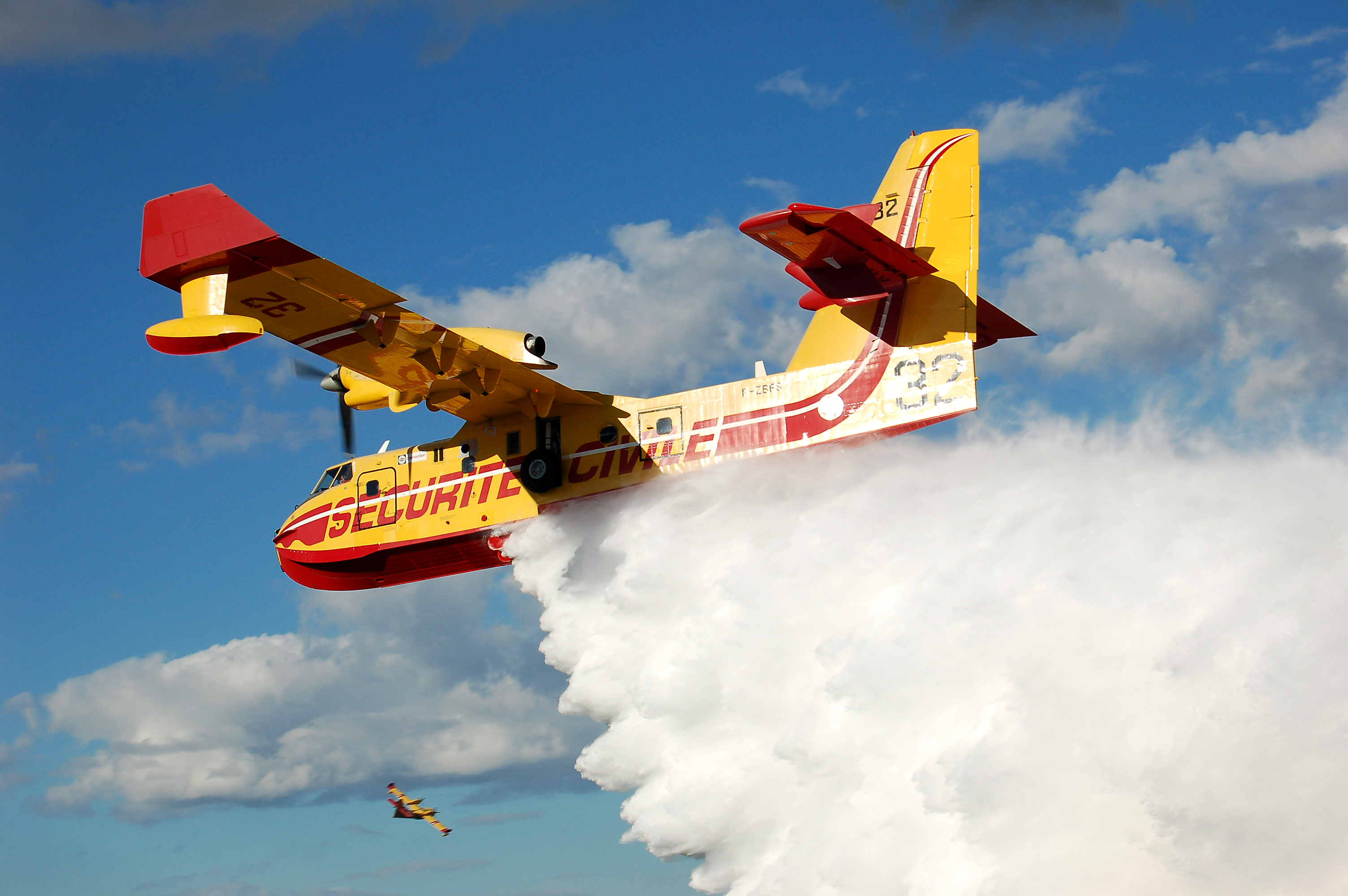
Bombardier 415 "Superscoop" of Sécurité Civile

Sécurité Civile aircraft operate under the rescue operation and civil-military cooperation branch of the Groupement des Moyens Aériens Sécurité Civile (Aerial Group). Aircraft carry the title SECURITE CIVILE on their fuselage sides, together with the international civil defence symbol. The aircraft are divided into the Groupement des Helicopteres de la Securite Civile (Helicopter Group) and the Groupement des Avions Bombardiers d'Eau (Water Bomber Group).

=== Helicopter group ===
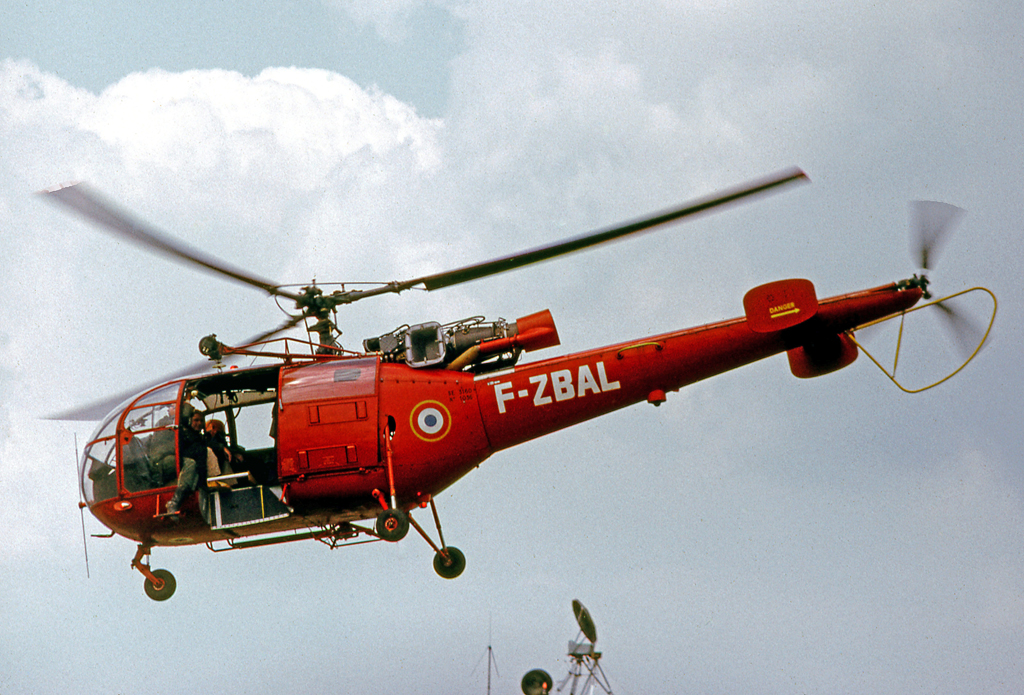
Aérospatiale Alouette III of the Protection Civile demonstrating at Paris–Le Bourget Airport in 1973.

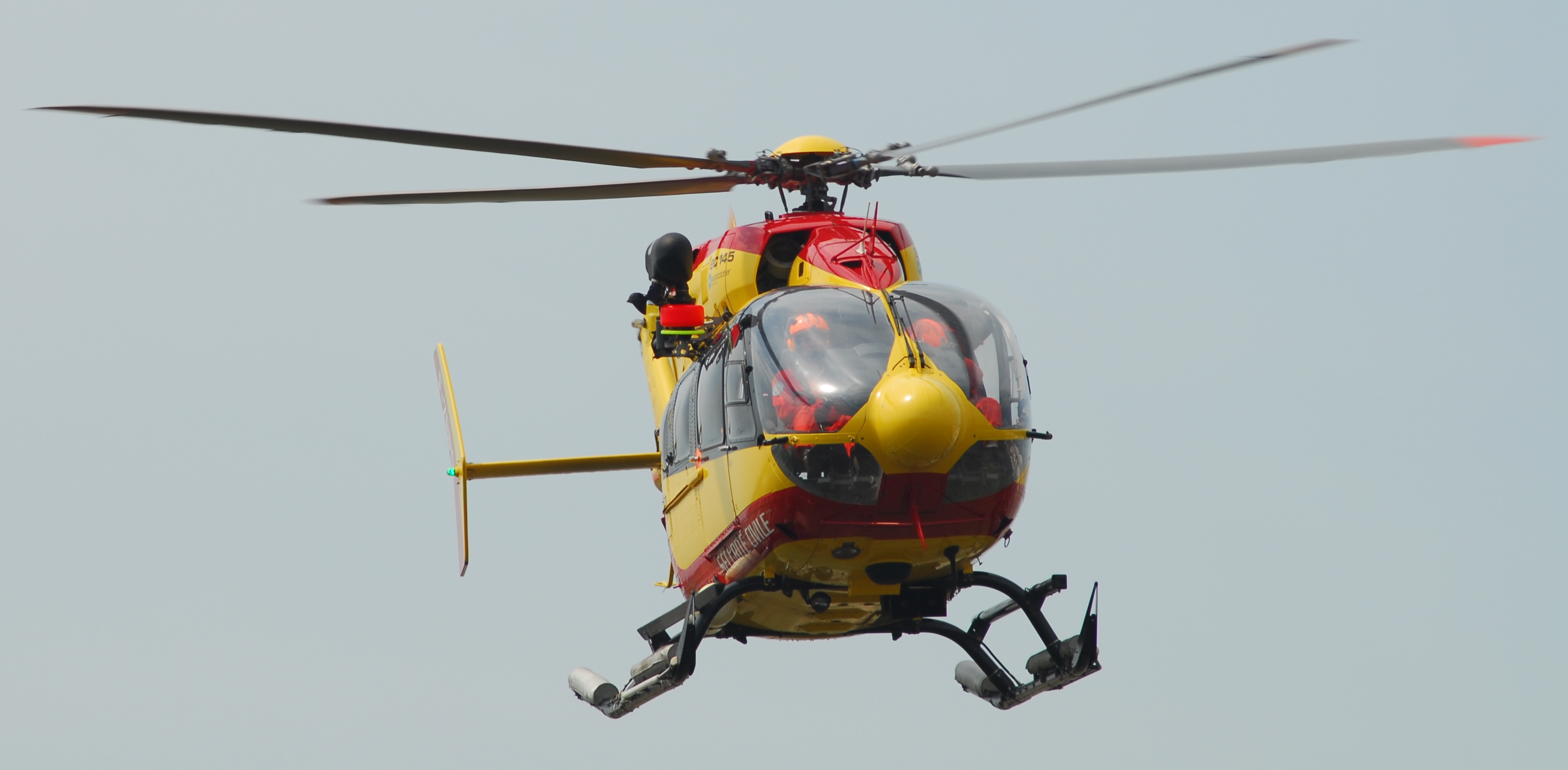
Eurocopter EC145 over Marignane Airport, Marseille, 2007

The Sécurité Civile helicopter group has 23 helicopter bases in mainland France and its overseas territories. It has a fleet of 35 helicopters and employs 230 pilots and flight engineers and 50 ground engineers. Over its 50 years of activity, the helicopter group has a track record of 480,000 flight hours, 250,000 rescue missions and 225,000 people rescued. Helicopter group aircraft use the callsign "DRAGON", followed by the number of the département in which their base is located.

- Eurocopter EC145 (35)

Sécurité Civile currently operates 35 EC-145 helicopters that were delivered between 2002 and 2005. The fleet has accumulated over 100,000 flight hours. The EC-145 fleet is used for search and rescue, fire fighting, emergency medical services (EMS), surveillance and law enforcement. EC-145s are deployed on 22 Sécurité Civile bases in France and the French Overseas Territories. An order has been placed for a further five helicopters, to be delivered from January 2009. This will enable the phasing out of the six remaining Alouette III helicopters. The EC 145 carries out an average 10,000 rescue missions each year, representing over 13,300 flight hours.

==== Bases ====
Helicopter group bases of operation are located at:.

- Ajaccio (Corsica)
- Annecy
- Bastia (Corsica)
- Besançon
- Bordeaux
- Cannes
- Clermont-Ferrand
- Granville
- Grenoble
- Le Havre
- Lille
- Lorient
- Lyon
- Marseille
- Montpellier
- Paris - Issy-les-Moulineaux
- Pau
- Perpignan
- Pointe-à-Pitre (Guadeloupe)
- Quimper
- La Rochelle
- Strasbourg

The Echelon Central (command centre), and helicopter maintenance base is located in Nîmes.

Helicopters are detached to several other bases seasonally. In summer, aircraft are detached to Courchevel, Alpes d'Huez, Gavarnie, Lacanau, and Chamonix. In winter, aircraft are detached to Chamonix and Alpes d'Huez.

=== Water bomber group ===
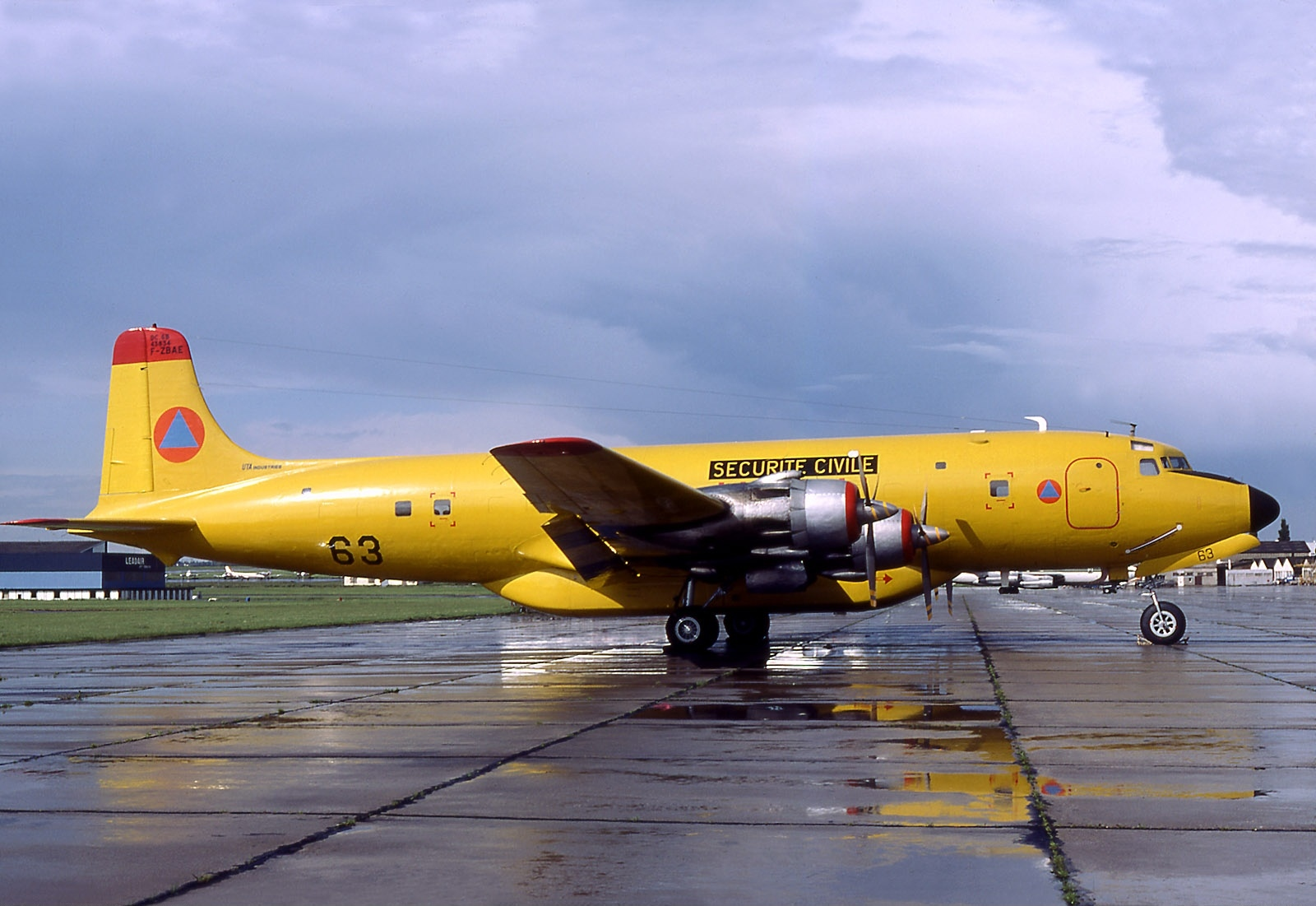
A former Douglas DC-6 at Paris–Le Bourget Airport

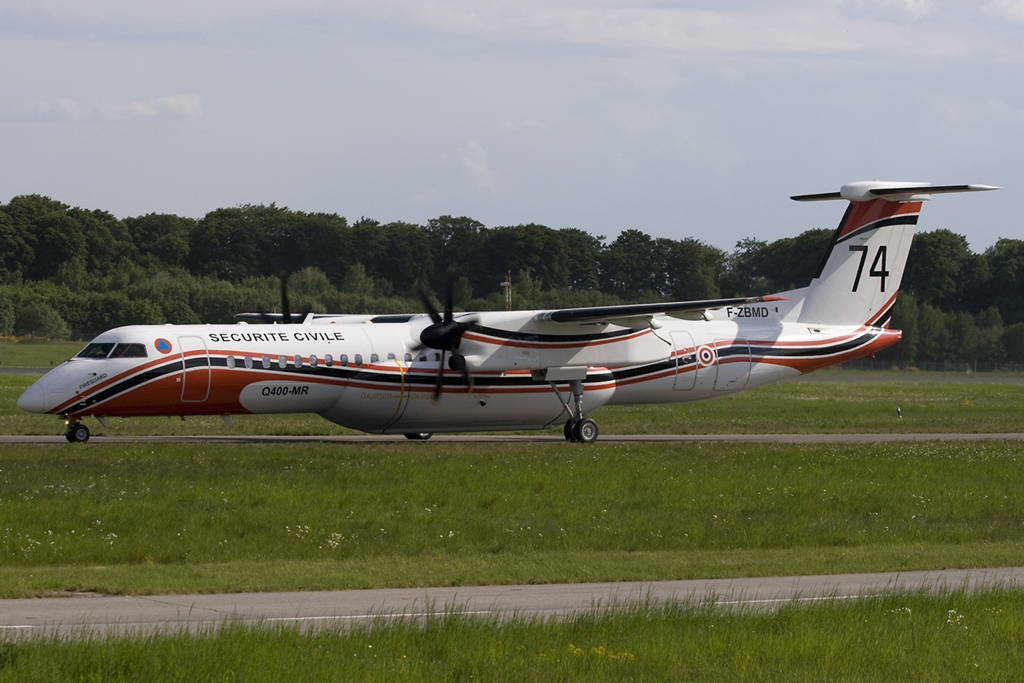
Bombardier Dash 8 Sécurité Civile, France at Luxembourg Findel Airport

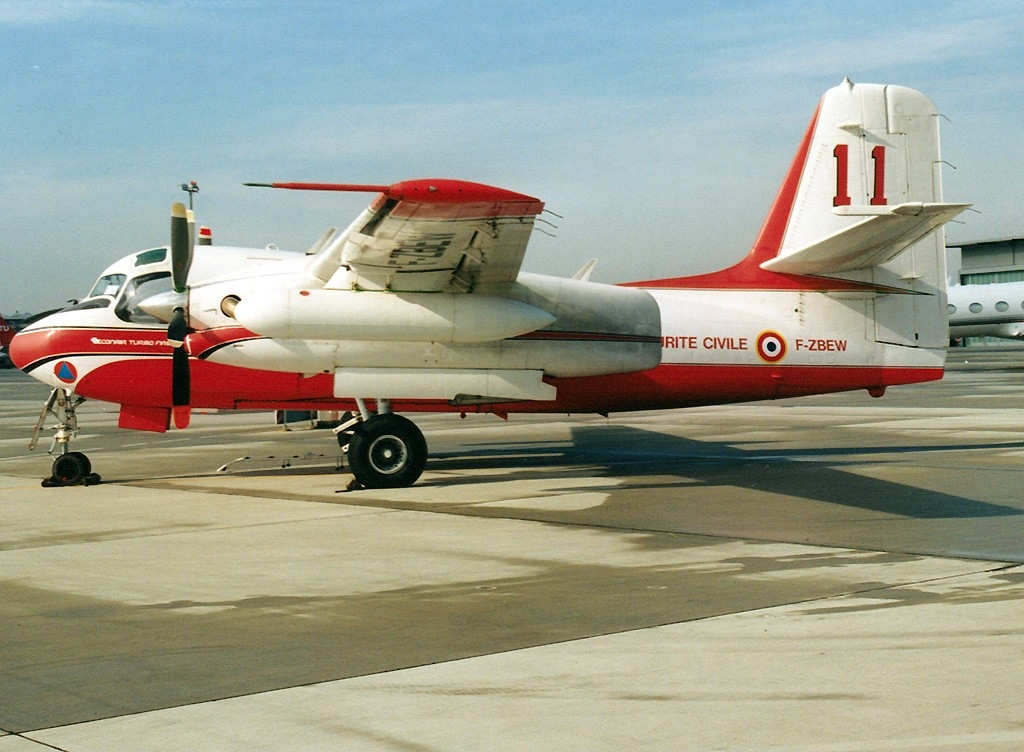
Sécurité Civile Conair Turbo Firecat at Stuttgart Airport

- Bombardier 415 (12)

12 Bombardier 415s are currently operated by the Sécurité Civile, each able to drop 6,137 L (1,350 imp gal; 1,621 US gal). France was the first nation to commit to the CL-415 Canadair in 1992, so that it could phase out its Canadair CL-215s.

- Bombardier Dash 8 (8)

Two pre-owned Bombardier Dash 8 Q400s, acquired from Scandinavian Airlines System, were modified by Cascade Aerospace of Abbotsford, British Columbia, for the Sécurité Civile to act as fire-fighting water bombers during fire season and as transport aircraft during the off season. This aircraft is designated the Q400-MR (Multi Role). The aircraft can be reconfigured into passenger, cargo or aerial fire control roles in under three hours and can drop 10,000 L (2,200 imp gal; 2,600 US gal) in the tanker role. 6 more were ordered in 2017 for 365M€, 4 of which were delivered by the end of 2021. Based at Garons Provence Airport.

- Beechcraft Super King Air 200 (3)

==== Bases ====
All fixed-wing aircraft are based at Garons Provence Airport.

== Bomb disposal ==
307 Sécurité Civile bomb disposal experts are based at 20 bomb disposal units, including 2 overseas units (Guadeloupe and French Guiana). They are responsible for the detection, removal, disposal or destruction of suspicious objects. They also provide assistance during official travel or large demonstrations and disarm and destroy dormant ammunition still present from the two world wars.

In 2004, 440 tonnes (430 long tons; 490 short tons) of munitions was disposed of, whilst forty-three bomb disposal experts were deployed on the sixtieth anniversary of the Normandy landings, seventeen on the sixtieth anniversary of the landing in Provence, and sixteen during the visit of Pope John Paul II to Lourdes.
