= Cascade Aerospace =

Canadian aerospace and defence contractor

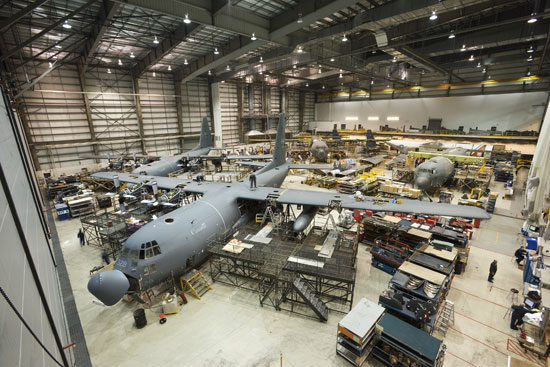
C130s in Cascade Aerospace's Hangar

Cascade Aerospace Inc. of Abbotsford, British Columbia, Canada, is a specialty aerospace and defence contractor, focused on providing long-term integrated aircraft support programs for original equipment manufacturers (OEMs), military, government and commercial customers.

Cascade Aerospace is a member of the Aerospace Industries Association of Canada (AIAC). Cascade Aerospace was formerly a division of Conair Group, however in 2012 Cascade was acquired by the IMP Group of Halifax, Nova Scotia.

== Facilities ==
Cascade Aerospace is headquartered in a 21 000 m^{2} facility at the Abbotsford International Airport, in Abbotsford, British Columbia, Canada. The facility was built in 2000 and is designed and equipped to accommodate eight narrow-body aircraft. Cascade also has a satellite operation in Trenton, Ontario on the Canadian Forces Base.

== History ==
Cascade Aerospace Inc. began as an aircraft repair station, founded by Barry Marsden, who received his pilot's license at age 17. Marsden's enthusiasm for aviation led him to co-found the Conair Group, a specialty aviation services firm, in 1969.

Conair's initial focus was aerial forest fire control. The experience acquired in developing specialty aviation products and operating and maintaining a fleet of 90 aircraft gave Conair the expertise required to offer third-party maintenance and modifications. Cascade's leadership team continued to diversify the company, entering into the military realm in 2005 when the company received its first contract with Canada's Department of National Defence for the total fleet management of Canada's fleet of Lockheed C-130 Hercules tactical airlift aircraft. Cascade currently offers its services and products to aircraft operators worldwide, and is partnered with other global aerospace OEMs.

In 2010, Cascade received the contract for in-service support contract for the Royal Canadian Air Force's new CC-130J Super Hercules. In 2013, Cascade received a contract worth up to CA$225 million for long-term maintenance services on the planes. The contract is for work on Canada's CC-130H Hercules fleet's avionics system This newest contract bundles several smaller ones under a broader framework, making Cascade the prime service provider for various elements of the aircraft's avionics systems.

== Aircraft Types ==
- Lockheed Martin C-130, L-382 and L-100 Hercules and C-130J Super Hercules
- Boeing 737 and Boeing 757
- Bombardier Q400, Dash 8 series
- Bombardier CRJ 100/200 regional aircraft
- Canadair CL-215 and CL-215T water scooper aircraft

== See also ==
- Bombardier Aerospace
- COM DEV International
- CMC Electronics
- Héroux-Devtek
- MacDonald, Dettwiler and Associates
- Spar Aerospace
- Viking Air
