= Canadair CL-415 =

Dedicated aerial fire fighting airplane

CL-415 / DHC-515
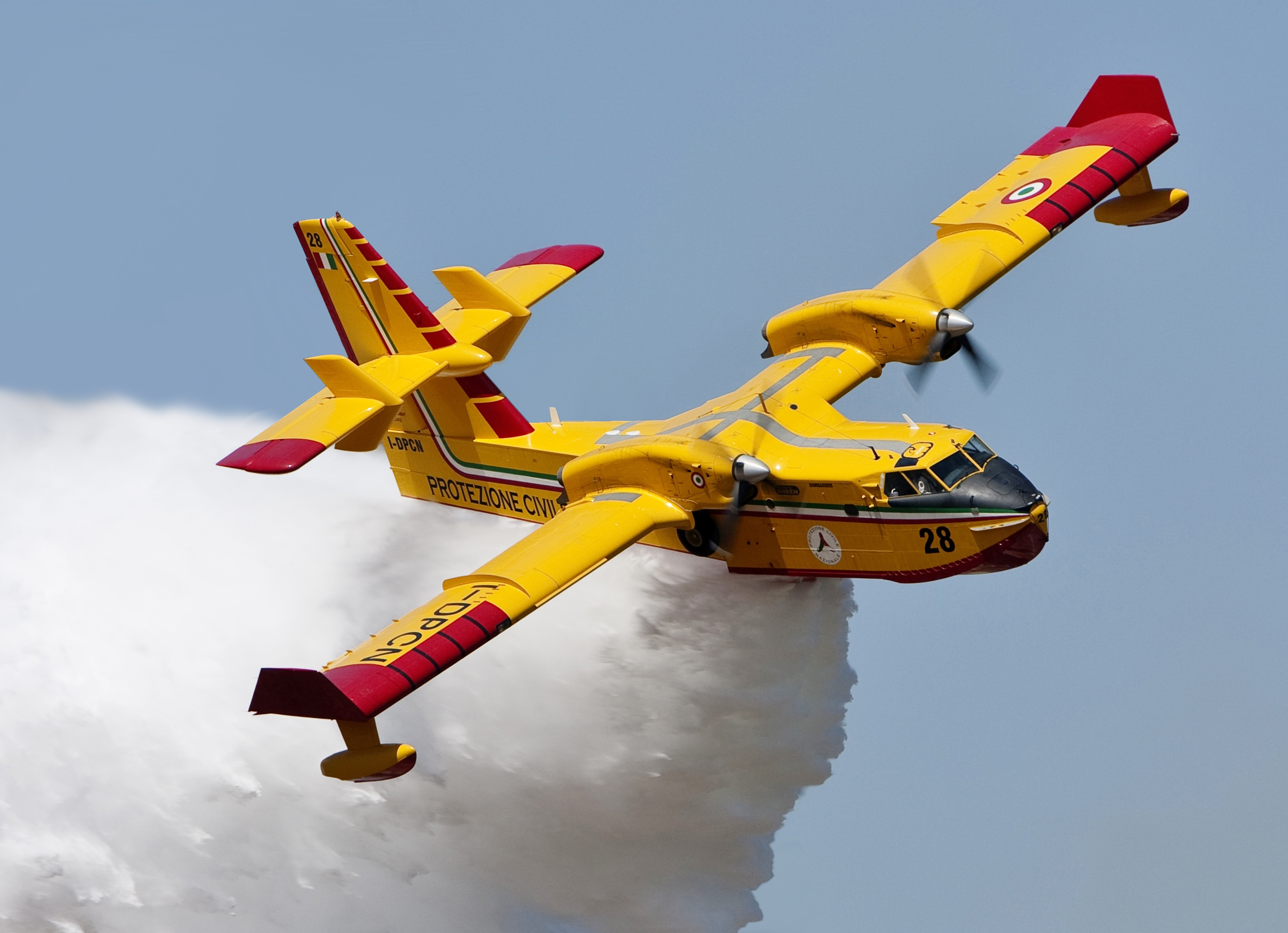

General information
- Role: Firefighting aircraft
- National origin: Canada
- Manufacturer: Canadair; Bombardier Aerospace; De Havilland Canada
- Status: In service
- Primary users: Vigili del Fuoco (Italy) Sécurité Civile (France); Hellenic Air Force (Greece); Service Aérien Gouvernemental
- Number built: 95

History
- Manufactured: CL-415: 1993–2015; DHC-515: 2026–
- Introduction date: 1994
- First flight: 6 December 1993
- Developed from: Canadair CL-215

The Canadair CL-415 (Super Scooper, later Bombardier 415) and the De Havilland Canadair DHC-515 are a series of amphibious aircraft built originally by Canadair and subsequently by Bombardier and De Havilland Canada. The CL-415 is based on the Canadair CL-215 and is designed specifically for aerial firefighting, although it can perform various other roles, such as search and rescue and utility transport.

Development of the CL-415 began in the early 1990s, shortly after the success of the CL-215T retrofit programme had proven a viable demand for a turboprop-powered model of the original CL-215. Entering production in 2003, in addition to its new engines, the aircraft featured numerous modernisation efforts and advances over the CL-215, particularly in terms of its cockpit and aerodynamics, to yield improved performance. By the time the programme's production phase had begun, it was owned by Bombardier, who continued production up until 2015. In October 2016, the CL-415 programme was acquired by Viking Air, aiming to produce an updated CL-515, since renamed the De Havilland Canadair 515, and to be produced in both Victoria and Calgary by De Havilland Canada.

== Development ==
=== Origins ===
Introduced during 1966, the CL-215 was the first aircraft specifically designed to be a water bomber. A total of 125 aircraft were constructed prior to the final CL-215 being delivered during May 1990.

During 1987, in response to prevailing market trends towards more efficient, powerful and reliable turboprop powerplants, Canadair undertook the task of retrofitting 17 CL-215 airframes with the Pratt & Whitney Canada PW123AF engines. This engine provided a 15 percent power increase over the original piston engines, as well as enhanced reliability and safety. The retrofitted aircraft were designated CL-215T. Speaking during the new model's development, company officials recognised that market demand for the CL-215T was marginal, and thus not enough to justify developing an all-new aircraft. Despite this, it featured numerous enhancements, including the addition of powered flight controls, air conditioning in the cockpit, as well as various upgraded electrical and avionics systems. The most notable external features of the CL-215T retrofit were the aerodynamic additions to the wings and empennage.

Having conducted the relatively successful CL-215T programme, the company decided to develop the CL-415, which would be a new production series. On 6 December 1993, the CL-415 conducted its maiden flight, while the first deliveries commenced during November 1994. One year later, a 180-day sales tour traversing 21 countries commenced using a CL-415 owned by the Quebec Government. That same year, Bombardier stated that it was in the planning phase of a six-point improvement plan for the CL-415, which was principally intended to diversify its capabilities.

Orders for the type were promptly received from several countries, which included several lease and purchase arrangements; by July 1996, 37 examples were reportedly in service with operators in Canada, France, Italy, and Spain. Starting in 1998, the CL-415 was being assembled at Bombardier Aerospace's facility near North Bay/Jack Garland Airport in North Bay, Ontario, and tested on Lake Nipissing. During the 2010s, according to aerospace periodical Flight International, there was a downturn in sales of the type. A total of ninety-five CL-415s had been completed when Bombardier closed down the production line in October 2015, although the company continued to actively market the type as well as to provide support for the existing fleet beyond this date.

=== Viking era ===
For several decades, Bombardier had experienced a period of significant expansion until encountering financial hardship during the 2010s, largely brought on by the very high costs involved in developing the CSeries narrow-body airliner. The much smaller Viking Aircraft started off as a component manufacturing specialist, which came to include the licensed production of parts of several of Bombardier's discontinued aircraft range, helping operators to keep them in service. During 2008, Bombardier and Viking Air reached an arrangement under which the former sold the design documents and all intellectual property rights of all out-of-production de Havilland aircraft from the DHC-1 Chipmunk through the DASH-7 50 passenger STOL regional airliner to Viking. Its unit cost in 2014 was 36.9 million US dollars.

On 20 June 2016, it was announced that Viking Air was in the process of purchasing the CL-415 type certificate from Bombardier, along with the older CL-215 and CL-215T models. The acquisition was finalised on 3 October 2016. Shortly following the acquisition, Viking began work on the design of a modernized CL-515 version.

In May 2018 Bridger Aerospace of Bozeman, Montana became the launch customer for the CL-415EAF "Enhanced Aerial Firefighter" with a $204 million contract for up to six aircraft.

During December 2018, a full-flight CL-415 simulator, capable of simulating water scoop and bombing operations, received European Aviation Safety Agency (EASA) certification. Prior to this a full flight simulator was built and establish in Sault Ste Marie Ontario in May of 2013. Certified to FTD Level 6 by Transport Canada, the Mechtronix CL-415 FFT X has been acquired to allow provincial CL-415 pilots and engineers to train in Ontario on a simulator tailored to their needs rather than travelling outside the province, saving considerable time and costs for the Ontario Government.

On 21 June 2019, the Indonesian Ministry of Defense announced it was purchasing six CL-515s and one CL-415EAF for delivery in 2024.

On 31 March 2022, Viking Air through De Havilland Canada renamed the CL-515 as the DHC-515, planning for production and final assembly in Calgary, Alberta, Canada, where the CL-215 and CL-415 are supported, with 22 letters of intent from European customers.

On 25 March 2024, Greek prime minister Kyriakos Mitsotakis and Canadian prime minister Justin Trudeau announced a deal to purchase $530-million worth of DHC-515s from De Havilland to help deal with the country's severe wildfire seasons.

In March 2026, De Havilland announced that assembly of the first DHC-515 had started in Calgary, with a view to first delivery in 2028.

== Design ==
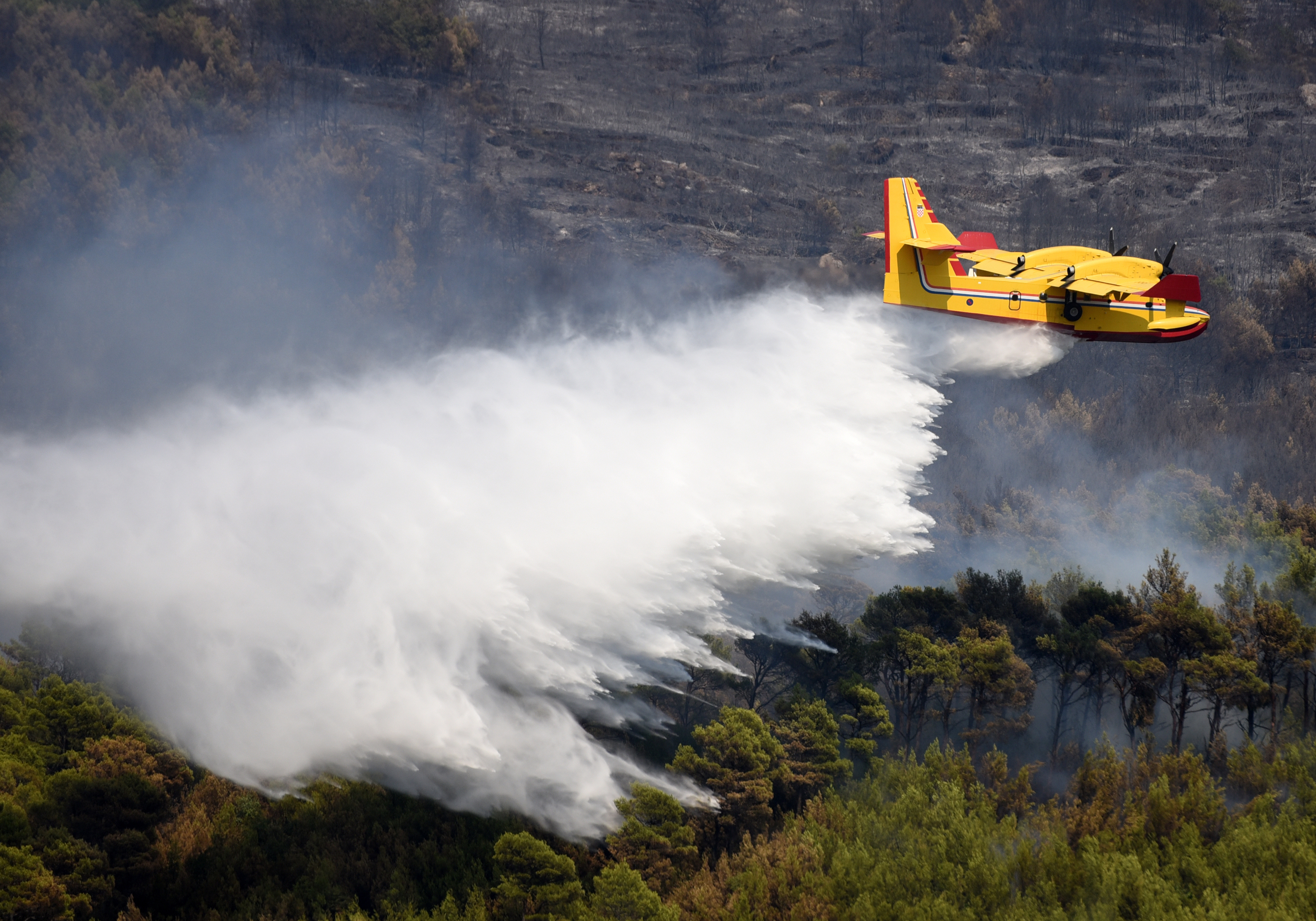
A Croatian Air Force CL-415 during fire season.

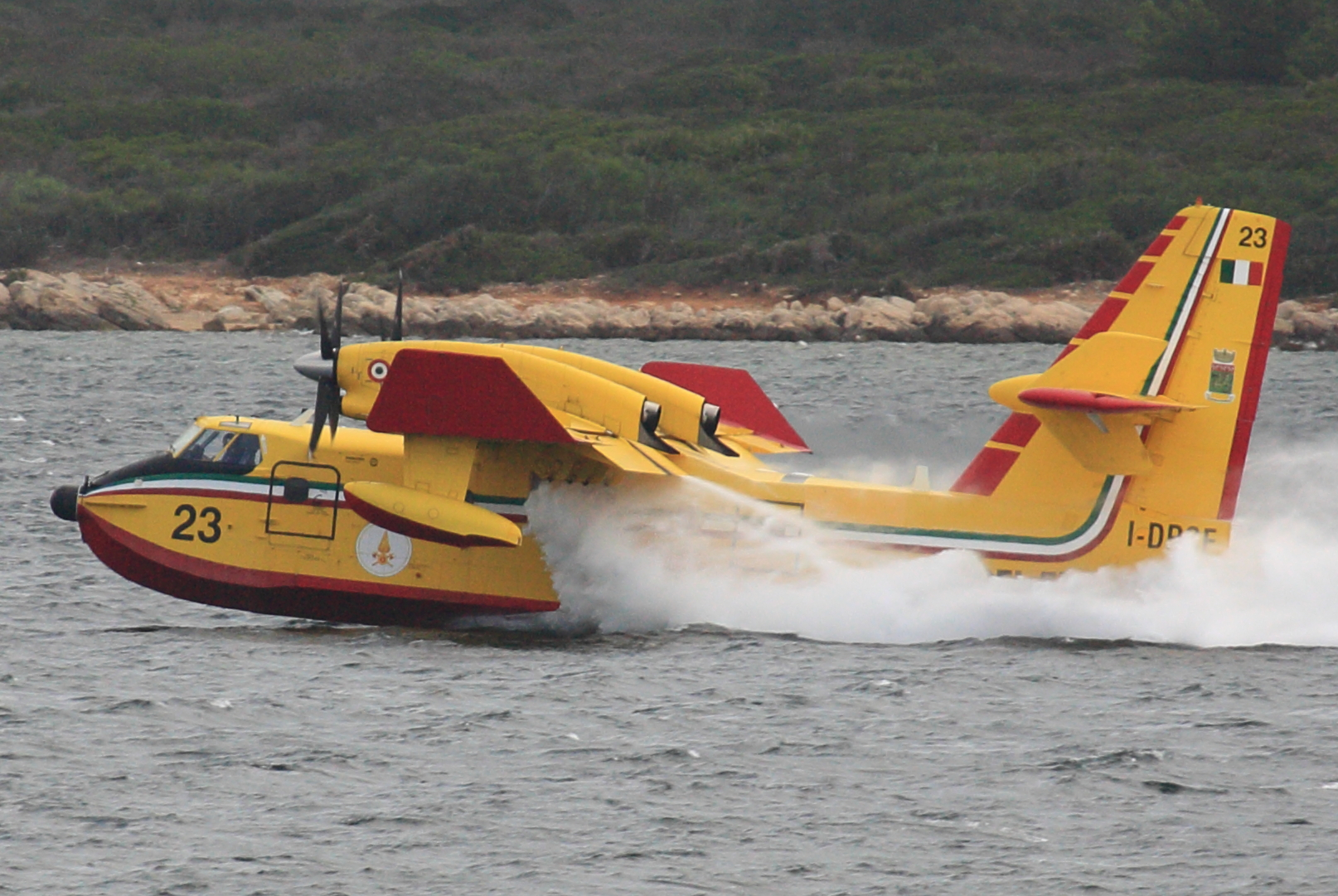
Italian Vigili del Fuoco refilling near Alghero, spilling excess water through underwing overflow ports

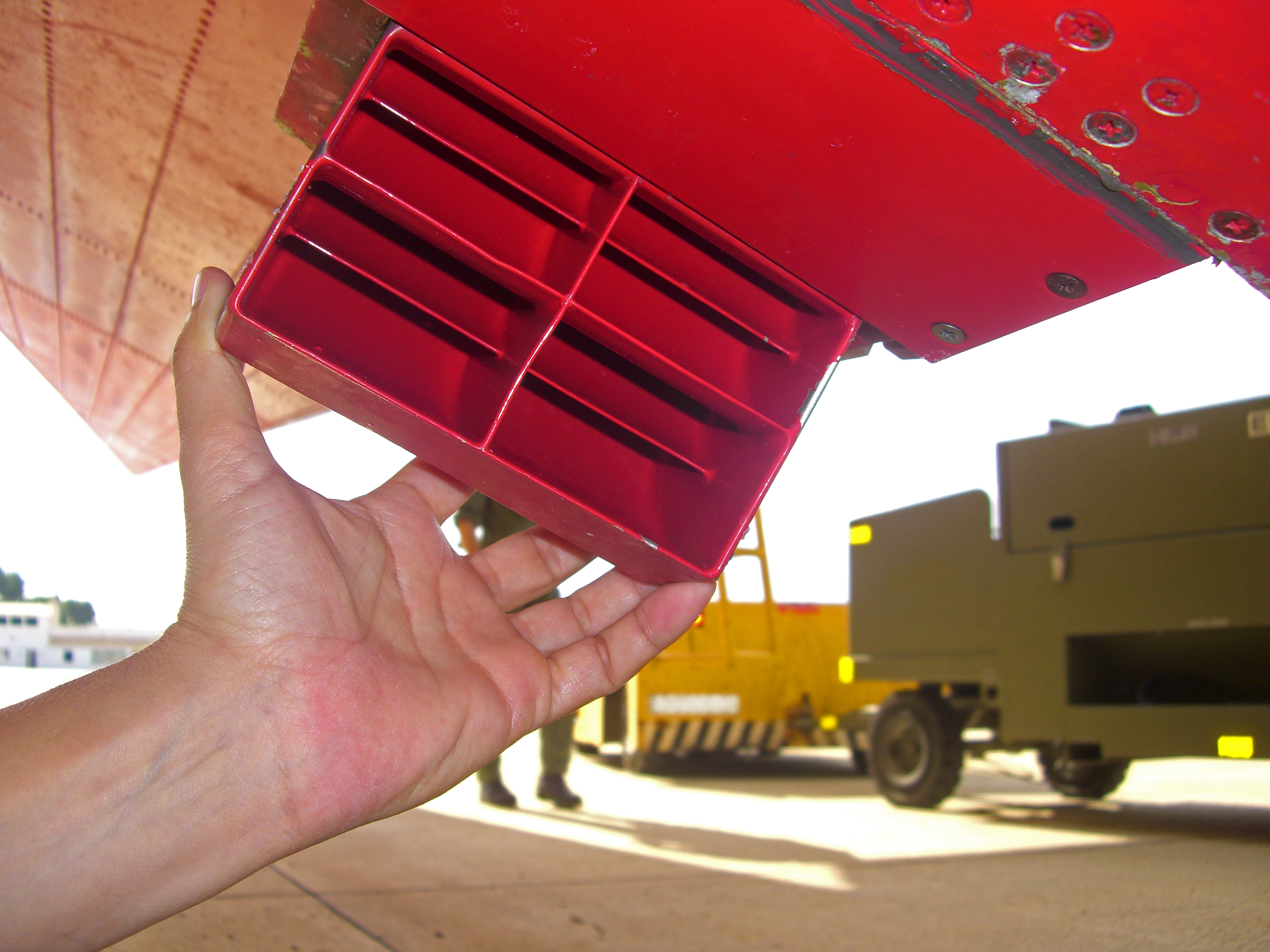
Water scoop of a CL-415

The CL-415 has an updated cockpit, aerodynamics enhancements, and changes to the water-release system creating a modern firefighting amphibious flying boat for use in detecting and suppressing forest fires. Compared to the CL-215, the CL-415 has increased operating weight and speed, yielding improved productivity and performance. Due to the increased power of its pair of Pratt & Whitney Canada PW123AF turboprop engines, each capable of generating up to 1,775 kW of power, these are located closer to the fuselage in comparison to the CL-215's arrangement. While this repositioning would typically reduce lateral stability on its own, this is rectified via the addition of an inverted fixed leading edge slat forward of the righthand horizontal stabiliser. Furthermore, winglets have been adopted on this model for the purpose of improving directional stability.

The CL-415 can scoop up to 6,140 L (1,350 imp gal; 1,620 US gal) of water from a nearby water source, mix it with a chemical foam if desired, and drop it on a fire without having to return to base to refill its tanks. The CL-415 was specifically developed to provide the capability to deliver large quantities of suppressant in quick response to fires. This is stored within large tanks which are located mostly beneath the cabin floor within the hull, although a header tank above this level is present on either side of the fuselage. The airframe is built for reliability and longevity, making extensive use of corrosion-resistant materials, predominantly treated aluminium, that facilitates its use in salt water. According to Flight International, the CL-415 has good handling on the water, being relatively easy to operate in comparison with several other amphibious aircraft. The CL-515 can hold up to 7,000 litres (1,850 US gallons), and has a refill time of 14 seconds.

The aircraft requires 1,340 m (4,400 ft) of flyable length to descend from 15 m (49 ft) altitude, scoop 6,137 L (1,350 imp gal; 1,621 US gal) of water during a twelve-second 410-metre-long (1,350 ft) run on the water at 70 knots (130 km/h; 81 mph), then climb back to 15 m (49 ft) altitude. The aircraft can also pick up partial loads in smaller areas, and can turn while scooping if necessary. Management of the water bombing system is centralised via a water status panel on the flight instrumentation, giving direct control to the pilots; various dispersal patterns and sequences can be selected. A manually operated emergency dump lever is also present, bypassing this system. Bombardier have claimed that the type performs 6.9 water drops for every flight hour of the type. The CL-415GR variant features higher operating weights, while the CL-415 multi-role model is available for purposes in a paramilitary search and rescue role and utility transport.

== Operational history ==
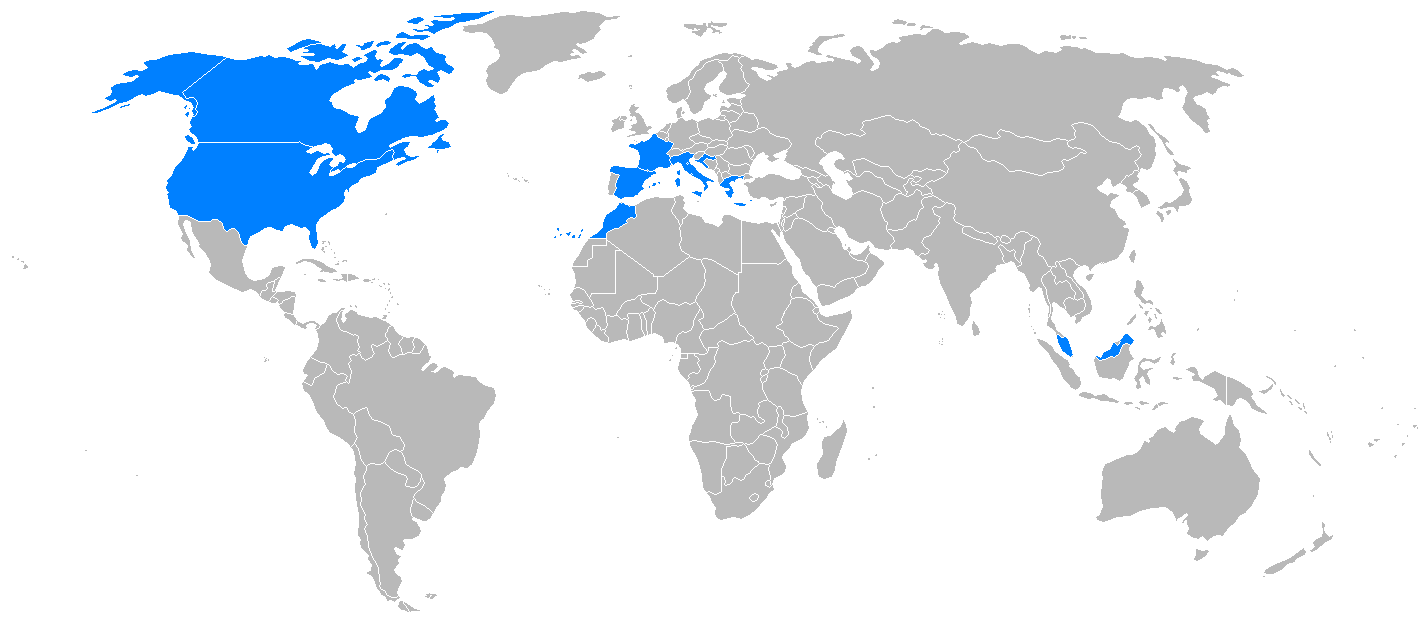
World operators of the CL-415

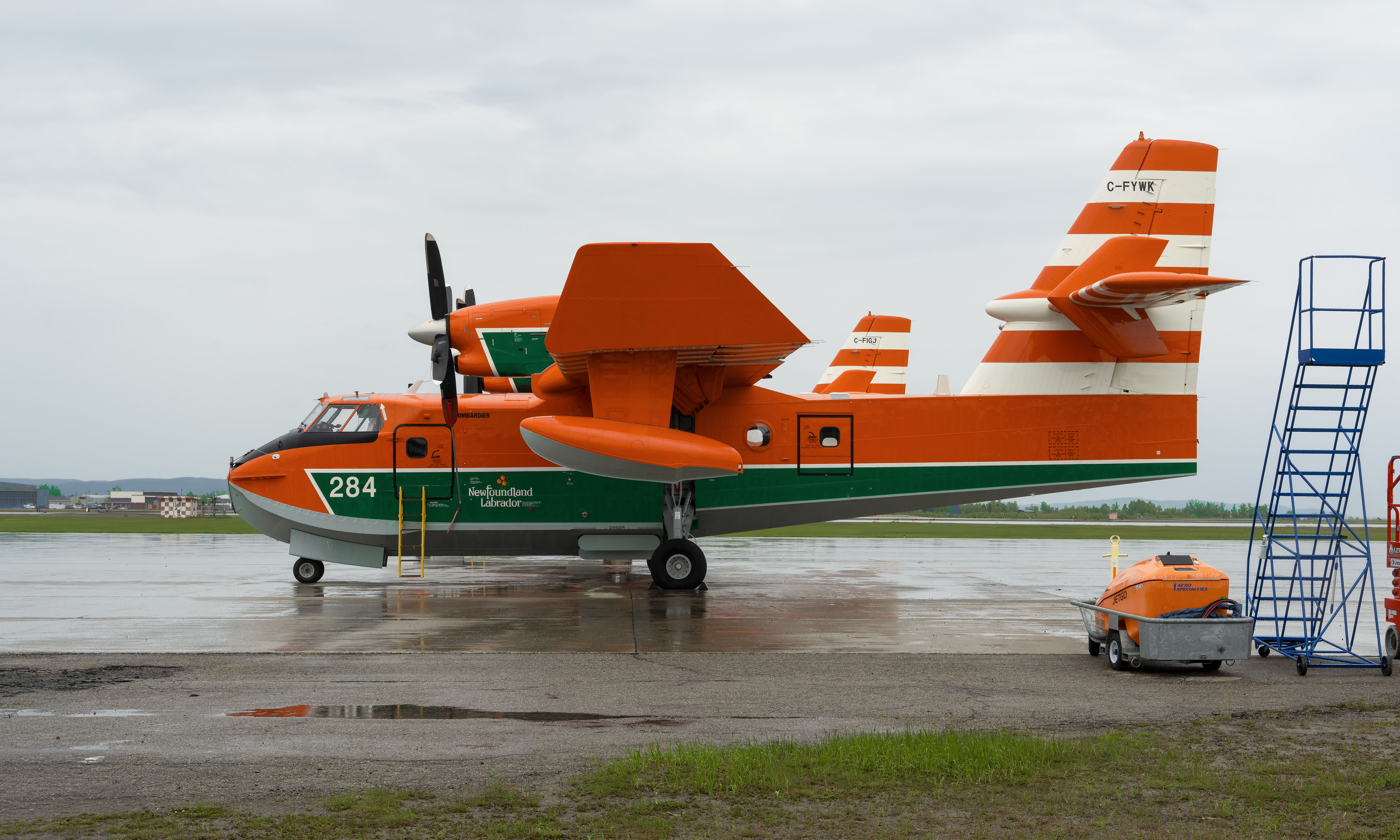
Government of Newfoundland and Labrador CL-415 at CFB Goose Bay

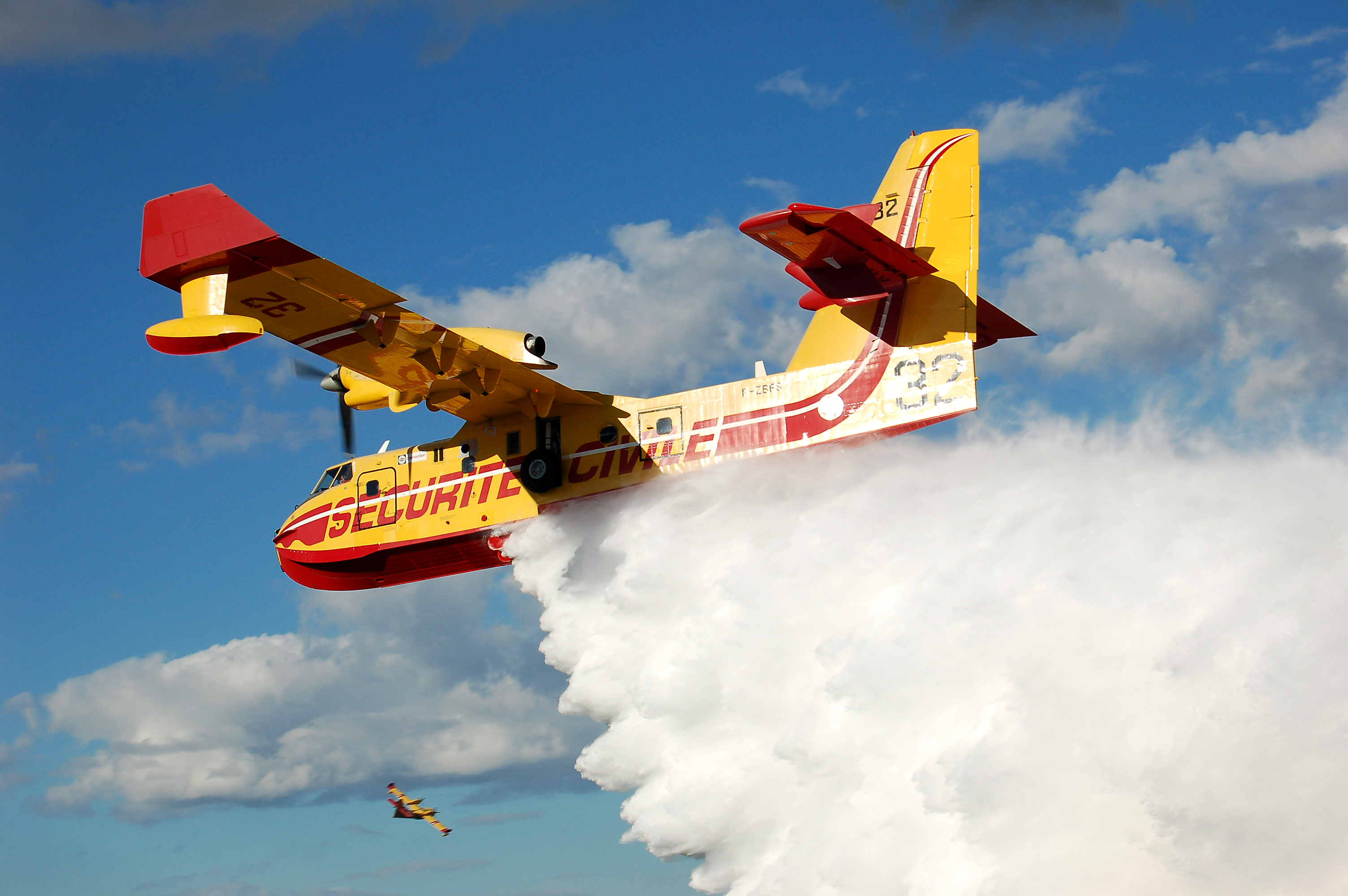
French Sécurité Civile CL-415 dropping water

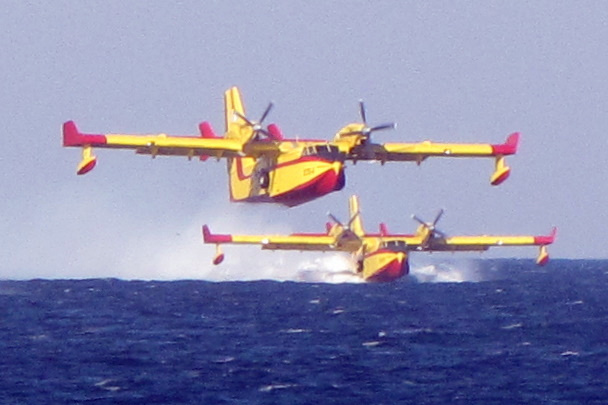
Two Hellenic Air Force CL-415 refilling off the coast of Atlit to fight the 2010 Mount Carmel forest fire

Derived from its predecessor's nickname, the aircraft is known as the "Superscooper" in light of its greatly enhanced performance as a water bomber and fire suppressor. In recognition of its abilities, the aircraft was awarded in 2006 the Batefuegos de oro (gold fire extinguisher) by the Asociacion para la Promocion de Actividades Socioculturales (APAS) in Spain; the award citation in part read, "This is the most efficient tool for the aerial combat of forest fires, key to the organization of firefighting in a large number of countries. The continuous improvements to meet the needs of forest firefighting have made these aircraft the aerial means most in demand over more than 30 years."

By 1999, a total of 51 orders had been secured for the type; operators have reportedly predominantly used the CL-415 for firefighting and maritime search and rescue purposes. Of the 95 built, seven had reportedly been removed from service as a result of several accidents by December 2007.

== Variants ==
CL-415
The original model, 86 built.

CL-415MP
Maritime patrol version, three built.

CL-415GR
Improved version for the Hellenic Air Force, capable of higher operating weights. Six built.

CL-415EAF
Enhanced Aerial Firefighter. In 2019, six CL-415EAF Superscooper aircraft were ordered by launch customer, Bridger Aerospace, due for delivery in April 2020.

De Havilland Canadair 515 (formerly CL-515)
Updated version by Viking Air, later renamed as the DHC-515. Parts of the fuselage and wings will be manufactured in North Saanich, British Columbia near Victoria International Airport, while final assembly will be done in Calgary, Alberta.

== Operators ==
In 2016 / 2019, there were 164 in-service CL-215 and CL-415s in 11 countries.

Country	Fleet				Oprators
Country	CL-215	Cl-415	DHC-515	Total	Oprators
Canada	28	26	0 (+14 on order)	54 (+ 14 on order)	Public operators (as of July 2026): Newfoundland and Labrador Province - Ministry of Fisheries, Forestry and Agriculture Fire Suppression Program: CL-415 (CL-215-6B11): 5; Ontario Province - Ministry of Natural Resources: CL-415 (CL-215-6B11): 9; Québec Province - Service Aérien Gouvernemental: CL-215 (CL-215-1A10): 4; CL-215ST (CL-215-6B11): 2; CL-415 (CL-215-6B11): 8; Saskatchewan Province - Saskatchewan Public Safety Agency (Air Operations): CL-215ST (CL-215-6B11): 6; Private operators (as of July 2026): Air Spray - contractor for Government of Alberta Ministry of Forest and Parks Alberta Wildfire: CL-215 (CL-215-1A10): 3; CL-215ST (CL-215-6B11): 4; CL-415 (CL-215-6B11): 4; Buffalo Airways: CL-215 (CL-215-1A10): 7; De Havilland Aircraft of Canada Limited: CL-215ST (CL-215-6B11): 2; Orders: Government of Alberta: DHC-515: 5 ordered in February 2026 (delivery from 2031); Manitoba Province: DHC-515: 3 ordered in April 2026 (delivery in 2031-32); Ontario Province: DHC-515: 6 ordered in November 2025 (delivery early 2030s)
Croatia	0	6	0 (+2 on order)	6 (+2 on order)	Croatian Air Force: CL-415: 6 operated by the Croatian Fire Brigade 885th Firefighting Squadron; DHC-515: 2 ordered in 2024, among a common EU order (partially financed by the EU, and to be part of the rescEU reserve force to assist other countries when necessary)
France	0	12	0 (+4 on order)	12 (+4 on order)	Sécurité Civile: CL-415: 12; DHC-515: 2 ordered in 2024, among a common EU order (partially financed by the EU, and to be part of the rescEU reserve force to assist other countries when necessary ; delivery 2028); 2 ordered in May 2026 (delivery 2030)
Greece	10	7	0 (+7 on order)	17 (+7 on order)	Hellenic Air Force: CL-215: 16 purchased between 1973 and 1990, 6 were lost; CL-415: 10 purchased (8 firefighting, 2 in maritime patrol confiruration), 3 were lost, 7 remain in the fleet, contract signed in 2026 to upgrade the entire fleet; DHC-515: 7 ordered in 2024, among a common EU order (partially financed by the EU, and to be part of the rescEU reserve force to assist other countries when necessary ; delivery 2027-2030)
Indonesia	0	0	0 (+ 6 on order)	0 (+ 6 on order)	Indonesian Ministry of Defence: CL-415EAF: 1 ordered in June 2019; DHC-515: 6 ordered in June 2019 (as it was still Viking)
Italy	0	18	0 (+4 on order)	18 (+4 on order)	Vigili del Fuoco: CL-415: 18 in service, 19 purchased of which 1 was lost in 2022. Among the fleet, 13 are for exclusive Italian use, 2 in reserve for European support missions, and 3 in maintenance. The aircraft are operated by Avincis.; DHC-515: 4 ordered amond the 22 ordered by the EU nations as of August 2024 (partially financed by the EU, and to be part of the rescEU reserve force to assist other countries when necessary)
Malaysia	0	1	0	1	Malaysian Maritime Enforcement Agency: CL-415MP: 2 purchased (maritime patrol, SAR and firfighting roles), 1 retired in 2025.
Morocco	3	5	0	8	Royal Moroccan Air Force: CL-415: 5 delivered since 2011; CL-215: 3 purchased in 2021 (1970s aircraft) and modernised to the standard CL-415EAF by 2025.
Portugal	3	0	0 (+2 on order)	3 (+2 on order)	Portuguese Air Force: DHC-515: 2 ordered in 2024, among a common EU order (partially financed by the EU, and to be part of the rescEU reserve force to assist other countries when necessary ; delivery 2029); Private partnership: CL-215: 3 aircraft contracted by National Emergency and Civil Protection Authority, with Avincis (2 primary + 1 backup for 2025 - 2027)
Spain	14	4	0 (+7 on order)	18 (+7 on order)	Ministry for ecological transition / Spanish Air and Space Force: CL-215ST: 10; CL-415: 4; DHC-515: 7 ordered in 2024, among a common EU order (partially financed by the EU, and to be part of the rescEU reserve force to assist other countries when necessary ; delivery 2028-2031)
United States	8	0	0	8	Private operators (as of July 2026): Bridger Aerospace: 8 CL-415EAF, a modernised variant of the CL-215
Sub-total	66	80	0 (+46 on order)	146	
Total	146 (+46 on order)			146	

== Accidents ==
Out of the 155 CL-415s built, 11 have been destroyed in the following accidents:

- 11 November 1997 – s/n 2025 – F-ZBFQ/Pelican 43 – Sécurité Civile France, near La Ciotat (France).
- 16 August 2003 – s/n 2008 – I-DPCN – SOREM Italy, near Esine (Italy).
- 8 March 2004 – s/n 2018 – F-ZBEZ/Pelican 41 – Sécurité Civile France, at Sainte Croix Lake (France).
- 18 March 2005 – s/n 2051 – I-DPCK – SOREM Italy, near Seravezza (Italy).
- 1 August 2005 – s/n 2011 – F-ZBEO/Pelican 36 – Sécurité Civile France, near Pietra Maggiore - Corsica (France).
- 25 April 2006 – s/n 2039 – Hellenic Air Force.
- 23 July 2007 – s/n 2055 (CL-415MP) – Hellenic Air Force, near Styra (Greece).
- 23 July 2007 – s/n 2045 – I-DPCX – SOREM Italy, near Roccapreturo (Italy).
- 3 July 2013 – s/n 2076 – C-FIZU – Canada, at Moosehead Lake (Canada).
- 5 May 2014 – s/n 2050 – Hellenic Air Force.
- 27 Oct 2022 – s/n 2070 – I-DPCN – Linguaglossa, Sicily, Italy

== Specifications (CL-415) ==
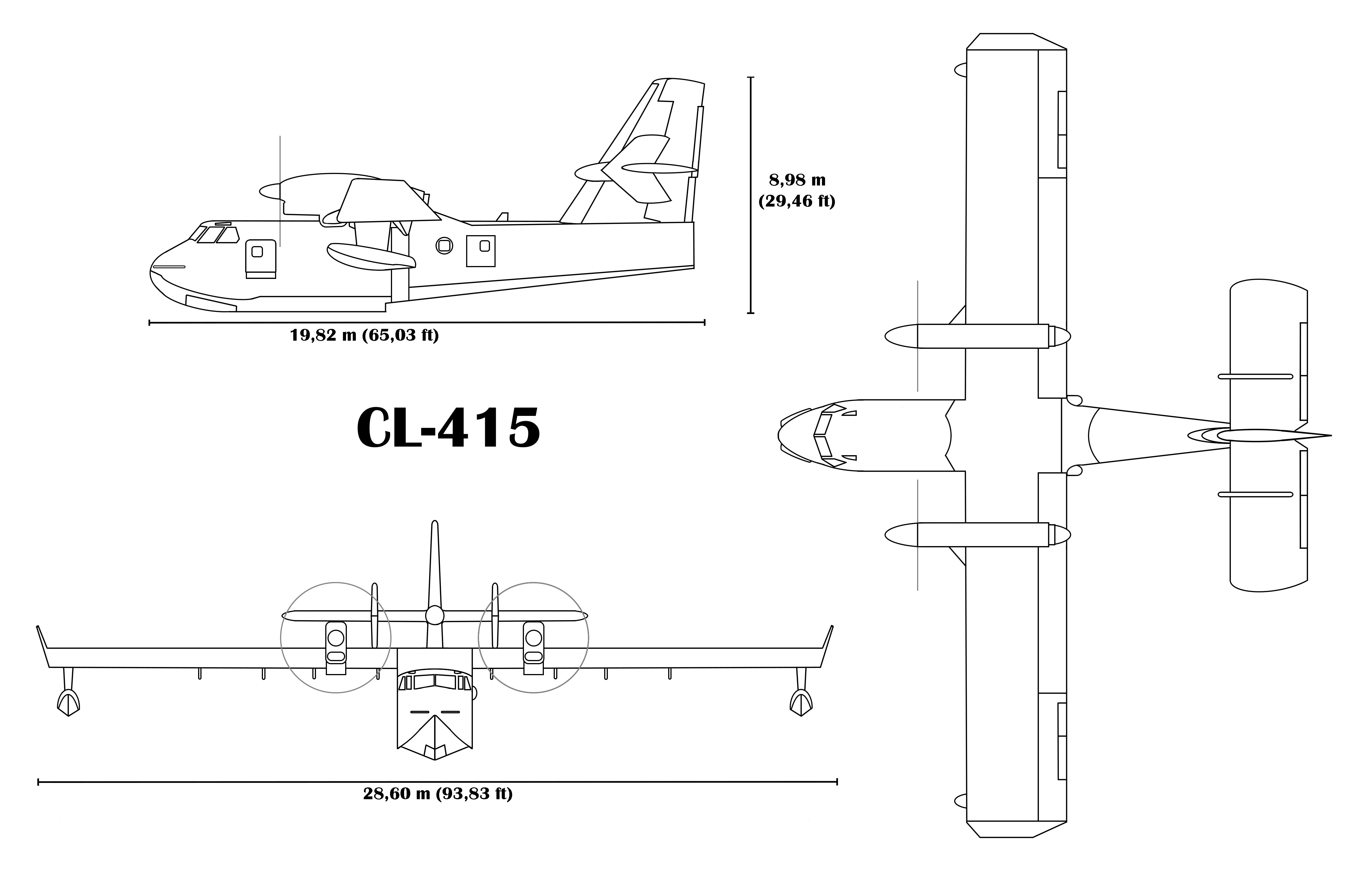
Three-view diagram

Data from Viking

General characteristics

- Crew: 2
- Capacity: 6,137 L (1,350 imp gal; 1,621 US gal) (waterbombing), up to 18 paratroops, up to 2,903 kg (6,400 lb) of cargo
- Length: 20.4 m (66 ft 11 in)
- Wingspan: 28.38 m (93.11 ft)
- Height: 9.01 m (29.55 ft)
- Wing area: 100 m^{2} (1,080 sq ft)
- Aspect ratio: 8.03
- Empty weight: 13,608 kg (30,000 lb)
- Gross weight: 21,319 kg (47,000 lb) Maximum After-scooping Weight
- Max takeoff weight: 19,890 kg (43,850 lb) Firefighting, Land
- Fuel capacity: 4,650 kg (10,250 lb) 5812 L ( 1535 US Gal; 1278 imp Gal)
- Cabin volume: 35.6 m^{3} (1,260 cu ft)
- Powerplant: 2 × Pratt & Whitney Canada PW123AF turboprop, 1,775 kW (2,380 hp) each ISA+20 °C Flat rated
- Propellers: 4-bladed Hamilton Sundstrand 14SF-19, 3.97 m (13 ft 0 in) diameter Fully reversible, feathering blades

Performance

- Maximum speed: 359 km/h (223 mph, 194 kn) Max Cruise
- Cruise speed: 333 km/h (207 mph, 180 kn) Normal Cruise
- Stall speed: 126 km/h (78 mph, 68 kn) MLW, Landing Configuration
- Ferry range: 2,427 km (1,508 mi, 1,310 nmi) 278 km/h (150 kn) Long Range Cruise
- Endurance: 3 hours at 200 nmi (370 km) from base
- g limits: +3.25−1.0 g
- Rate of climb: 5.9 m/s (1,170 ft/min) (ISA, MTOW)
- Wing loading: 212.5 kg/m^{2} (43.52 lb/sq ft) Maximum After-scooping
- Takeoff (ISA): 783 m (2,569 ft) (land), 814 m (2,671 ft) (water)
- Landing (ISA): 674 m (2,211 ft) (land), 665 m (2,182 ft) (water)

Avionics

- Honeywell EDZ-605 (CL-415)
- Rockwell Collins Pro Line Fusion (CL-415EAF, older CL-415 AUP)
- Universal InSight (newer CL-415 AUP, DHC-515)

== See also ==
Related development

- Canadair CL-215

Aircraft of comparable role, configuration, and era

- Beriev Be-12
- Beriev Be-200
- Harbin PS-5
- ShinMaywa US-2
