= Bridger Aerospace =

American company providing aerial firefighting services

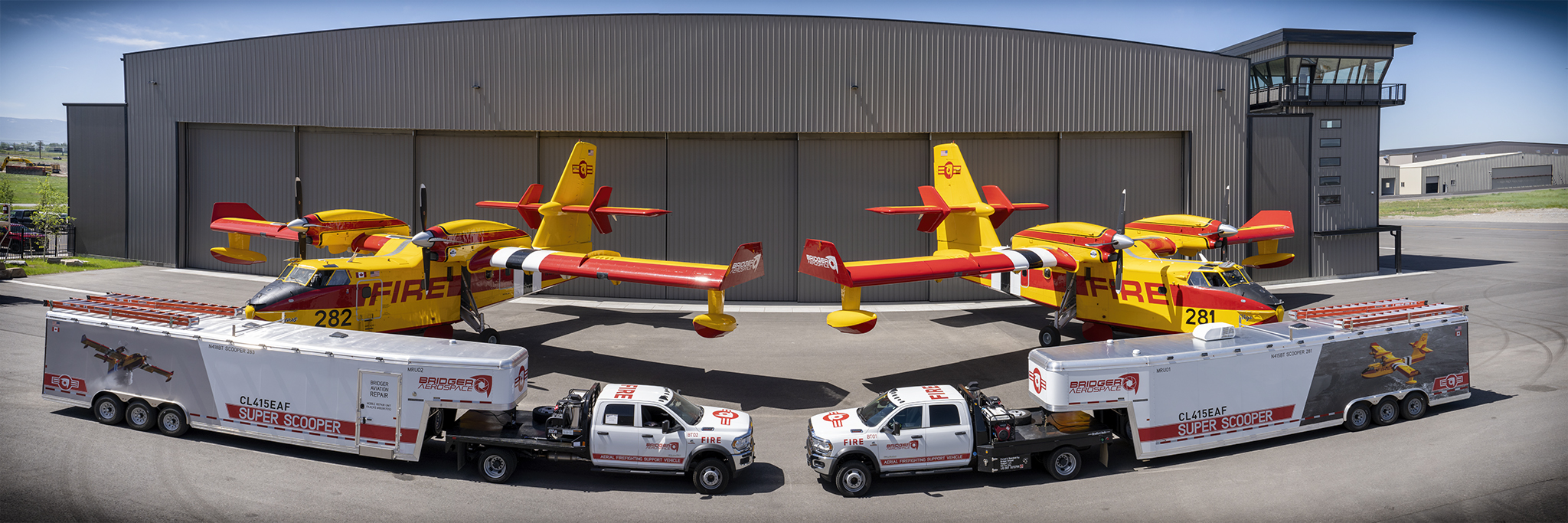
- Type: Public
- Traded as: Nasdaq: BAER
- Industry: Aerospace
- Founded: 2014
- Founder: Tim Sheehy
- Headquarters: Belgrade, Montana, United States
- Key people: Sam Davis (CEO); Adolphus “Bill” Andrews (COO); Anne Hayes (CFO)
- Revenue: ▲US$123 million (2025)
- Net income: ▲US$4.14 million (2025)
- Website: Official website

Bridger Aerospace is an American aerospace company that provides aerial firefighting and wildfire management services. It has supported firefighting efforts in 24 U.S. states and two Canadian provinces. Founded in 2014, it is publicly traded on the NASDAQ and as of 2026 owns the largest private Super Scooper fleet in the world.

== History ==
Bridger Aerospace was founded in Montana is 2014 by former Navy Seal Tim Sheehy. It was initially operated with one plane that assisted ranchers with tracking cattle from the air. During the 2015 wildfire season, the company shifted its focus to aerial firefighting. Its first contract was in 2015 with the U.S. Forest Service where it provided air attack work incorporating sensor and infrared technology.

By 2018, Bridger was using unmanned aircraft systems for firefighting activities and was one of four companies awarded a contract with the United States Department of the Interior to use drones in emergency situations, including during wildfires. The same year it became the first private company to legally use drones for wildfire fighting during the Martin Fire in Nevada, mapping 435,000 acres of burned land in 11 flight runs. By August 2019 the company had grown to a fleet of 20 aircraft and a staff of 100.

Bridger added fire suppression and initial attack capabilities in 2020 with the receipt of two De Havilland CL-415EAF Firefighting Aircraft. The company was the launch customer for the aircraft after convincing DeHavilland of Canada to begin production on such aircraft after a 10 year dormancy. During the COVID-19 pandemic, the company offered its fleet to healthcare workers for moving supplies and patients. The company also manufactured face shields that it donated to frontline workers and used its fleet to deliver other personal protection equipment to medical personnel throughout Montana.

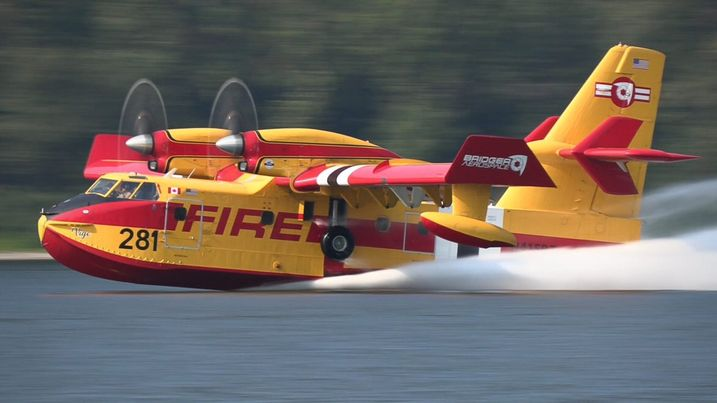
Bridger Aerospace Super Scooper fighting the 2022 Cedar Creek Fire.

In January 2023, Bridger merged with Jack Creek and went public via SPAC merger at a valuation of $869 million. By 2025, its services were used in various states, including helping fight the 2025 California wildfires. It also secured a $20 million contract with the United States Department of the Interior for surveillance aircraft to assist the Bureau of Land Management Alaska Fire Service. It secured an additional contract with the United States Department of the Interior in 2026.

In January 2026, Bridger acquired additional firefighting and air attack aircraft to expand its operational fleet. The purchases included two Canadair CL-215T amphibious firefighting aircraft, acquired for approximately $50 million, following the earlier acquisition of four air attack aircraft in late 2025. As of 2026, it owns the largest private Super Scooper fleet in the world.

== Operations ==
The company is headquartered in Belgrade, Montana and provides aerial firefighting services to government agencies, including the United States Forest Service, across the U.S. Its planes are used for fire suppression and it uses unmanned aerial vehicles to map and provide surveillance of fires. The drones provide fire crews with information including infrared imagery of active fires, and support communication with and tracking of firefighters on the ground. The company has supported firefighting efforts in 24 U.S. states and two Canadian provinces.

== Fleet ==
As of 2021, the company's fleet includes over 20 aircraft, including:

Aircraft	No. of aircraft	Variants	Notes
AC500 Shrike Commander	1	S	Twin Engine Piston
AC690 Turbine Commander	5	A, B, C	Twin Engine Turbine
AC681 Turbine Commander	1	A	Twin Engine Turbine
K100 Daher Kodiak	4	S	Single Engine Turbine
Pilatus PC-12	3	PC-12	Single Engine Turbine
de Havilland Canada DHC-6 Twin Otter	1	Series 300	Twin Engine Turbine with Floats
FVR90	2		Beyond Line of Sight (BLOS) Unmanned Aerial System (UAS)
Canadair CL-415	6	CL-415EAF	EAF "Enhanced Aerial Firefighter" configuration
