= Master of the Beffi Triptych =

Italian painter

The Master of the Beffi Triptych (active circa 1390 -1425) is an unknown Italian painter of the early 15th century in the region of Abruzzo.

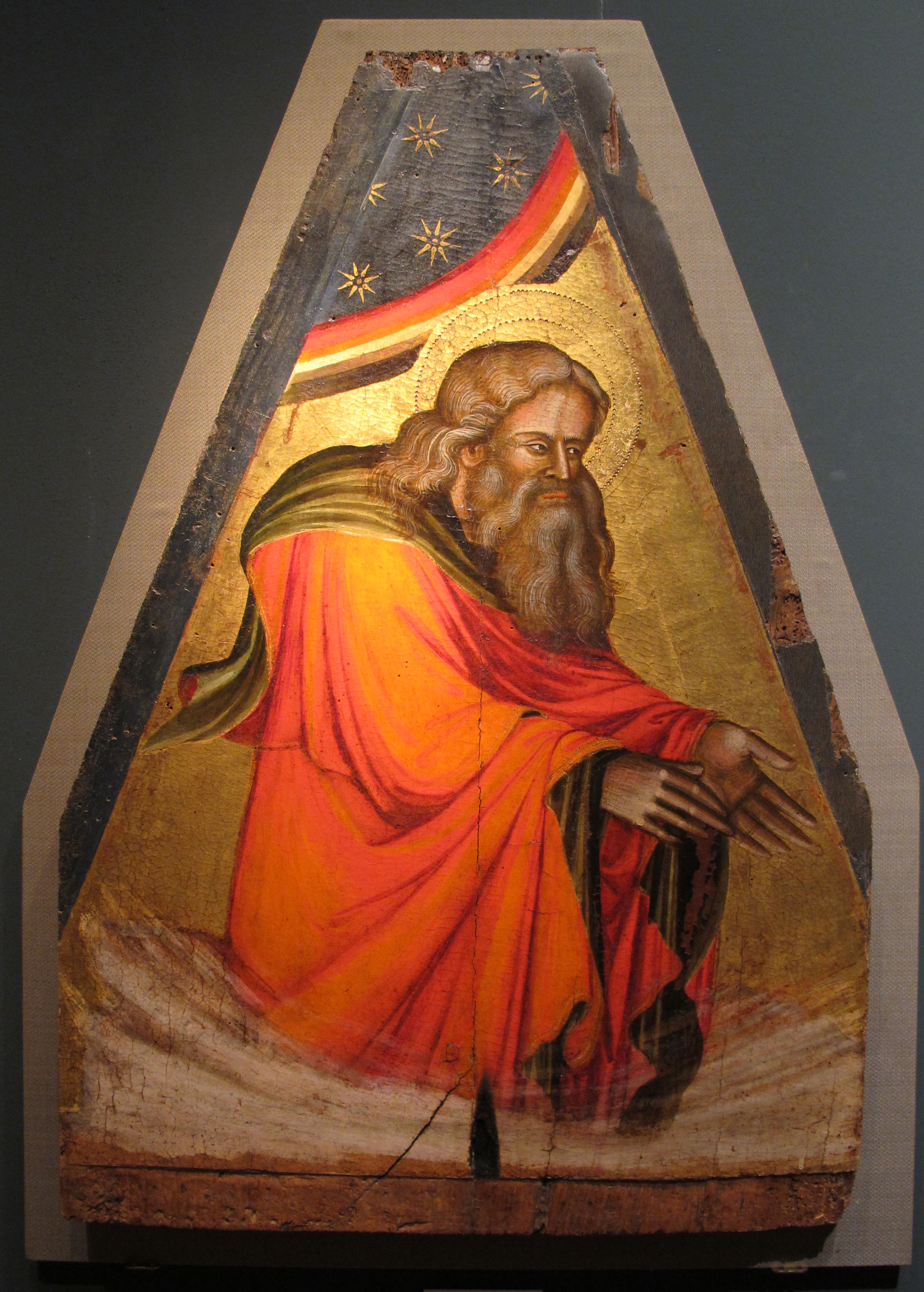
God the Father (circa 1420, Sulmona) attributed to Master of Beffi.

The main work of the artists is a three part wooden panel derived from the church of Santa Maria del Ponte in the town of Beffi, now a frazione of Acciano. The central panel depicts an Enthroned Madonna and Child, while the right panel depicts a Nativity with donor and the left panel depicts an Assumption and Heavenly Coronation of the Virgin.

There is speculation about the identity of the painter. He appears to have been influenced by the style of the Sienese painter Taddeo di Bartolo (1362–1422). In addition to panel paintings, this anonymous painter also illuminated manuscripts and created frescoes in the region. He is identified as the painter of the vault and the walls of the presbytery of the Church of San Silvestro in L'Aquila in the early 1400s.

After the earthquake destroyed the National Museum of Abruzzo in the city of L'Aquila, The Beffi Triptych was loaned in 2010 to the Getty Museum in California.
