= Acciano =

- Comune
- Comune di Acciano
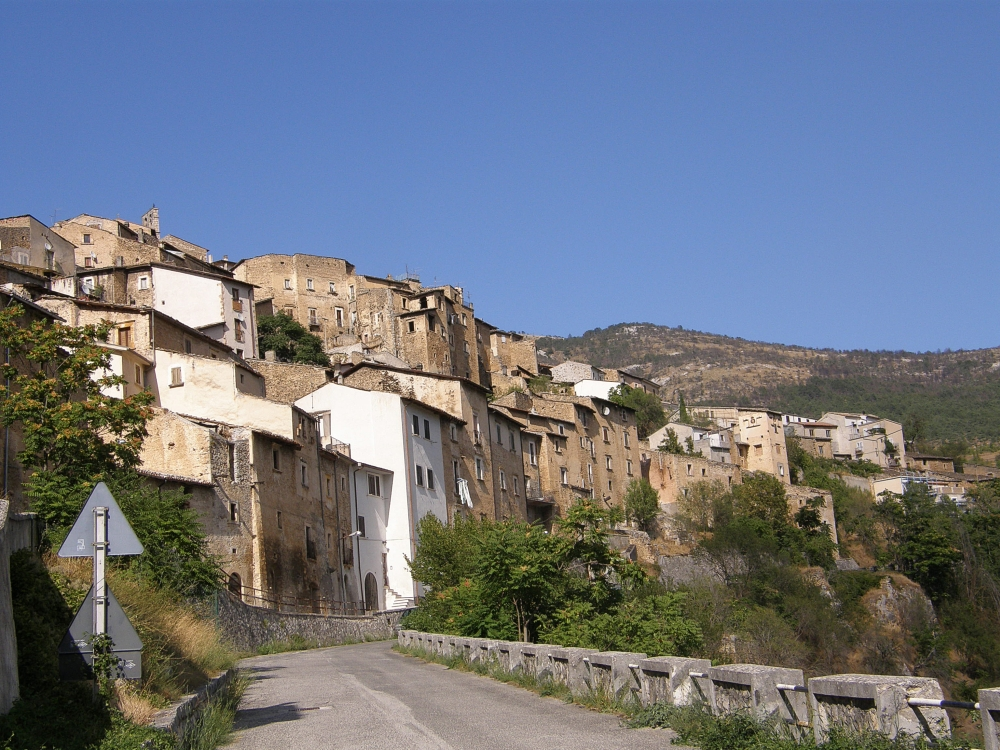
- Panorama of Acciano

- Location of Acciano in Italy Acciano (Abruzzo)
- Coordinates: 42°11′N 13°44′E
- Country: Italy
- Region: Abruzzo
- Province: Province of L'Aquila (AQ)
- Frazioni: Beffi, Roccapreturo, Succiano, San Lorenzo

Area
  - Total: 32 km^{2} (12 sq mi)
- Elevation: 600 m (2,000 ft)

Population (2013)
  - Total: 337
  - Density: 11/km^{2} (27/sq mi)
- Demonym: Accianesi
- Time zone: UTC+1 (CET)
  - Summer (DST): UTC+2 (CEST)
- Postal code: 67020
- Dialing code: 0864
- Patron saint: Santa Petronilla
- Saint day: 31 May
- Website: Official website

Acciano is a comune in the Province of L'Aquila in the Abruzzo region of Italy. The small, medieval village is in the Subequana valley and is a part of the Sirentina Mountain Community.

This village is well known in Italy for its quality productions of Montepulciano red wines.

== History ==
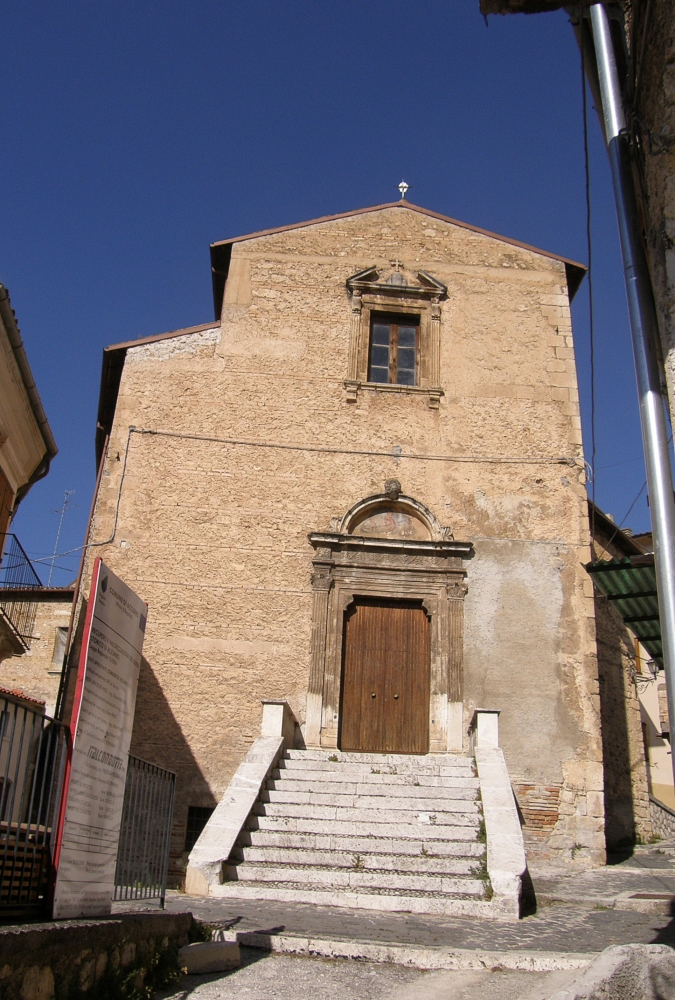
Church of St Peter and Paul

Many monuments of great artistic significance are present in the area including the discovery of a square structure of an ancient Italic-Roman temple as well as numerous pottery fragments scattered around it. The structure is located between the church of Santa Maria delle Grazie and the cemetery in the S. Lorenzo. The test, run by the Archaeological Superintendence of Chieti, dated the relics to between the Republican and the first imperial age of the Roman Empire. Renowned Italian archaeologist Giuseppe Fiorelli discovered old burial tombs and fragments of bucchero vases around the Church of San Lorenzo. The discovery by Antonio De Nino in contrada Vicenna of shrouds and an elaborate system of tunnels with evident traces of a mosaic floor near the ancient cemetery is enough evidence to testify that there was an ancient town located at Acciano (for lack of funds now, these excavations have been covered by soil until they can be best appreciated).

Various aristocratic families in Italy and Spain, such as the feuding Piccolomini and Scialenghi Strozzi families, rotated possession of the village. The presence of walls, towers (now destroyed) and doors bear witness to Acciano's strategic importance as the connection between the Adriatic and Rome, an importance it would bear for centuries.

== Etymology ==
The name Acciano (Hacciànë) was stabilized in 1028 as Accio. The name comes from the Roman noble, Accius, meaning "family farm Acció". Today the town of Acciano is made up of capital and the fractions of Beffi, Succiano, Roccapreturo and San Lorenzo. Onciari in land and fires counts made between the 15th-16th centuries were called respectively: Castrum Acciani, Villa Socciani, Castrum Beffi, Rocca Preturo and Villa de Sancti Laurentii. Knowing what the study of place names, the historical reconstruction aid, we will give briefly the meaning and origin of the names of local villages and town. Castrum Castrum Beffa Acciani and the first part of the name refers to the Roman castrum, castellum then, and even fortified citadel, bastion. Villa and Villa Sancti Socciani Laurentii: the first part of the name derives from the Latin villa, originally a country house, farm to farm and small settlement, then almost synonymous with country. Rocca de Preturo: Rocca - rock - and later the fortress on top of a mountain, town, born in the Abruzzo region voice from the 12th century.

== Geography ==
Surrounded by green woods of oak, Acciano is perched on a spur of rock between the mountains and stones Bufame Fitte which offers views of the rocky ridges of Sirente.

The steep slopes that surround the village frame the valley in which flows the river Aterno.

The territory of the municipality varies in elevation from 450 to 1,303 metres (1,476 to 4,275 ft) above sea level, a range of 853 metres (2,799 ft).

The distance from the capital, L'Aquila, is about 35 kilometres (22 mi) along the road "Valley Subequana". Sulmona is about 37 kilometres (23 mi) away.

== Fortified town of Acciano ==
The small country of some Longobard still fortified houses of medieval origin. The historic center of Acciano, enclosed within the walls still exist, denotes the condition of a fortified village where access was gained through three doors: Porta Torrone, Porta Martino, and Porta of Aia. The topography of the land affected in its pre-eminent urban typology which lies on steep slopes to the left of the river Aterno. The history of the village is from the 14th century, when the arrangement of the walls, to the 16th century, given the reconstruction or rehabilitation of several buildings.

== Monuments ==
Church of SS Peter and Lourence; Church of S. Petronilla; Church of S. Anthony from Padua; Tower of Beffi; Tower of Roccapreturo; Renaissance Fountain.

== Transport ==
Acciano has a stop on the Terni–Sulmona railway, with trains to L'Aquila and Sulmona.

== See also ==
- Abruzzo (wine)
- Master of the Beffi Triptych
