= Canadair CL-215 =

Flying boat family by Canadair, later Bombardier

CL-215
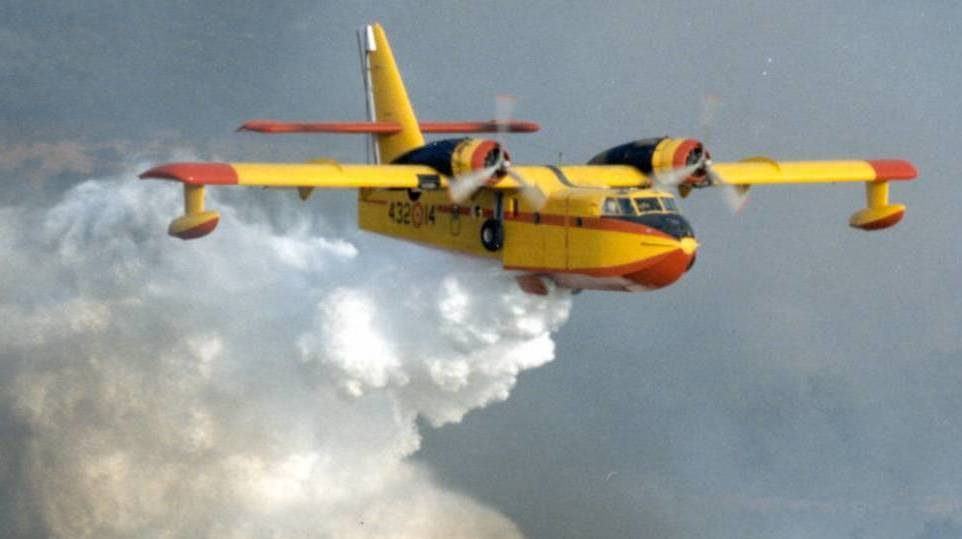

General information
- Role: Firefighting amphibious aircraft
- National origin: Canada
- Manufacturer: Canadair
- Status: In service
- Primary users: Canada Greece; Spain; United States
- Number built: 125

History
- Manufactured: 1969–1990
- Introduction date: 1969
- First flight: 23 October 1967
- In service: 1969–present
- Variant: Canadair CL-415

The Canadair CL-215 Scooper is the first model in a series of amphibious flying boats designed and built by Canadian aircraft manufacturer Canadair, and later produced by Bombardier. It is one of only a handful of large amphibious aircraft to have been produced in large numbers during the post-war era, and the first to be developed from the outset as a water bomber.

The CL-215 is a twin-engine, high-wing aircraft designed in the 1960s. From an early stage, it was developed to perform aerial firefighting operations as a water bomber; to operate well in such a capacity, it can be flown at relatively low speeds and in high gust-loading environments, as are typically found over forest fires. It can also be used for other missions types, including passenger services, freight transport, and air-sea search and rescue operations. On 23 October 1967, the first prototype c/n 1001 performed its maiden flight, and the first production aircraft was handed over during June 1969.

While production of the CL-215 was terminated during 1990, this was due to the imminent introduction of an improved variant of the aircraft, which was designated as the CL-415, the manufacture of which commenced during 1993. Furthermore, numerous conversion and improvement programmes have been developed for existing aircraft, such as the CL-215T, a turbine-powered model of the original aircraft which replaces the original Pratt & Whitney R-2800-83AM radial engines with a pair of Pratt & Whitney Canada PW123AF turbine engines. Other changes include the addition of new avionics and various structural improvements.

== Development ==
=== Origins ===
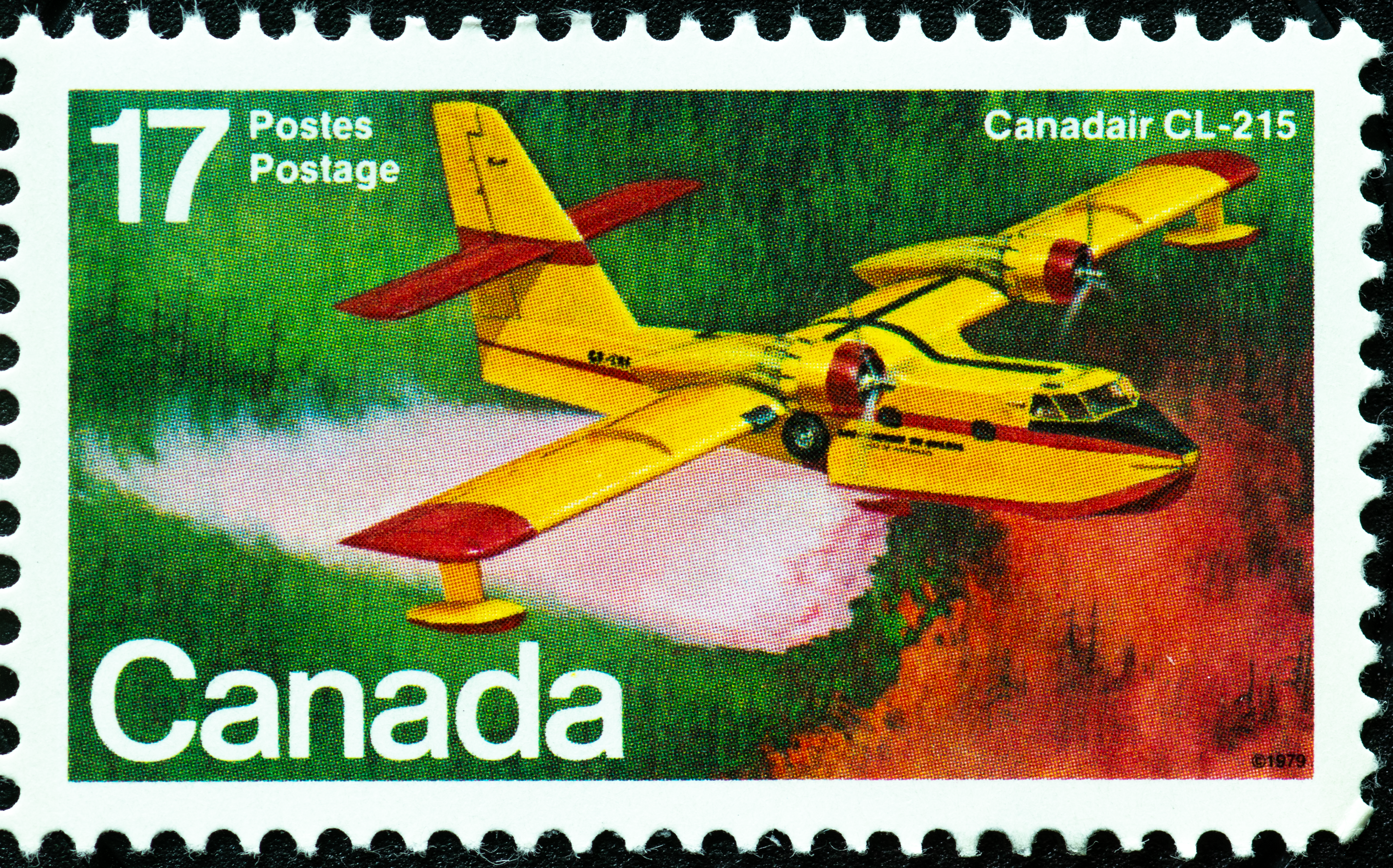
1979 postage stamp of a CL-215

The origins of the CL-215 can be traced back to two earlier project studies conducted by Canadian aircraft manufacturer Canadair, the CL-43 and CL-204. The CL-43 was conceived as a logistics aircraft and was based on the design of the Canadian Vickers-built 369 Canso (which was itself a variant of the Consolidated PBY Catalina). Arising from an earlier 1960s research study at the company, the original concept was for a twin-engined floatplane transport, that was altered into a "firefighter" as a result of a request by forestry officials in the Quebec Service Aérien (Quebec Government Air Service) for a more effective way of delivering water to forest fires. The 1962 preliminary design, designated as the CL-204, was a purpose-designed water bomber that evolved into an amphibian flying boat configuration, powered by two shoulder-mounted 2,100 hp (1,566 kW) Pratt & Whitney R-2800 piston engines. Reportedly, in excess of 1,700 hours of wind tunnel and water tank testing was used to help define the aircraft's basic configuration. This design was shaped by a desire for it to be well-suited for performing a range of roles, including air-sea search and rescue, cargo haulage and commercial passenger-carrying, beyond the water bomber mission.

The definitive design, which was designated as the CL-215, was publicly revealed at the 1965 Paris Air Show. Aviation publication Flight International observed that the CL-215 was "one of the very few entirely new large marine aircraft to be put in hand for some 20 years", and that it was the first aircraft to be designed to perform water bombing missions as a primary role. Developing a newer aircraft meant that, unlike its older competitors, the latest techniques to stave off corrosion could be applied, as well as a fail-safe structure, to give the aircraft a lengthy lifespan. Canadair's market research indicated that there were many aging seaplanes for which operators required a modern replacement.

On 1 February 1966, the programme was authorised to proceed. On 23 October 1967, the first prototype performed its maiden flight. By November 1968, Canadair had decided to commit to an initial production batch of 30 aircraft. During June 1969, the first CL-215 was delivered to the French civil protection agency (Sécurité Civile, then known as Protection Civile). The aircraft, which was one of a batch of ten, had been purchased under a £4 million arrangement; by July 1970, the order had been completed, along with a third of a 15 aircraft order from the government of Quebec. Quebec had ordered the type as a replacement for their aging fleet of Canso water bombers; in comparison to the Canso, the CL-215 required a shorter landing distance and was capable of travelling twice as fast.

=== Further development ===
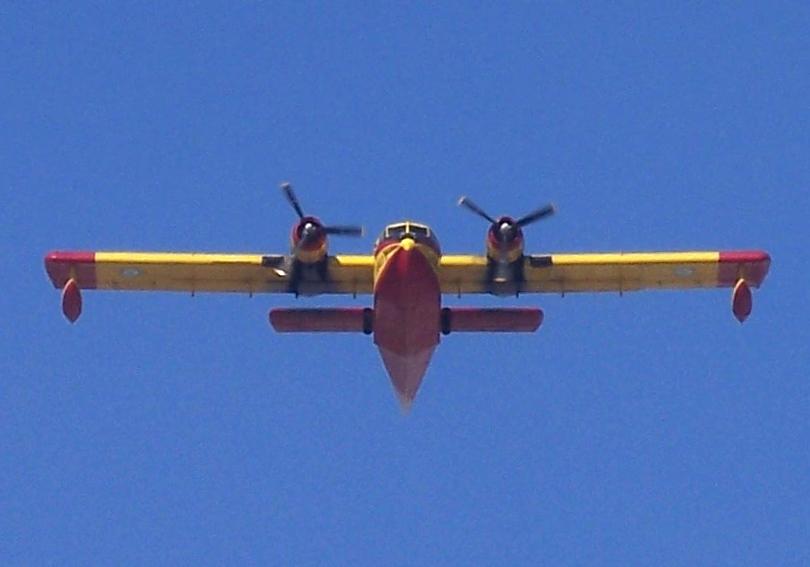
Head-on view of a Hellenic Air Force CL-215, 2007

Prior to the delivery of the first aircraft, plans had already been mooted for the production of multiple models of the type. While the CL-215A served as the standard water bomber configuration, another model, designated as the CL-215C, had been envisioned to dispense with the design compromises as to better perform the water bomber mission, allowing it be furnished with larger doors on the sides of the fuselage and a revised underfloor hull structure.

Production of the CL-215 progressed through five series. Perhaps the most significant development of the type occurred during the 1980s in the form of the CL-215T, an initiative to replace the original Pratt & Whitney R-2800-83AM radial engines with a pair of Pratt & Whitney Canada PW123AF turbine engines. Speaking during the new model's development, company officials recognised that market demand for the CL-215T was marginal, and thus not enough to justify developing an all-new aircraft.

Canadian transport conglomerate Bombardier Aerospace (who had acquired Canadair during the 1980s) decided to terminate production of the type during the late 1980s. Although manufacturing did come to an end in 1990, a further improved model, designated as the CL-415, entered production during 1993. Additionally, multiple conversion and refit programmes have been launched over the following decades to renovate and improve existing aircraft, typically focused on improving aspects such as the engines, avionics and structure.

In 2018 Bombardier sold the design documents and intellectual property rights to the CL-215 and CL-415 to Viking Air. Viking Air had previously purchased the rights to the Twin Otter, and had subsequently opened a production line to manufacture new Twin Otter airframes. Viking announced plans to open a production line to build the CL-515, an improvement over the CL-415, with more recent avionics, instrumentation to allow it to continue fighting fires at night, and the ability to fill other roles, like maritime surveillance, and maritime search and rescue, when it wasn't fire season.

Viking also produced an upgrade kit, the CL-415EAF, which would allow the owners of remaining CL-215 planes to upgrade their engines and avionics to the same level as new CL-515 planes. After being upgraded by Viking Air subsidiaries Longview Aviation Services (LAS) and Cascade Aerospace, the CL-415EAF was first flown from Abbotsford, British Columbia on 12 March 2020, to be delivered in April to Bridger Aerospace.

== Design ==
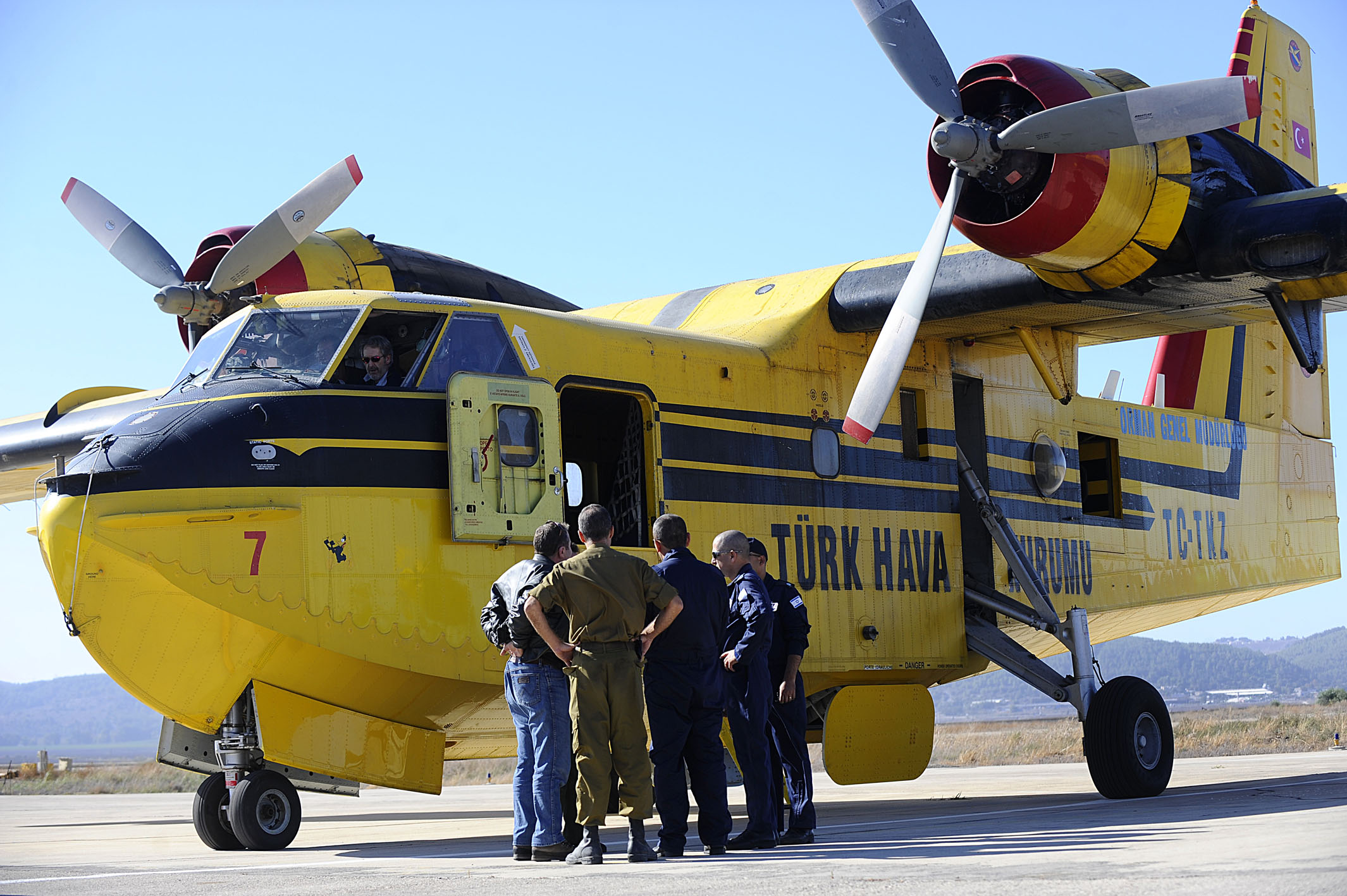
A Canadair CL-215 of Turkish Aeronautical Association TC-TKZ on the ground; note the deployed undercarriage.

The Canadair CL-215 is a twin-engine, high-wing general-purpose amphibious aircraft. It features an atypically spacious fuselage for an amphibian, which is designed to accommodate for the operational needs of various roles that the aircraft was developed to perform. The CL-215 can be used as an airborne firefighting platform, in which capacity it is used as a water bomber; it has been claimed to be the first aircraft designed to withstand the severe aerodynamic and hydrodynamic loads imposed by such usage. Beyond the water bomber role, the CL-215 was designed for use in other capacities, such as a search and rescue platform, passenger transport, and freighter; for this purpose, the cabin can be configured in various different ways, including a flexible combi configuration. Under typical operations, these applications would harness the aircraft's ability to land and takeoff from the water, the hull having been designed to enable its use upon the open seas.

The CL-215 was designed to perform well in the aerial firefighter role. The apparatus is designed around previously-proven concepts and careful design. The aircraft's belly houses a pair of 1,400 litres (300 imp gal) water tanks of which large downward-facing doors forms their bottoms; these open to rapidly discharge water over a target area. These doors are normally hydraulically actuated and electrically controlled, but a manual release is present for emergency use only; the tanks can be emptied simultaneously, individually, or in sequence at the pilot's selection. Both tanks are positioned directly upon the aircraft's centre of gravity so that filling or emptying the tanks has minimal impact upon the aircraft's flying characteristics. Water can be rapidly drawn into these water tanks while the aircraft is moving across a body of water's surface via purpose-built rotatable aluminium scoops; if a collision occurs, these scoops have been designed to break away from the aircraft without damaging the fuselage. To prevent the tanks from becoming overfilled, overflow ducts are present at the top of the tanks, which discharge excess water via the sides of the fuselage.

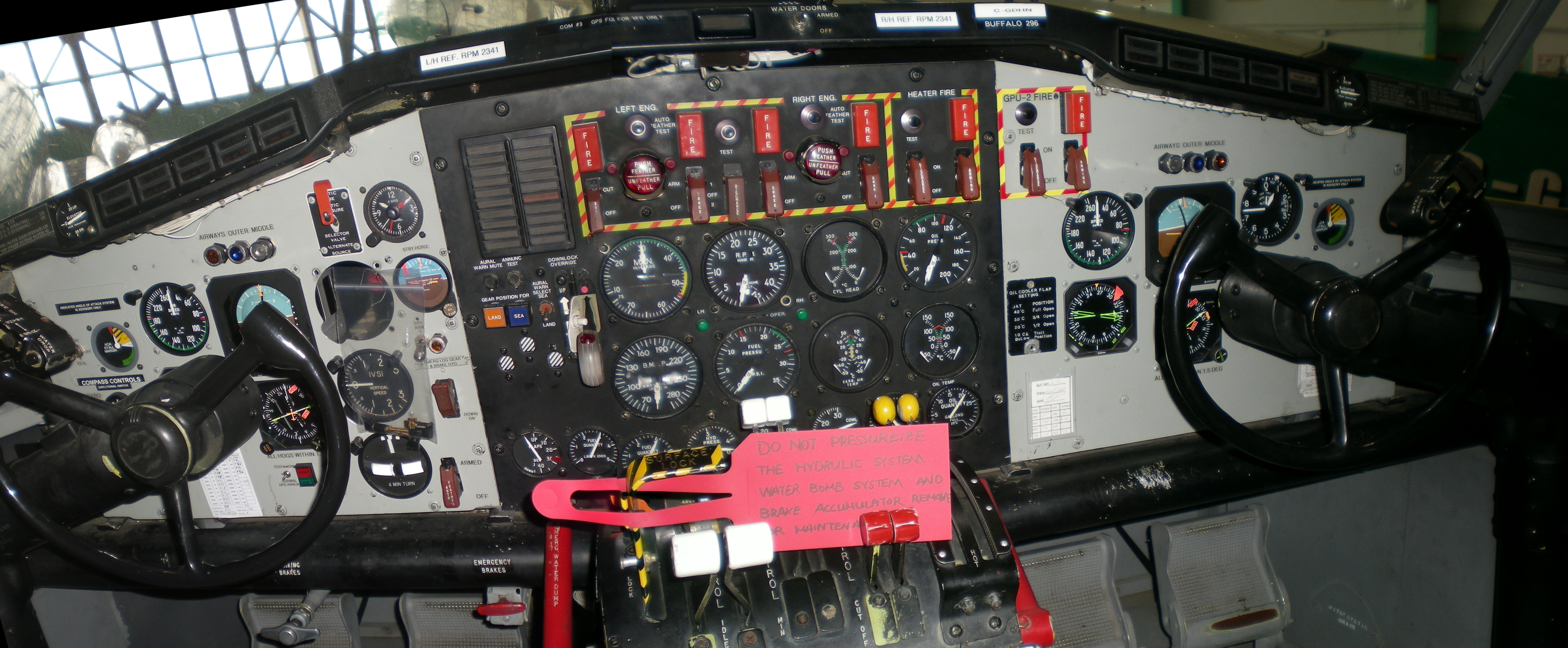
The cockpit of a Buffalo Airways CL-215, September 2010

The CL-215 is said to handle well in both the skies and upon the water; significant attention was paid in its design to attaining a high level of manoeuvrability while at low speeds. The hull was laid out with considerable forethought, using the full length of the fuselage as a hull to give the aircraft good handling across many sea states. This hull incorporates a high deadrise angle to reduce impact loads exerted during landings, along with a high step to improve breakaway. Sufficient buoyancy is acquired via multiple watertight bulkheads and a sealed floor attaching directly to the hull frames, two of which serve as attachment points for the wings. Spray compresses are present along the hull's chine, directing spray away from the propellers, engines, and tail unit, while a purpose-built plate diverts spray from the pilot's windshield. The CL-215 is relatively conventional in terms of its aerodynamics; all of the flying controls use traditional surfaces and are manually actuated via mechanical linkages. It is furnished with a high-mounted low-aspect ratio wing, which is equipped with single-slotted flaps. To simplify pilot workload, a constant 15-degree flaps position is used for both low speed and low altitude flight, while the need to adjust the aircraft's trim has been minimised during operations such as water uptake and dropping.

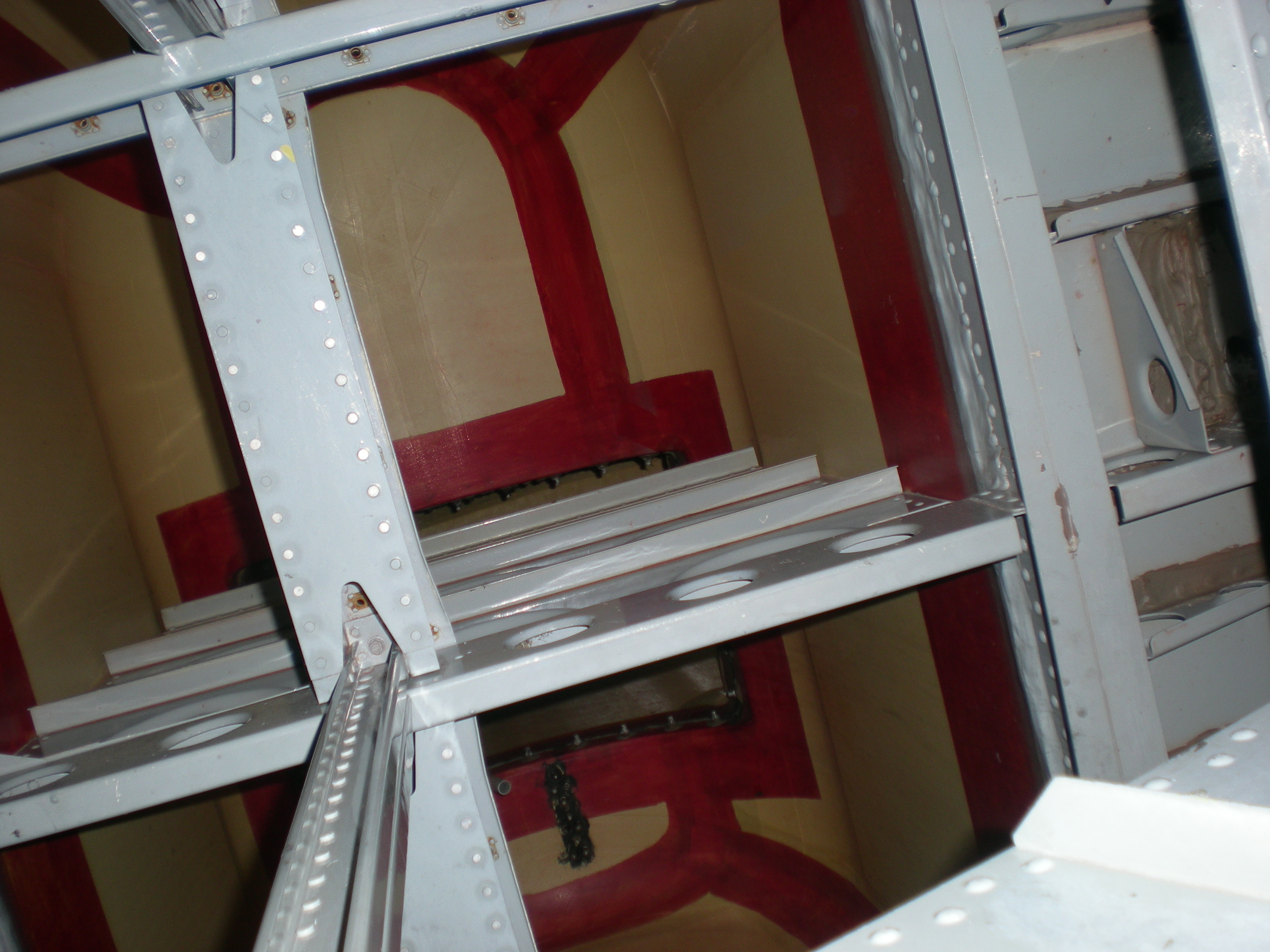
Internal view of the "bomb door" from which water is dropped

Both the structure and systems on board the aircraft were reportedly designed to ease manufacture and maintenance. The primary structure is compliant with fail-safe design principles, as well as with attention paid to minimising built-in residual stresses and maximising protection against corrosion; as such, conventional alloys are used throughout, while numerous materials, including magnesium, are excluded to reduce reactivity. For this purpose, Canadair paid heed to requirements previously defined by the United States Navy under MIL-F-7179, having judged these criteria to be optimal for their purposes. All aluminium components that made direct contact with water were sulphurically anodised and sealed used sodium dichromate; other aluminium elements received a chromate coating before the exterior paint was applied while steel was plated with a cadmium-titanium alloy. Contact between dissimilar metals was avoided wherever reasonable to do so, or otherwise insulated from another by four coats of primer. The exterior paint layer consists of wash primer, followed by a coat of epoxy-polyamide primer, and then a final top coat; some areas may have received a special synthetic rubber-based sealant coating to prevent moisture ingress.

The CL-215 is powered by a pair of 2,200 hp Pratt & Whitney R-2800-83AM radial engines, which was regarded as a proven and reliable power unit. Flight International describes this choice as being unusual as these engines were no longer in production, a decision that was somewhat justified by the large numbers of reconditioned units that were available during the 1960s; it was believed that a piston engine would be more durable in a maritime environment. In a standard configuration, fuel is housed across 12 tanks within the wing, although additional tanks can be installed within the outer wing. Deicing measures protect the engine's carburettors, which involves drawing heated air from the engine cylinders over them instead of ambient air. The propellers can also be fitted with electrical heating mats; while these are provisioned for, they were not fitted as standard. Each engine drives a pump for the hydraulic system, which is used to actuate the engine cowl and wing flaps, the wheel brakes, water drop doors and pick-up probes, as well as for undercarriage retraction; each engine also drives a 28V DC generator which powers the aircraft's electrical systems.

== Operational history ==
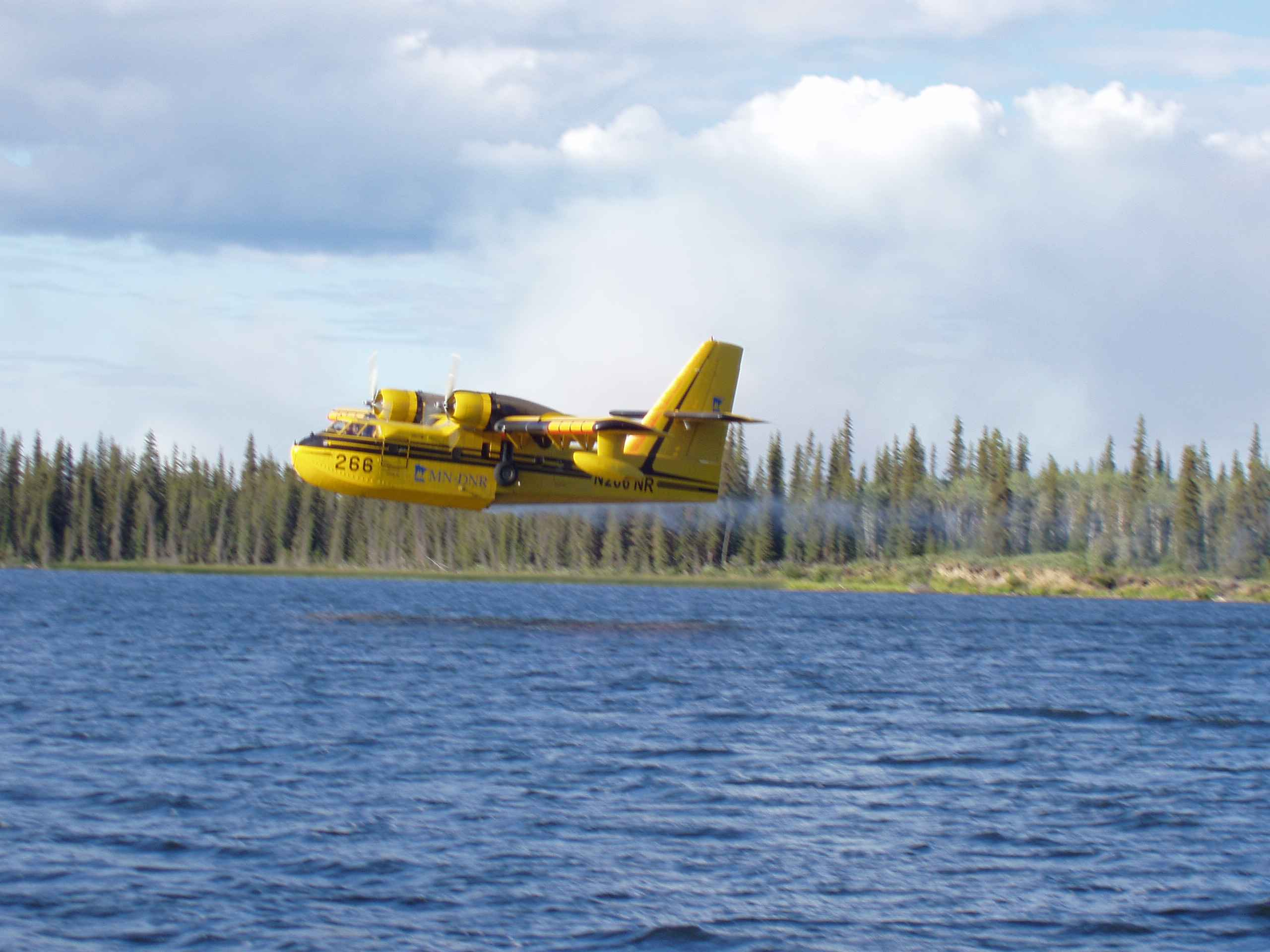
A CL-215 making a low pass above a body of water

Over a period of 21 years beginning in 1969, 125 of these aircraft were built and sold to customers in 11 countries. In 2018, there were reportedly around 165 CL-215 and CL-415s in service across 11 countries.

== Variants ==
CL-215A
Initial version, with Pratt & Whitney R-2800-83AM 18-cylinder air-cooled radial piston engines. Features an internal structure compatible with provisioning water bombing apparatus, which includes a pair of underfloor tanks, belly-mounted doors, and rotating scoops. It was targeted at the water bomber and utility freight market sectors.
CL-215B
Near-identical to the CL-215A, this model featured minor adaptations made to suit the needs of the search and rescue and commercial freight industry customers.
CL-215C
Largely identical to the CL-215A, but lacks any provision for the water bomber mission. As such, it features a revised underfloor structure, larger side-mounted doors and more windows in the main cabin area. A maximum of 36 passenger can be accommodated, without making any provision for baggage.

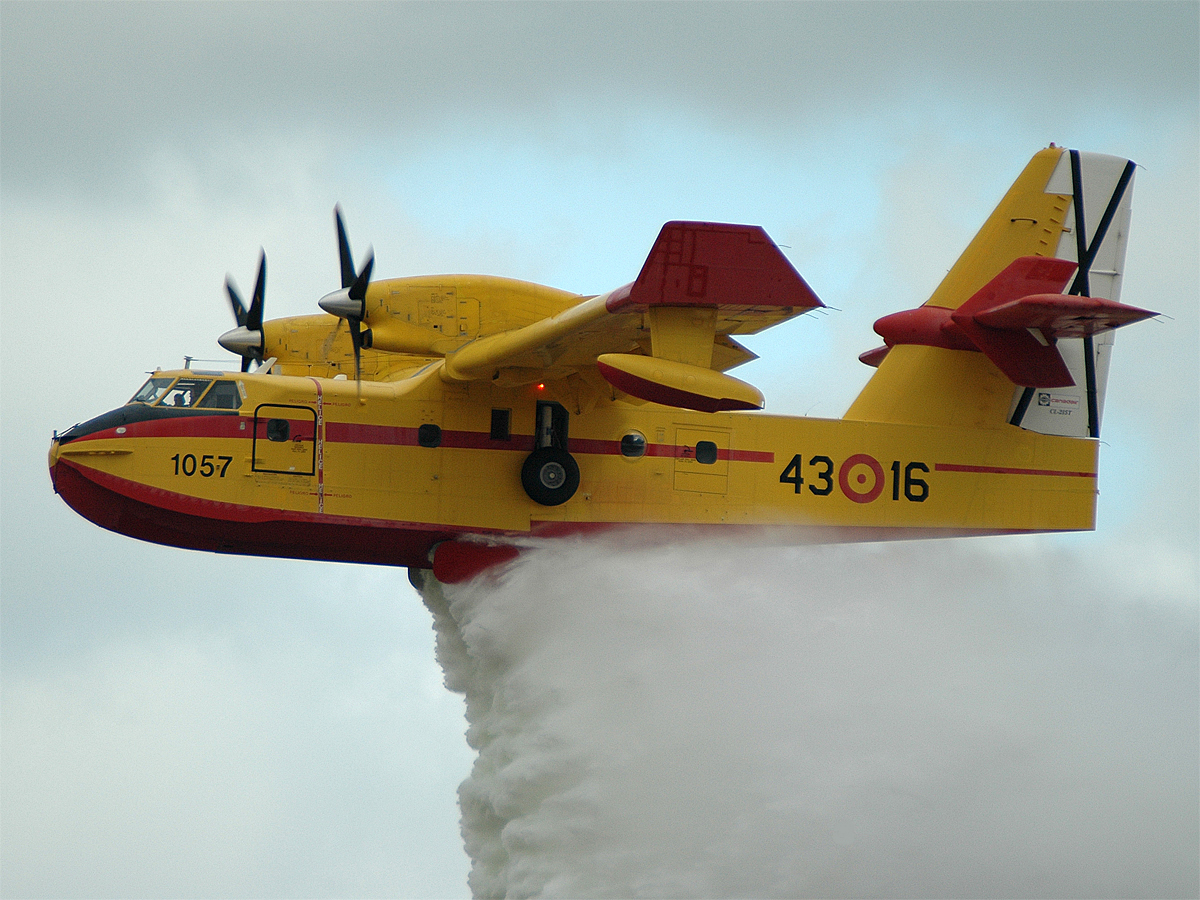
A turboprop-powered CL-215T of the Spanish Air Force

CL-215T

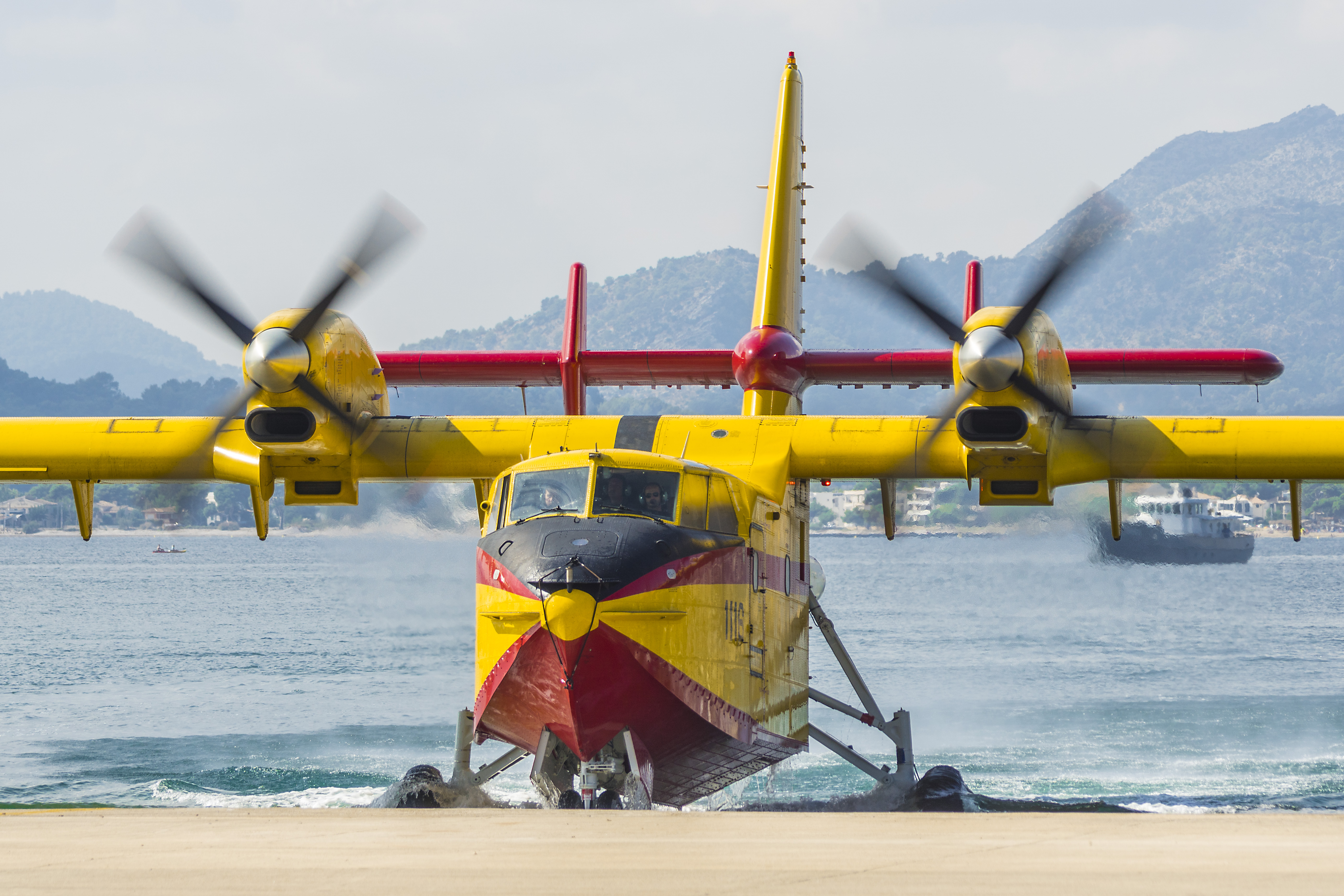
A Spanish Canadair CL-215T exiting the water after a flight at Visita LEPO 2016

In 1987, the CL-215T was announced, with improvements in handling brought about by design changes to the wings and empennage, and more powerful Pratt & Whitney turboprop engines. Originally the follow-up CL-215T was to be a simple turboprop-powered development of the CL-215, and Canadair converted two aircraft in 1989 to act as development aircraft. The first of these flew on 8 June 1989. Retrofit kits for CL-215s to the new standard are offered, but Canadair elected not to build new CL-215Ts and instead developed the CL-415. Cascade Aerospace, Canada, offers CL-215 to CL-215T engine retrofits using the Bombardier kit and Pratt & Whitney Canada PW123AF engines.
CL-415EAF
Conversion program offered by Viking Air featuring Pratt & Whitney turboprop engines and EFIS avionics suite. The first of 11 used aircraft purchased to be modified should be delivered to launch customer, Bridger Aerospace, in the first quarter of 2020. They will be strengthened to raise its maximum takeoff weight and have new flight controls, hydraulic and fuel systems.
CL-515
A relaunched production version, furnished with the CL-415EAF configuration. Viking Aviation has announced plans to hire up to 150 employees to perform those conversions through its dedicated subsidiary, and in May 2018 applied for government support for restarting production of the type.
B.TK.1
(Thai: บ.ธก.๑) Royal Thai Armed Forces designation for the CL-215T.
CL-215GR
Hellenic Air Force designation of upgraded 215A with PW123AF engines

== Operators ==
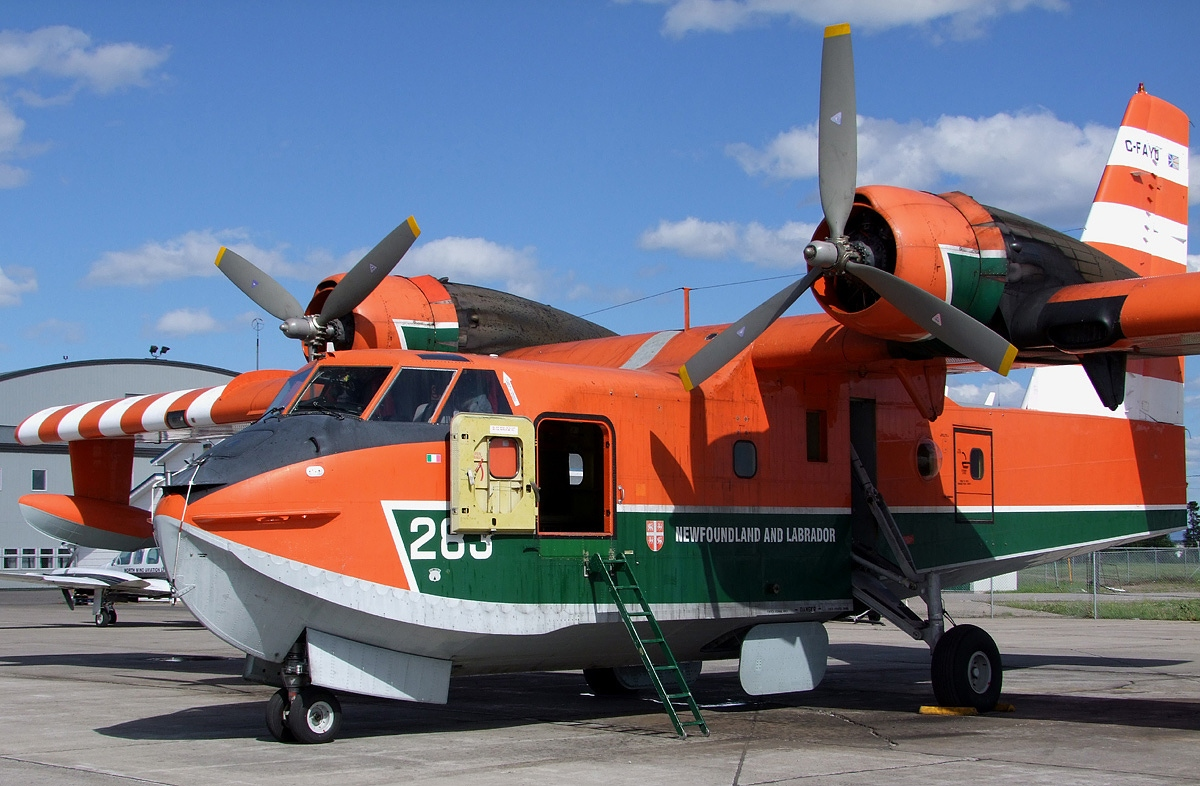
Canadair CL-215 in Canadian civil service (Government of Newfoundland and Labrador)

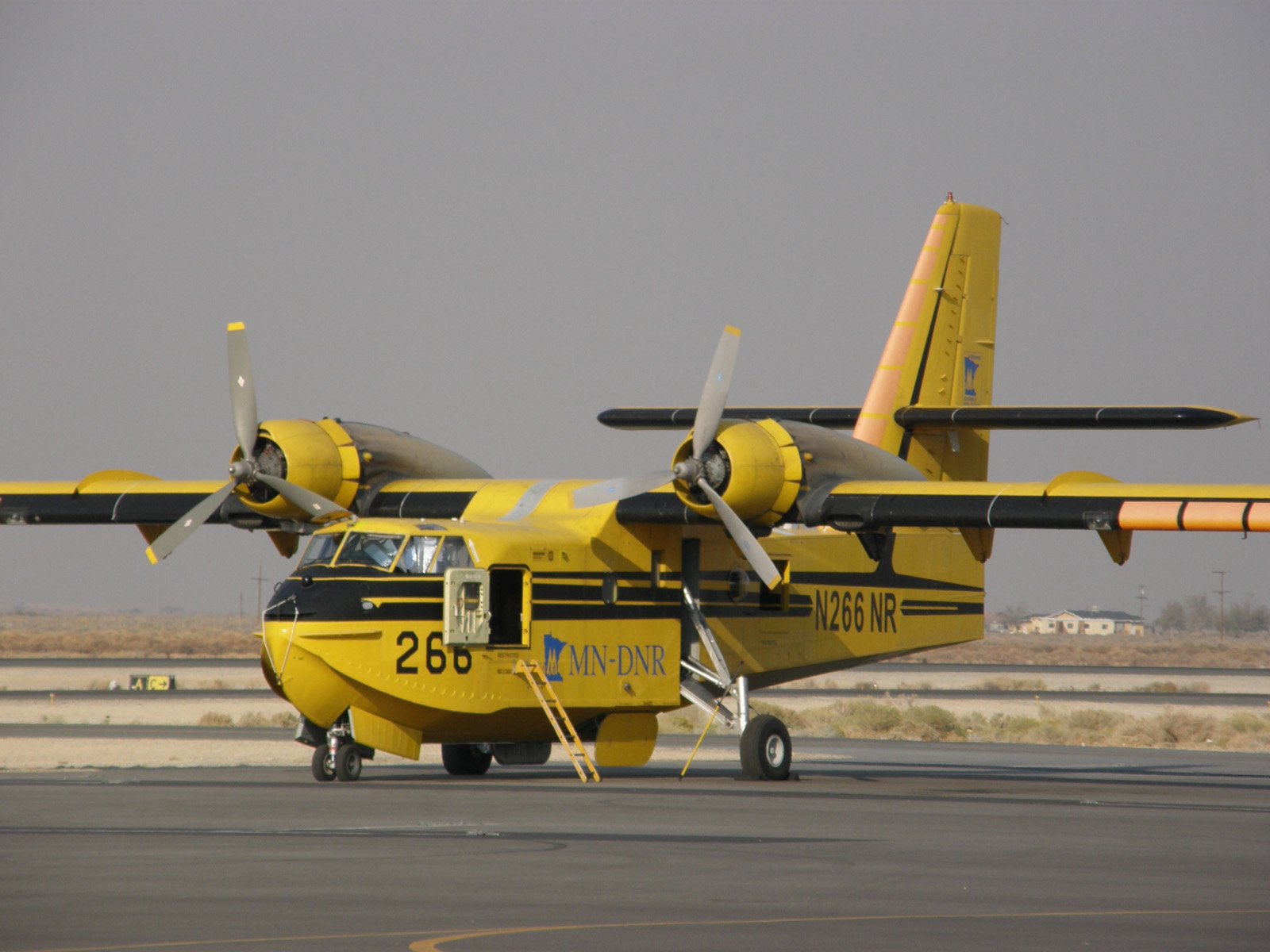
One of Minnesota DNR's Scoopers. The department lent the aircraft to the effort to fight the California wildfires of October 2007, and it is seen here at Fox Field.

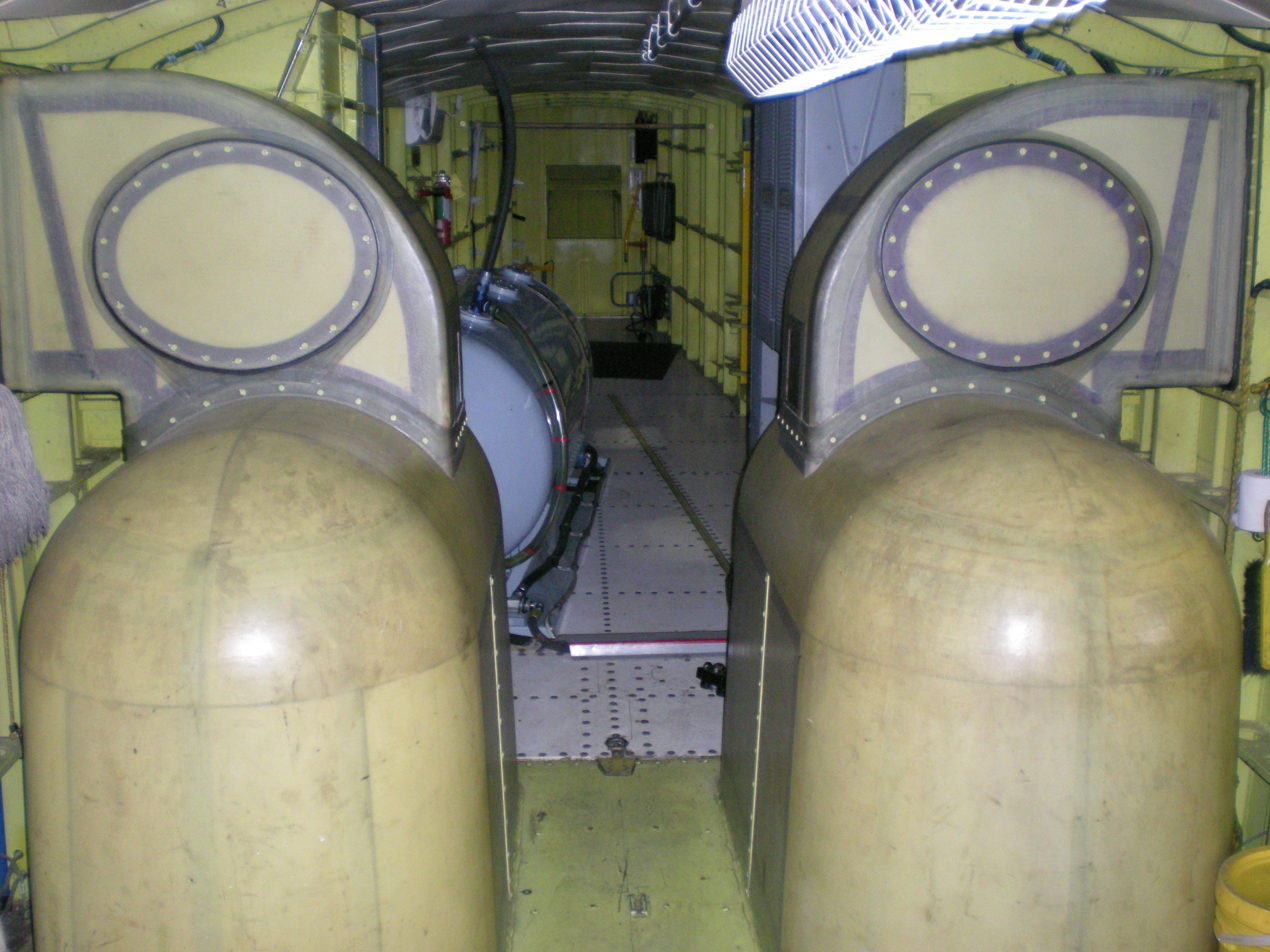
Water tanks with fire suppressant tank at the rear. At the top of the tanks are funnels that allow water to spill overboard if excess is collected during replenishment operations

Canada

As of April 2023 there were 55 CL-215/CL-415 registered with Transport Canada.

- Air Spray, Edmonton, Alberta: seven total; three CL215 1A10 and four CL-215-6B11 (Series CL-415) operated for the Government of Alberta
- Buffalo Airways, Yellowknife, Northwest Territories: four CL215 1A10
- Conair Group, Abbotsford, British Columbia: four CL-215-6B11 (Series CL-215T); former contractor for Alberta
- Government of Newfoundland and Labrador, Newfoundland and Labrador: five CL-215-6B11 (Series CL-415)
- Government of Quebec, Service Aérien Gouvernemental (Transports Québec), Quebec: 14 total; four CL215 1A10, two CL-215-6B11 (Series CL-215T) and eight CL-215-6B11 (Series CL-415)
- Longview Aviation Services Inc., Calgary, Alberta: three CL215 1A10 and two CL-215-6B11 (Series CL-215T)
- Government of Ontario, Ministry of Natural Resources, Ontario: nine CL-215-6B11 (Series CL-415)
- Government of Saskatchewan, Saskatchewan Public Safety Agency Air Operations, Saskatchewan: six total (originally five CL-215-6B11 (Series CL-215T), two CL215 1A10); according to the Ministry of Environment six CL-215P deployed to Airtanker Groups 3, 4 and 5

Greece

- Hellenic Air Force: 10 CL-215s as of July 2023. 7 are CL-215GR and 3 ex-Yugoslav AF

Italy

- Societa Ricerche Esperienze Meteorologiche (SoREM): five CL-215s leased abroad and operated on behalf of Protezione Civile

Spain

- Spanish Air and Space Force, 43 Grupo – 14 as of December 2016.
- Ministry of Environment (Spain): 5 ex-Spanish Air Force CL-215Ts

Thailand

- Royal Thai Navy: 2 delivered in 1978 with 1 used as search and rescue patrol

Turkey

- Gökçen Aviation of Turkish Aeronautical Association: nine CL-215s and the current contractor for the Turkish Ministry of Forestry

United States

- Bridger Aerospace: Six CL-415EAFs
- Aero-Flite, Inc. Kingman, Arizona: five CL-215s

=== Former operators ===
Croatia

- 885th Firefighting Squadron of the Croatian Air Force and Air Defence operated 2 CL-215s from 1995 to 2003. They have been replaced by 6 CL-415s.

France

- Sécurité Civile: 15 aircraft operated from June 1969 to 1996, now all replaced with 12 CL-415s.

United States

- North Carolina Division of Forest Resources - Purchased a 1969 CL-215 in 1998. Used against over 135 fires during its ten year career, it was eventually retired and sold on eBay in 2011. Sold to Buffalo Airways and now registered as C-GNCS.
- Minnesota Department of Natural Resources – operated 2 CL-215; all sold in 2015 and now replaced with Air Tractor 802F Fireboss from contractor Aero Spray of Appleton, Minnesota. Became C-GFBF but current fate unknown. N266NR became C-GDBG and now N411BT.

Venezuela

- CVG Ferrominera Orinoco: two CL-215s, one crashed on 1989, the other one has been parked ever since at Puerto Ordaz Airport

Yugoslavia

- Yugoslav Air Force: five CL-215s delivered (5th was lost in 1984 crash) and entered service with the 676th Fire Fighting Squadron from 1981 to 1992, sold by successor Air Force of Serbia and Montenegro to Greece in 1995. In 2015 ex-Yugoslav CL-215 lost in crash.

== Accidents and incidents ==
CL-215s have been involved in 31 accidents, 20 fatal.

== Aircraft on display ==
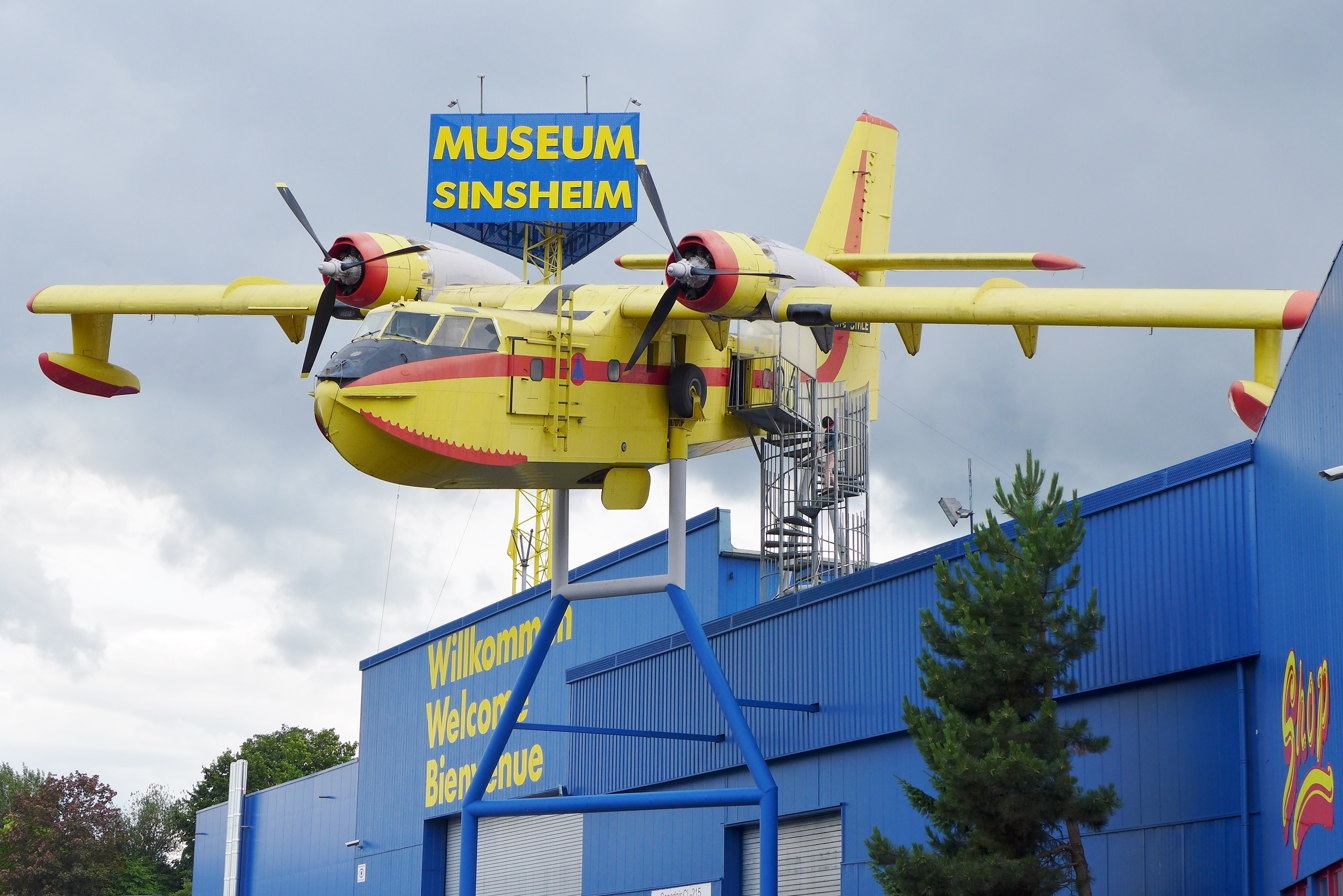
A CL-215 on static display at the Sinsheim Auto & Technik Museum, Germany, in 2014

Canada

- 1040 – CL-215 on static display at the Canadian Bushplane Heritage Centre in Sault Ste. Marie, Ontario.

France

- 1005 – CL-215 cockpit on static display at the Musée de L'Hydraviation in Biscarrosse, Nouvelle-Aquitaine.
- 1023 – CL-215 on static display at the Musée de l'Air in Le Bourget, Île-de-France.

Germany

- 1021 – CL-215 on static display at the Technik Museum Speyer in Speyer, Rhineland-Palatinate.
- 1026 – CL-215 on static display at the Sinsheim Auto & Technik Museum in Sinsheim, Baden-Württemberg.

Spain

- 1010 – CL-215 on static display at the Museo de Aeronáutica y Astronáutica in Madrid.

Thailand

- 1059 – CL-215 on static display at the Naval Aviation Museum.

== Specifications (CL-215) ==
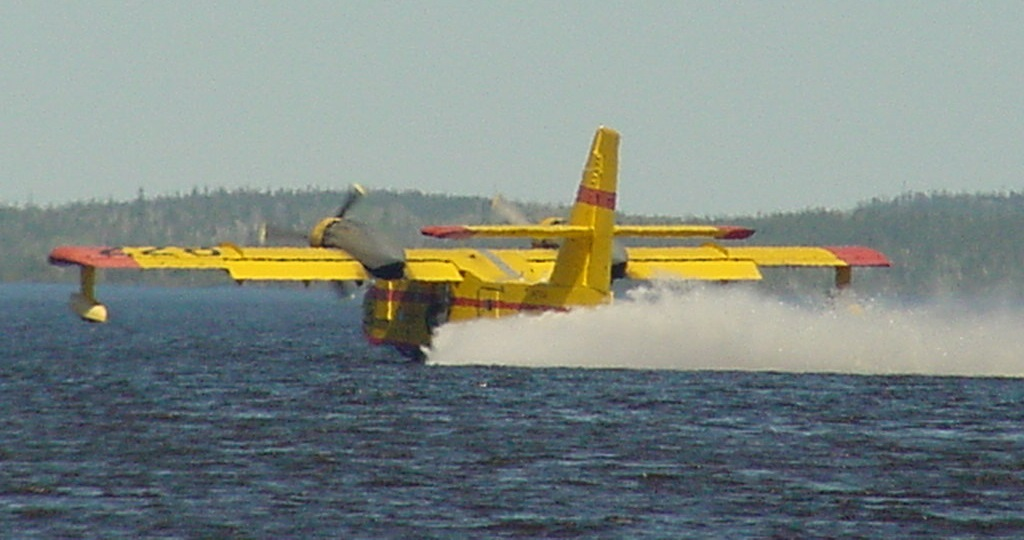
A CL-215 in the Abitibi-Témiscamingue region, in the Canadian province of Québec

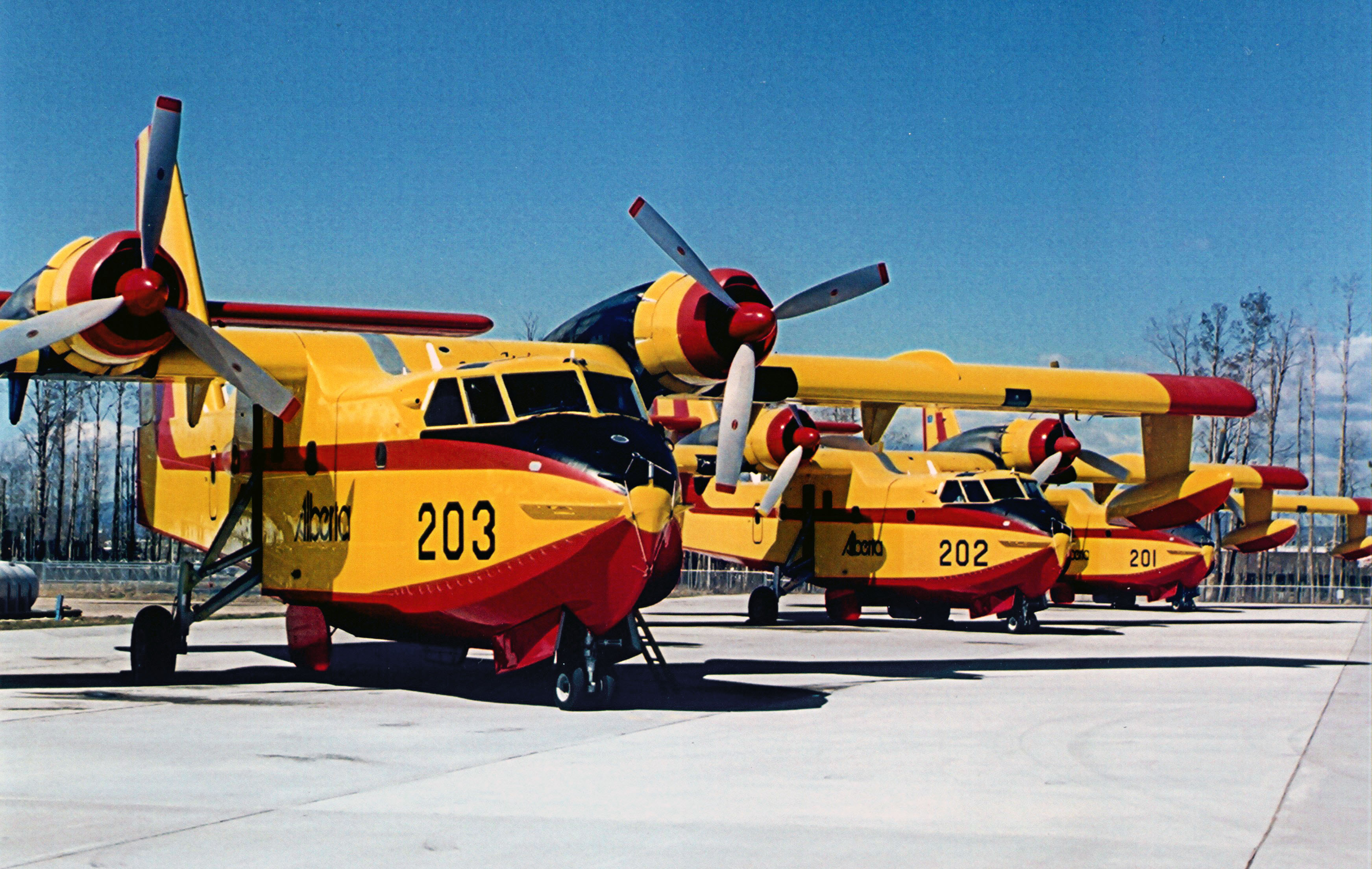
CL-215s belonging to the Canadian province of Alberta

Data from Jane's All the World's Aircraft 1984–85, Flight International

General characteristics

- Crew: Two
- Capacity: 5,450 L (1200 imp gal; 1,440 US gal)(waterbombing), up to 26 forward facing seats for passenger transport
- Length: 19.82 m (65 ft 0 in)
- Wingspan: 28.6 m (93 ft 10 in)
- Height: 8.92 m (29 ft 3 in)
- Wing area: 100.33 m^{2} (1,079.9 sq ft)
- Aspect ratio: 8.15
- Empty weight: 12,160 kg (26,808 lb)
- Max takeoff weight: 19,731 kg (43,499 lb) on land, 17,100 kg (37,700 lb) on water
- Fuel capacity: 5,910 L (1,561.3 US gal; 1,300.0 imp gal) in two fuel tanks, of eight cells each, in the wings
- Powerplant: 2 × Pratt & Whitney R-2800-83AM 18-cylinder air-cooled radial piston engines, 1,566 kW (2,100 hp) each
- Propellers: 3-bladed Hamilton Standard Hydromatic constant-speed fully feathering propeller

Performance

- Cruise speed: 291 km/h (181 mph, 157 kn) at 18,595 kg (40,995 lb) and 3,050 m (10,000 ft)
- Stall speed: 123 km/h (76 mph, 66 kn) 25° flap power off at 15,603 kg (34,399 lb)
- Range: 2,094 km (1,301 mi, 1,131 nmi) with 1,587 kg (3,499 lb) payload at long-range cruise power
- Rate of climb: 5 m/s (980 ft/min)

Avionics

- Dual VHF and VHF/FM comms,
- VOR/ILS receivers
- ADF
- Marker Beacon Rx
- Transponder

== See also ==
Related development

- Canadair CL-415

Aircraft of comparable role, configuration, and era

- Beriev Be-200
- Consolidated PBY Catalina
- Grumman HU-16 Albatross
- Harbin SH-5
- ShinMaywa US-1A
