= Roccapreturo =

- Frazione
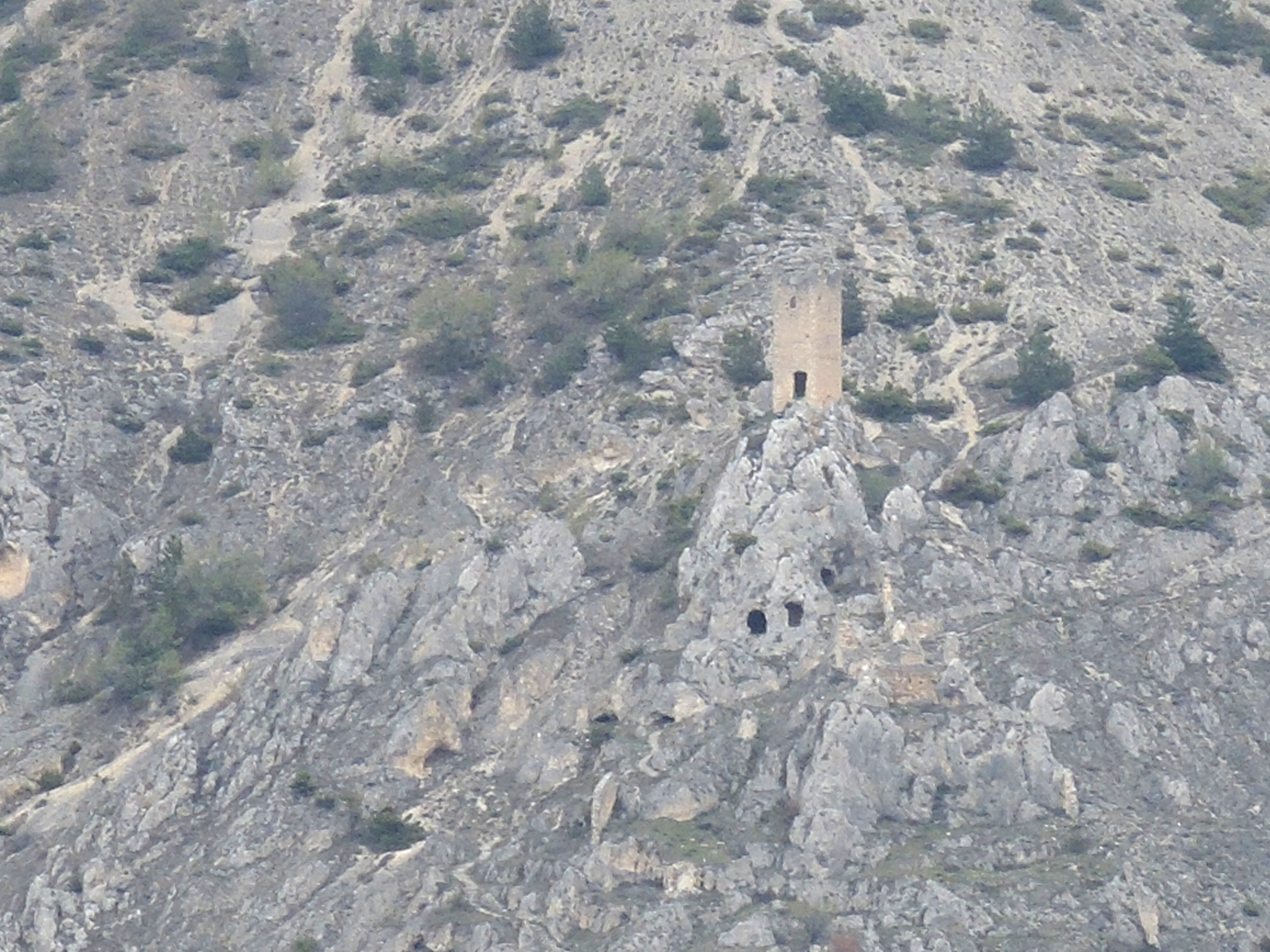
- Interactive map of Roccapreturo
- Country: Italy
- Region: Abruzzo
- Province: L'Aquila
- Commune: Acciano
- Time zone: UTC+1 (CET)
  - Summer (DST): UTC+2 (CEST)

Roccapreturo is a frazione of Acciano, in the Province of L'Aquila in the Abruzzo, region of Italy. It is one of a circuit of villages and hamlets around Monte Sirente.

== See also ==
- Count of Roccapreturo
