= 52nd Airlift Squadron =

52d Airlift Squadron
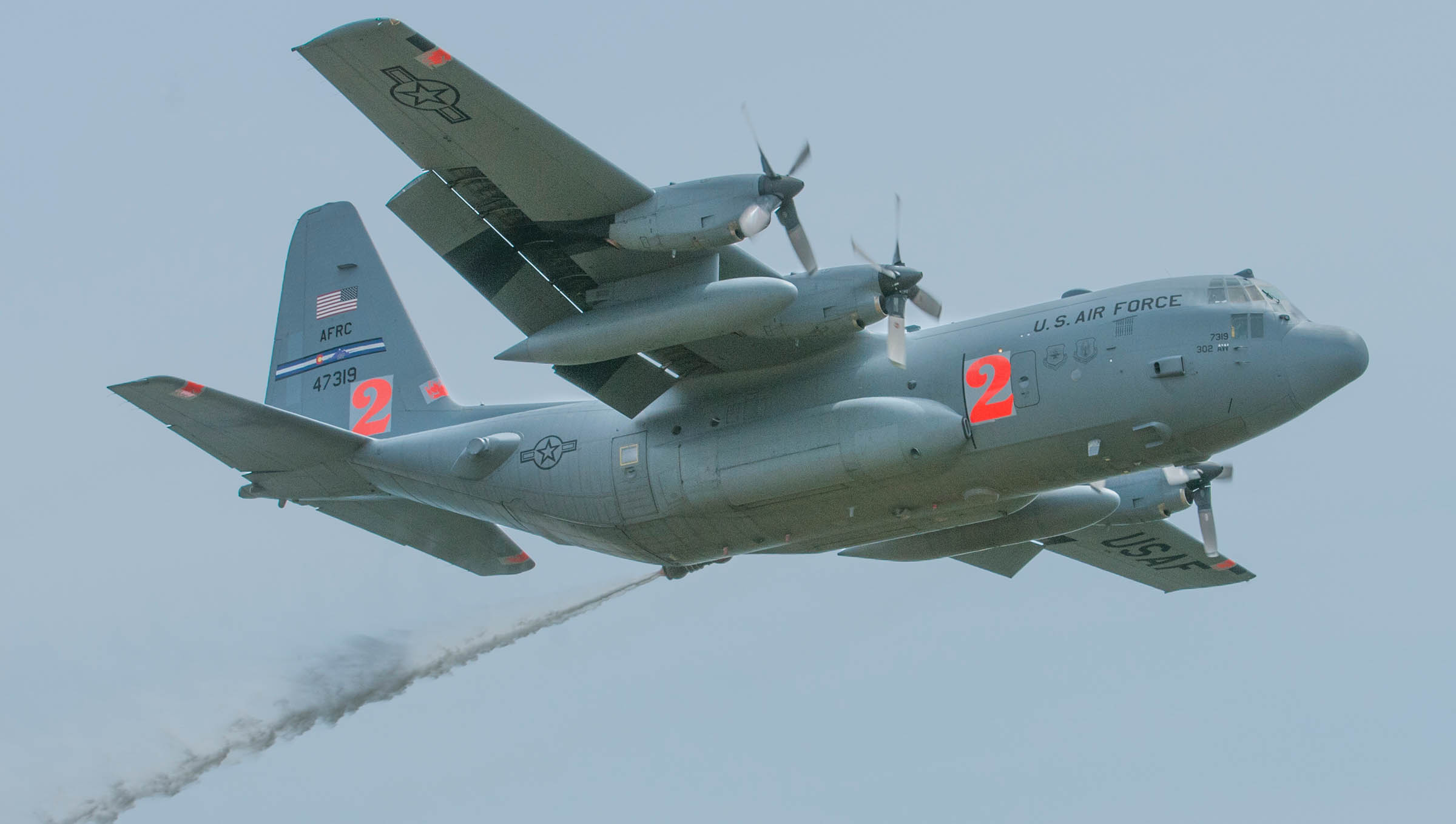
- A 302d Airlift Wing C-130H3 Hercules from Peterson AFB conducts annual training with the Modular Airborne Fire Fighting System
- Active: 1942–1944; 1949–1951; 1953–1969; 1998–1992; 1994–1997; 2009–2015
- Country: United States
- Branch: United States Air Force
- Role: Airlift
- Part of: Air Mobility Command
- Nicknames: Fighting 'Roos, Combat 'Roos
- Colors: Green
- Mascot: Kangaroo
- Engagements: Operation Just Cause; Persian Gulf War; Operation Southern Watch; Operation Enduring Freedom; Combined Joint Task Force - Horn of Africa
- Decorations: Air Force Outstanding Unit Award; Republic of Vietnam Gallantry Cross with Palm

Insignia
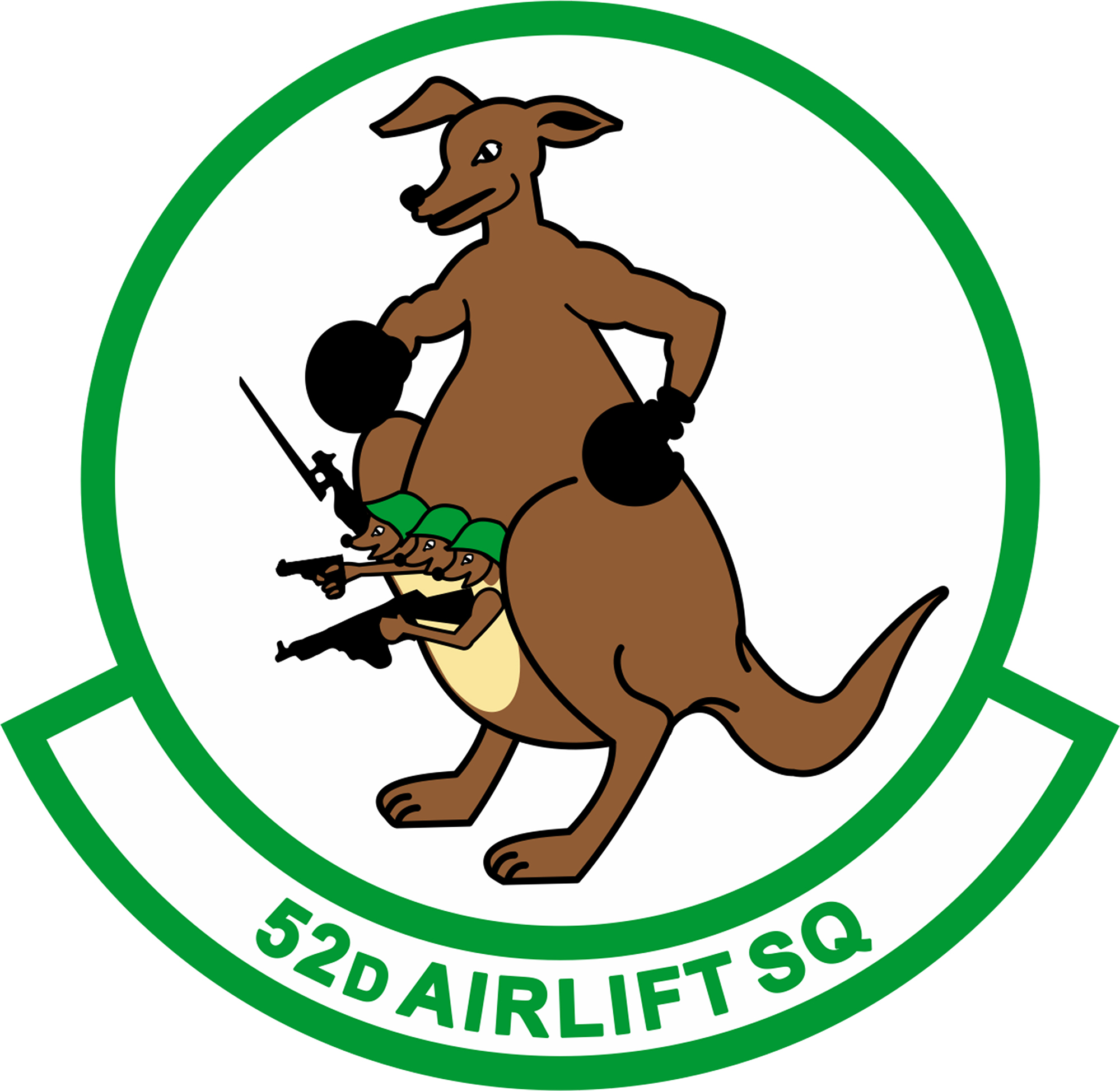
- 52d Airlift Squadron emblem (Approved, 1 May 1994)

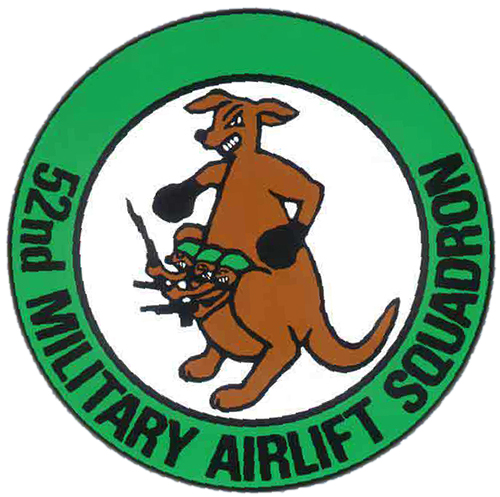
- 52d Military Airlift Squadron emblem (Modified, 1 Jun 1988)

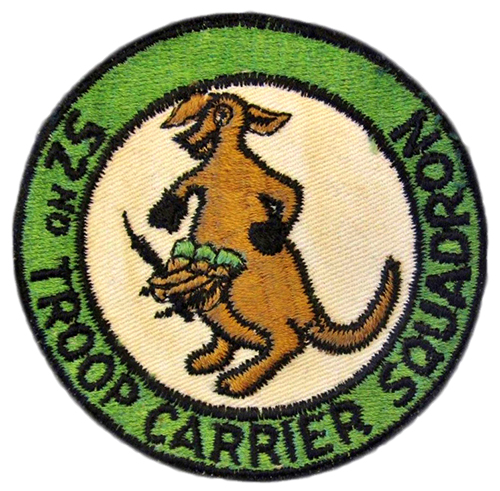
- 52d Troop Carrier Squadron, Heavy emblem (Modified, 20 Jun 1953)

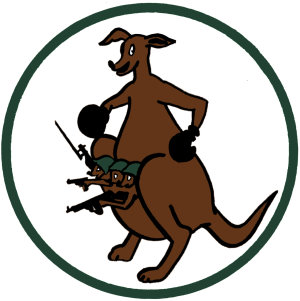
- 52d Troop Carrier Squadron emblem (Approved, 14 May 1943)

The 52d Airlift Squadron is an inactive United States Air Force unit, last assigned to the 19th Airlift Wing but based at Peterson Air Force Base, Colorado. It was an active-duty associate unit integrated with the Air Force Reserve, 302d Airlift Wing and 731st Airlift Squadron. It operated the Lockheed C-130H Hercules aircraft of its parent Reserve unit, conducting tactical airlift, airdrop and aerial firefighting missions utilizing the Modular Airborne Fire Fighting System (MAFFS). The Fighting 'Roos were last active from 3 Oct 2009 until 30 Sept 2015.

== History ==
=== World War II ===
The squadron was first activated at Camp Williams, Wisconsin in June 1942 as the 52d Transport Squadron as the 63d Transport Group expanded from three to four squadrons. A few weeks after it was organized, the unit became the 52d Troop Carrier Squadron. It was equipped with various civilian and military versions of the Douglas DC-3, including the Douglas C-47 Skytrain and the C-53 Skytrooper. The squadron acted as a Replacement Training Unit (RTU). RTUs were oversized units that trained individual pilots or aircrews for service in combat theaters.

The squadron moved its operations several times, arriving at Sedalia Army Air Field, Missouri in January 1944. However, the Army Air Forces was finding that standard military units, based on relatively inflexible tables of organization were not proving well adapted to the training mission. Accordingly, it adopted a more functional system in which each base was organized into a separate numbered unit. The 52d was disbanded, and along with other units at Sedalia Army Air Field, was replaced by the 813th AAF Base Unit (Combat Crew Training School, Troop Carrier).

=== Continental Air Command ===
The squadron was reconstituted and reactivated at Floyd Bennett Field, New York in June 1949, when Continental Air Command reorganized its reserve units under the wing base organization system, which placed both operational and support organizations under a single wing. Under the 1949 reserve plan, the squadron was manned at only 25% of its authorized strength. It trained with C-47s and a variety of trainer aircraft under the guidance of the regular 2230th Air Force Reserve Training Center.

Along with all reserve combat units, the squadron was mobilized for the Korean War. It was included in the second wave of reserve unit callups, entering active duty on 1 May 1951. Its personnel were used as fillers for other units and the squadron was inactivated on 9 May.

=== 1953-1969 C-124 Globemaster II Operations ===
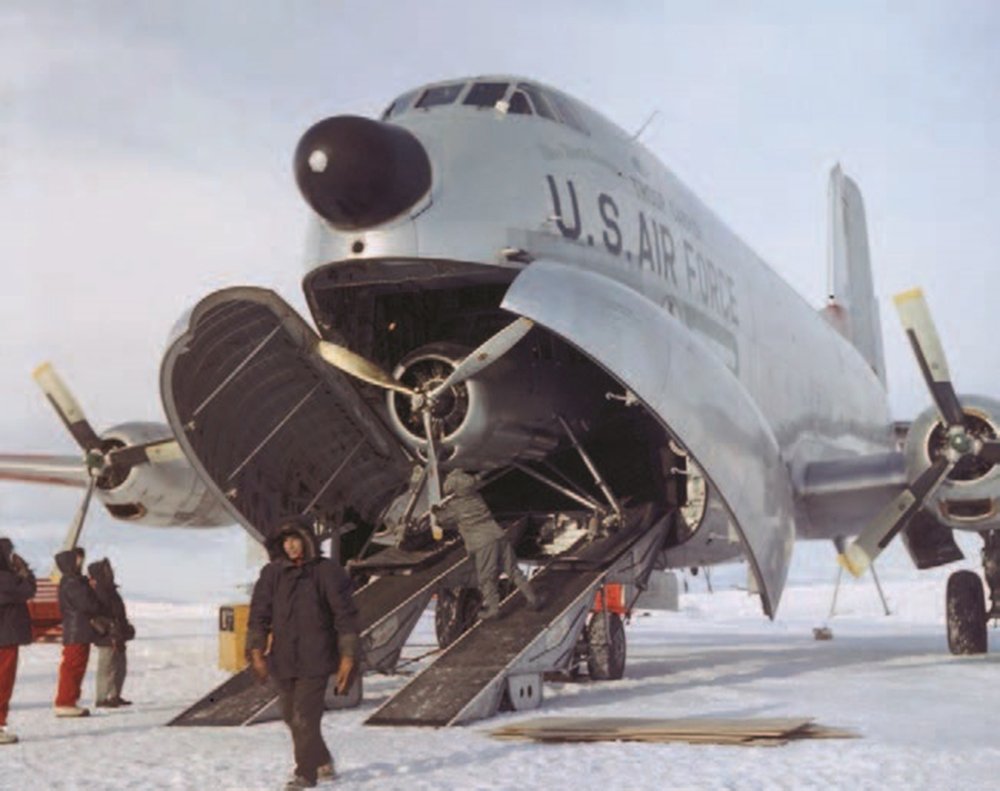
52d Troop Carrier Squadron, DEEP FREEZE II, McMurdo Station Antarctica 1956

Reactivated on 20 June 1953, worldwide airlift with the C-124 Globemaster II 1953–1969. Undertook arctic airlift missions for construction of Distant Early Warning Line sites in Alaska, Canada, and Greenland 1955–1956. Supported initial Operation Deep Freeze II at the South Pole, conducted first Antarctic U.S. Air Force ice-landing and airdrop of supplies, equipment and personnel to Amundsen–Scott South Pole Station and McMurdo Station 1956–1958. Provided european airlift in support of the Berlin Crisis of 1961 and initial Exercise Reforger. Redesignated as 52d Military Airlift Squadron on 8 January 1966, inactivated 8 February 1969.

=== 1988-1997 C-141/C-130 Operations ===
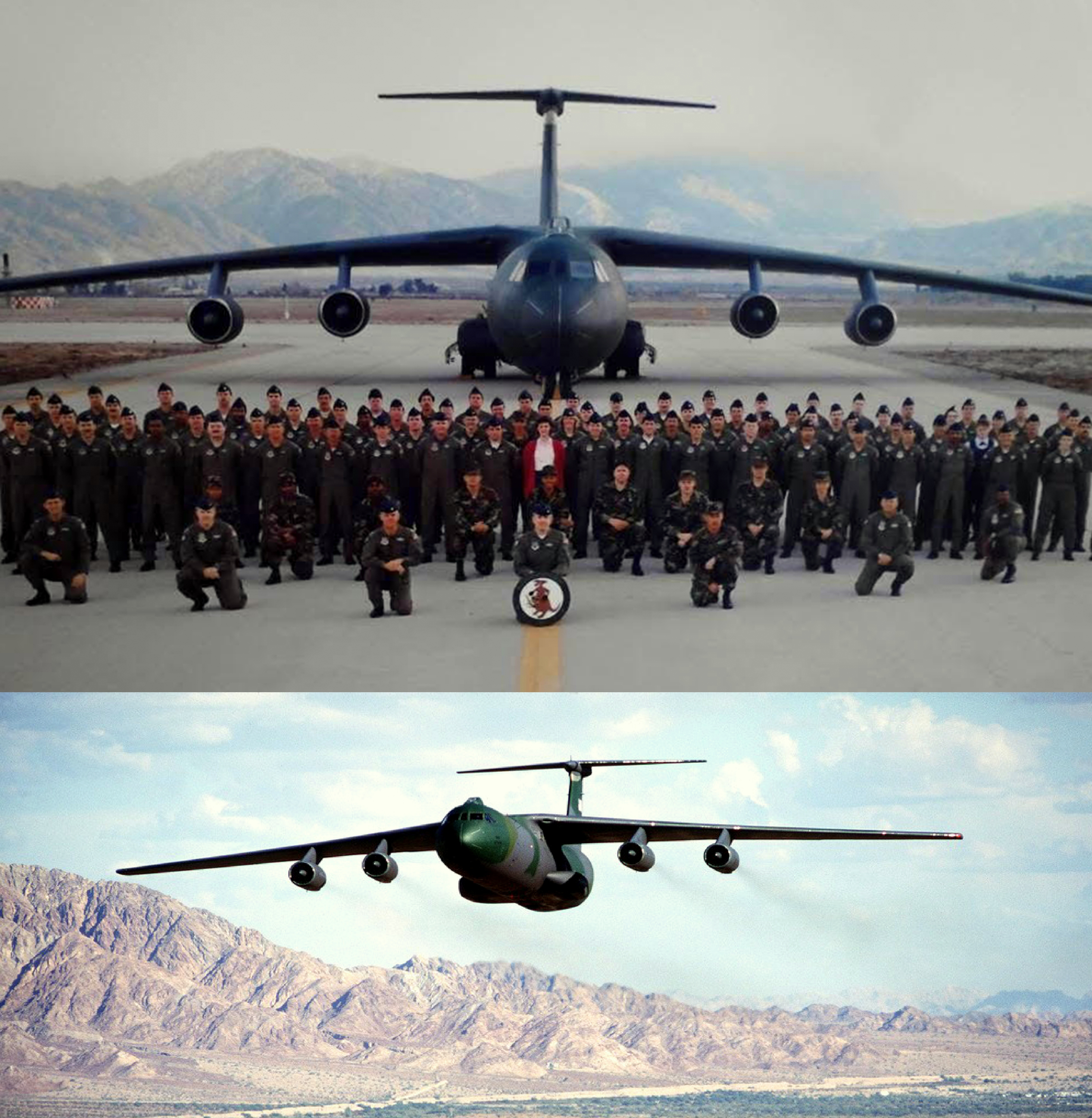
52d Military Airlift Squadron, Norton AFB 1990

Reactivated on 1 June 1988 for worldwide strategic airlift, 1988–1992 with the Lockheed C-141B Starlifter, including airdrop of troops and equipment in Operation Just Cause in Panama on 20 December 1989. Conducted strategic airlift of equipment and personnel supporting Operation Desert Shield, Operation Desert Storm and Operation Desert Farewell, 1990-1991. Redesignated as 52d Airlift Squadron on 1 January 1992. Inactivated on 30 September 1992. Reactivated on 1 May 1994 at Moody Air Force Base in the tactical airlift role with the C-130E Hercules, 1994–1997. Participated in numerous Joint Airlift/Air Transportability Training exercises with 82d Airborne Division at Pope AFB, NC. Deployed aircraft and personnel to Prince Sultan AB, Saudi Arabia and Seeb AB, Oman, in support of Operation Southern Watch, 1996 - 1997. Inactivated on 16 September 1997.

=== 2009-2015 C-130 Active-Duty Associate ===
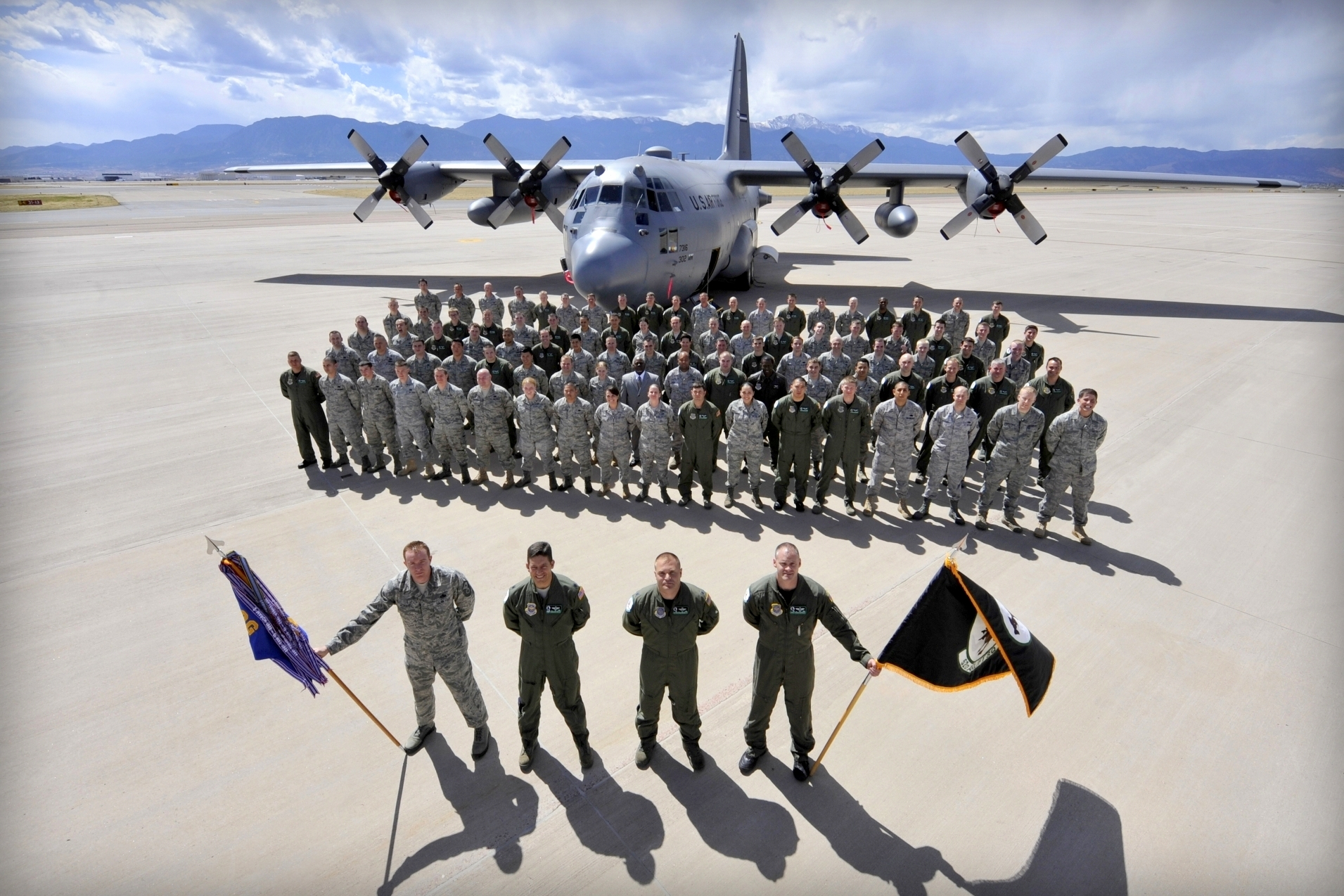
52d Airlift Squadron, Peterson AFB 2011

Organization reactivated to active-duty on 3 October 2009 with C-130H3 Hercules as an active associate tactical airlift squadron assigned to 19th Airlift Wing, Little Rock Air Force Base Arkansas, but based and integrated with the Air Force Reserve's 302d Airlift Wing and 731st Airlift Squadron at Peterson Air Force Base, Colorado. This association under the "Total Force Integration" (TFI) program allows active-duty, Air National Guard and Air Force Reserve organizations to make more efficient combined use of aircraft, personnel and facilities.

Participated in Operation Enduring Freedom, Operation Freedom's Sentinel and Combined Joint Task Force - Horn of Africa deploying as the 774th Expeditionary Airlift Squadron at Bagram Air Base, 746th Expeditionary Airlift Squadron at Al Udeid Air Base and 52d Expeditionary Airlift Squadron at Camp Lemonnier. Conducted CENTCOM tactical airland resupply and combat airdrop missions supporting the War in Afghanistan (2001–2021) 2011 – 2015.

In addition to intra-theater tactical airlift, the 52d was co-assigned specialized aerial firefighting missions with the MAFFS Air Expeditionary Group (AEG), 302d Airlift Wing and 731st Airlift Squadron using Modular Airborne Fire Fighting Systems. While six separate MAFFS II systems are utilized by three other participating MAFFS AEG units (146th Airlift Wing, 152nd Airlift Wing, 153rd Airlift Wing), 302d Airlift Wing aircraft, crews and MAFFS II systems are identified by the blaze-orange MAFFS 2 and MAFFS 5 aircraft fuselage and tail markings. The Aero Union designed MAFFS II system can discharge its load of 3,000 gallons weighing 27,000 pounds in less than five seconds or can make incremental drops for multiple passes. The retardant can cover an area one-quarter of a mile long and 100 feet wide. After the aircraft discharges its Phos-Chek retardant or water load, it can be rapidly refilled at tanker ground bases in less than twelve minutes for expedited wildfire re-attack. Select members of the 52d conducted MAFFS aerial firefighting missions throughout California, Oregon, Colorado, Idaho, Wyoming, Nevada, Utah and Arizona supporting the U.S. Forest Service and National Interagency Fire Center 2011 - 2015.

Due to FY15 USAF Budget requirements and associated Force Structure changes, on 30 September 2015 the 52d Airlift Squadron was formally inactivated with remaining squadron members re-assigned back to the 19th Airlift Wing.

== Lineage ==
- Constituted as the 52d Transport Squadron on 30 May 1942

Activated on 15 June 1942
Redesignated 52d Troop Carrier Squadron on 4 July 1942
Disbanded on 14 April 1944

- Reconstituted and redesignated 52d Troop Carrier Squadron, Medium on 10 May 1949

Activated in the reserve on 27 June 1949
Ordered to active service on 1 May 1951
Inactivated on 9 May 1951

- Redesignated 52d Troop Carrier Squadron, Heavy on 19 March 1953

Activated on 20 June 1953
Redesignated as: 52d Military Airlift Squadron on 8 January 1966
Inactivated on 8 February 1969

- Activated on 1 June 1988

Redesignated as 52d Airlift Squadron on 1 January 1992
Inactivated on 30 September 1992

- Activated on 1 May 1994

Inactivated on 27 September 1997

- Activated on 3 October 2009

Inactivated on 30 September 2015

=== Assignments ===
- 63d Transport Group (later 63d Troop Carrier Group), 15 June 1942 – 14 April 1944
- 63d Troop Carrier Group, 27 June 1949 – 9 May 1951
- 63d Troop Carrier Group, 20 June 1953 (attached for operational control to 322d Air Division, c. 29 January-c. 1 August 1960 and c. January 1962)
- 63d Troop Carrier Wing (later 63d Military Airlift) Wing), 18 January 1963 (remained under operational control of 322d Air Division)
- 436th Military Airlift Wing, 8 January 1967 – 8 February 1969 (remained under operational control of 322d Air Division)
- 63d Military Airlift Wing, 1 June 1988

63d Operations Group, 1 January-30 September 1992

- 347th Operations Group, 1 May 1994 – 1 April 1997
- 19th Operations Group, 3 October 2009 – 30 September 2015

=== Stations ===
- Camp Williams, Wisconsin, 15 June 1942
- Dodd Field, Texas, 17 September 1942
- Stuttgart Army Air Field, Arkansas, 18 November 1942
- Victorville Army Air Field, California, 25 December 1942
- Lawson Field, Georgia, 5 May 1943
- Grenada Army Air Field, Mississippi, 3 June 1943
- Sedalia Army Air Field, Missouri, c. 19 January- 14 April 1944
- Floyd Bennett Field, New York, 27 June 1949 – 9 May 1951
- Altus Air Force Base, Oklahoma, 20 June 1953
- Donaldson Air Force Base, South Carolina, 15 October 1953 (operated from Rhein-Main Air Base, Germany, 29 January-c. 1 August 1960 and after c. January 1962)
- Hunter Air Force Base, Georgia, 30 June 1963 (continued to operate from Rhein-Main Air Base)
- Dover Air Force Base, Delaware, 8 January 1967 – 8 February 1969 (continued to operate from Rhein-Main Air Base)
- Norton Air Force Base, California, 1 June 1988 – 30 September 1992
- Moody Air Force Base, Georgia, 1 May 1994 – 1 April 1997
- Peterson Air Force Base, Colorado, 3 October 2009 – 30 September 2015

=== Aircraft ===
- Douglas DC-3, 1942
- Douglas C-39, 1942
- Douglas C-53 Skytrooper, 1942–1943
- Douglas C-47 Skytrain, 1942–1944; 1949–1951
- North American T-6 Texan, 1949–1950
- Beechcraft T-7 Navigator, 1949–1951
- Beechcraft T-11 Kansan, 1949–1951
- Douglas C-124 Globemaster II, 1953–1969
- Lockheed C-141B Starlifter, 1988–1992
- Lockheed C-130E Hercules, 1994–1997
- Lockheed C-130H3 Hercules, 2009–2015
