= Fire retardant =

Substance reducing flammability

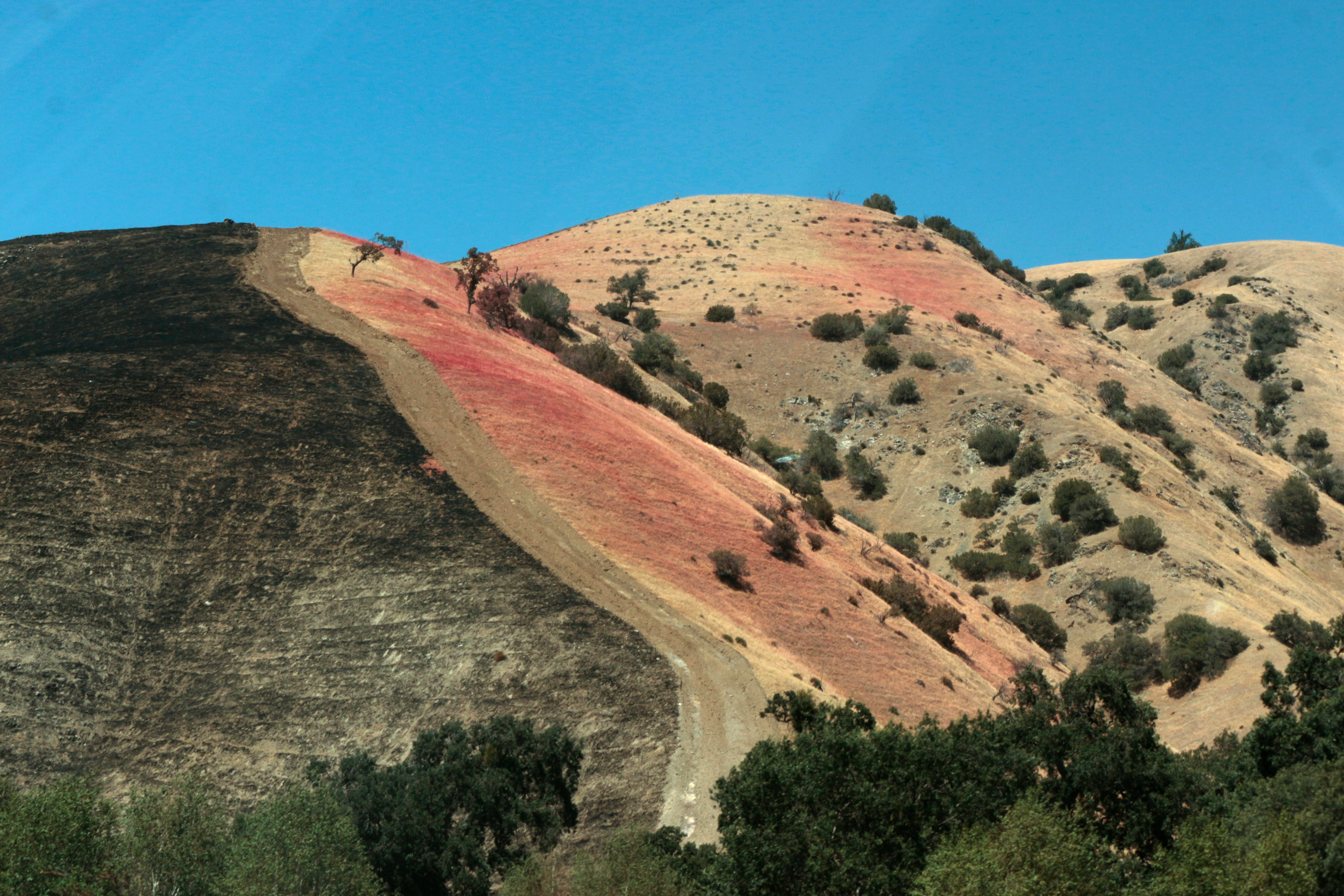
Fire retardant dispersed aerially onto brush adjoining a firebreak to contain the Tumbleweed Fire in California, in July 2021

A fire retardant is a substance that is used to slow down or stop the spread of fire or reduce its intensity. This is commonly accomplished by chemical reactions that reduce the flammability of fuels or delay their combustion. Fire retardants may also cool the fuel through physical action or endothermic chemical reactions. Fire retardants are available as powder, to be mixed with water, as fire-fighting foams and fire-retardant gels.

Fire retardants are commonly used in fire fighting, where they may be applied aerially or from the ground.

== Principles of operation ==
In general, fire retardants reduce the flammability of materials by either blocking the fire physically or by initiating a chemical reaction that stops the fire.

=== Physical action ===
There are several ways in which the combustion process can be retarded by physical action:

- By cooling: Some chemical reactions actually cool the material down.
- By forming a protective layer that prevents the underlying material from igniting.
- By dilution: Some retardants release water and/or carbon dioxide while burning. This may dilute the radicals in the flame enough for it to go out.

Commonly used fire retardant additives include mixtures of huntite (Mg_{3}Ca(CO_{3})_{4}) and hydromagnesite (Mg_{5}(CO_{3})_{4}(OH)_{2}·4H_{2}O), aluminium hydroxide (Al(OH)_{3}), and magnesium hydroxide (Mg(OH)_{2}). When heated, aluminium hydroxide dehydrates to form aluminum oxide (alumina, Al_{2}O_{3}), releasing water vapor in the process. This reaction absorbs a great deal of heat, cooling the material into which it is incorporated. Additionally, alumina residue forms a protective layer on the material's surface. Mixtures of huntite and hydromagnesite work in a similar manner. They endothermically decompose releasing both water and carbon dioxide, giving fire retardant properties to the materials in which they are incorporated.

=== Chemical action ===
- Reactions in the gas phase: chemical reactions in the flame (i.e. gas phase) can be interrupted by fire retardants. Generally, these retardants are organic halides (haloalkanes) such as Halon and PhostrEx. The chemicals used in these types of retardants are often toxic.
- Reaction in the solid phase: some retardants break down polymers so they melt and flow away from the flame. Although this allows some materials to pass certain flammability tests, it is not known whether fire safety is truly improved by the production of flammable plastic droplets.
- Char Formation: For carbon-based fuels, solid phase flame retardants cause a layer of carbonaceous char to form on the fuel surface. This char layer is much harder to burn and prevents further burning.
- Intumescents: These types of retardant materials incorporate chemicals which cause swelling behind the protective char layer, providing much better insulation. They are available as plastic additives, and as paints for protecting wooden buildings or steel structures.

== Uses ==
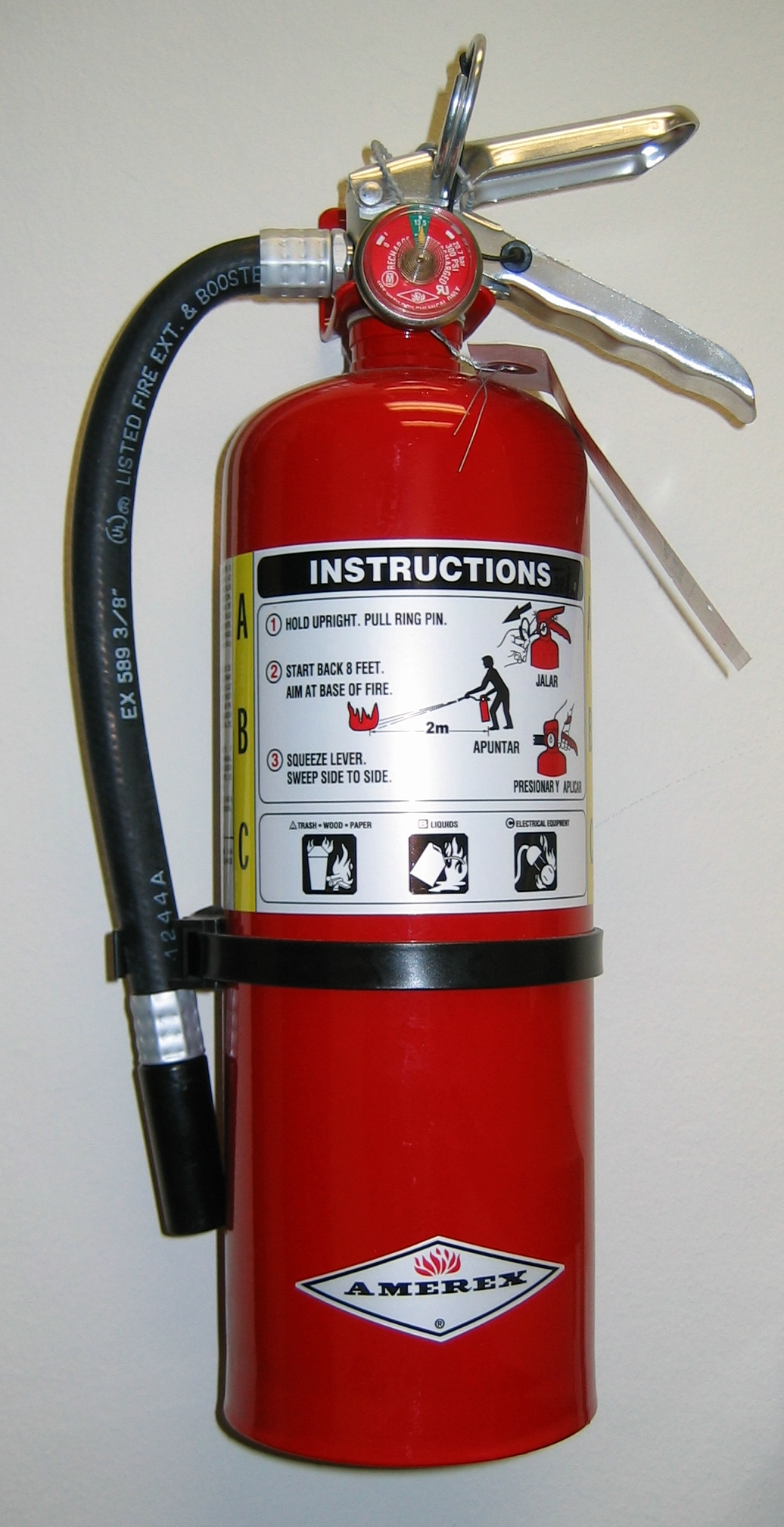
Portable fire extinguisher

=== Fire extinguishers ===
Class A foam is used as a fire retardant in 2.5 gallon [APW] and [CAFS] extinguishers to contain incipient brush fires and grass fires by creating a fire break. Other chemical retardants are capable of rendering class A material and Class B fuels non-flammable and extinguishing class A, class B, and some class D fires. Fire retardant slurries dropped from aircraft are normally applied ahead of a wildfire to prevent ignition, while fire suppression agents are used to extinguish fires.

=== Surface coating ===
Objects may be coated with fire retardants. For example, Christmas trees are sprayed with retardants, as a tree dries out it becomes very flammable and a fire-hazard.

Steel structures have a fire retardant coating around columns and beams to prevent structural elements from weakening during a fire.

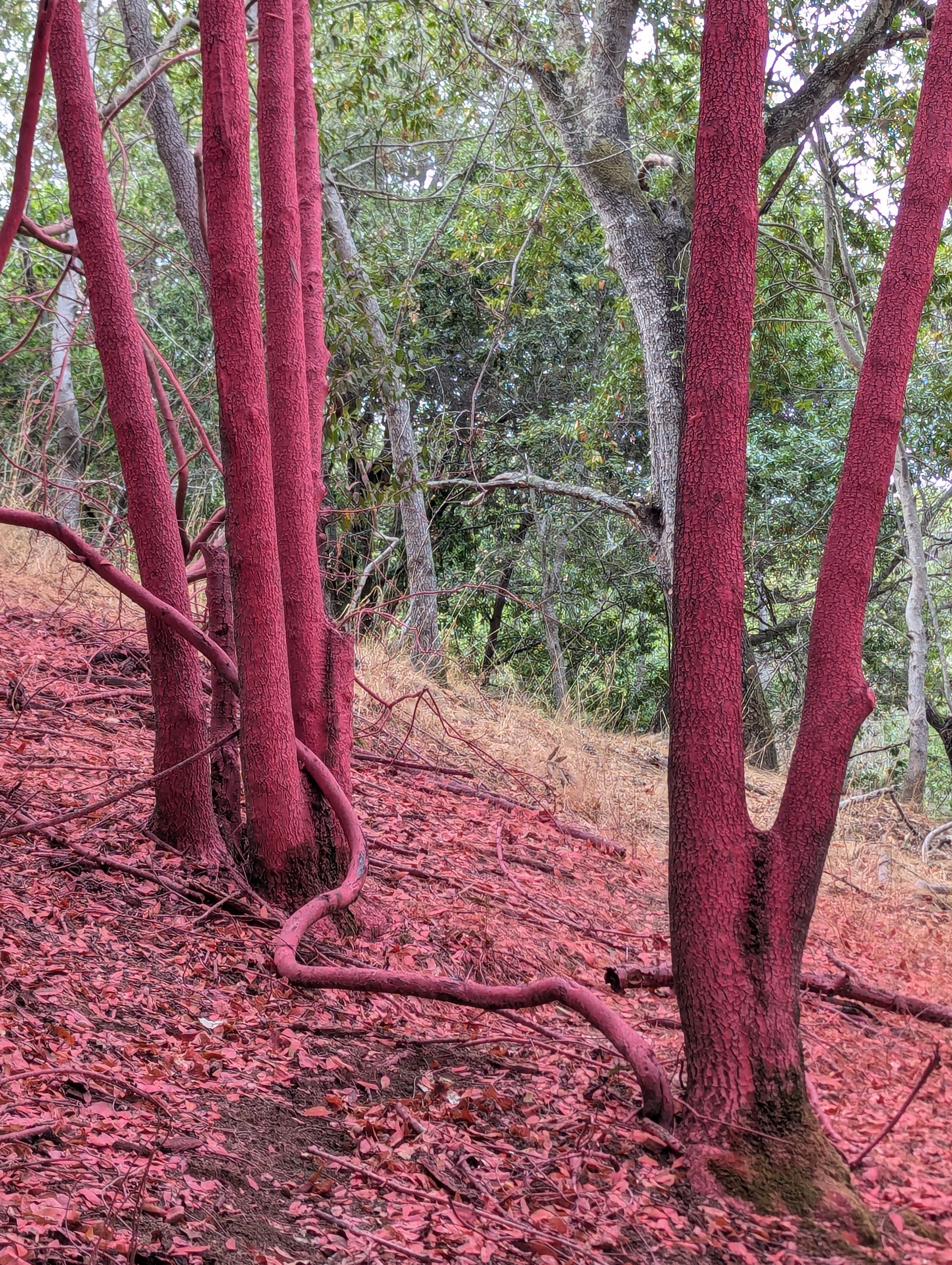
Aerial fire retardant in a forested area following a wildfire in Novato, California

Dormitories in the US are considering or are required by law to use these products. Intumescent coatings are used by various dormitories and in school buildings, especially those with historic structures that lack fire sprinkler systems.

=== Forest-fire fighting ===
Early fire retardants were mixtures of water and thickening agents, and later included borates and ammonium phosphates.

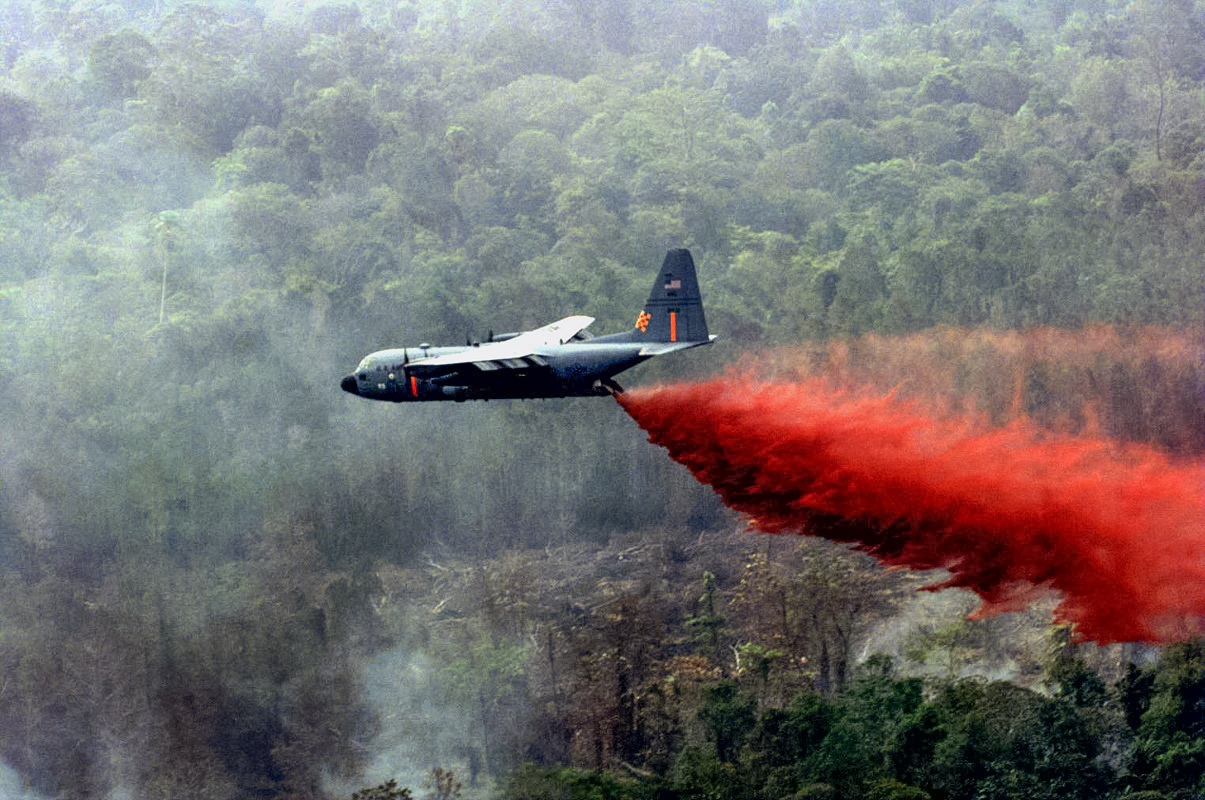
A MAFFS-equipped Air National Guard C-130 Hercules drops fire retardant on wildfires in Southern California

Generally, fire retardants are dropped from aircraft or applied by ground crews around a wildfire's edges in an effort to contain its spread. This allows ground crews time to work to extinguish the fire. However, when needed, retardant can also be dropped directly onto flames to cool the fire and reduce flame length.

==== Aerial firefighting ====
Aerial firefighting is a method to combat wildfires using aircraft. The types of aircraft used include fixed-wing aircraft and helicopters. Smokejumpers and rappellers are also classified as aerial firefighters, being delivered by parachute from a variety of fixed-wing aircraft, or rappelling from helicopters. Chemicals used to fight fires may include water, water enhancers, or specially-formulated fire retardants.

== Materials ==
=== Wildfire retardants ===
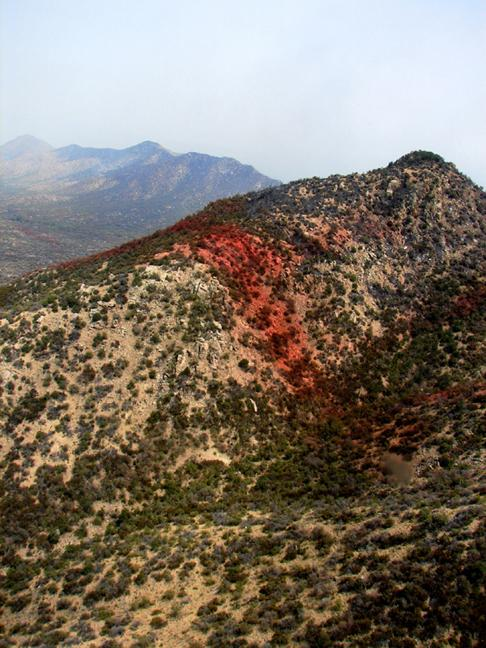
Red-dyed line of fire retardant stands out clearly on this Arizona hill, to control the Alambre Fire

Fire retardants applied to wildfires are usually a mixture of water and chemicals designed to wet the area as well as chemically retard a fire's progression through vegetation. Typically they are colored so that the application area can be seen from the air. Fire retardant gel based retardants which meet NFPA Standard 1150 are also used. These are dyed other colors to differentiate them from the traditional red retardant. The gels and their dyes are designed to biodegrade naturally.

Researchers at the University of Southern California's Department of Civil and Environmental Engineering published a report titled "Metals in Wildfire Suppressants". The report provided the first-ever chemical analysis of Phos-Chek fire retardant, which the research team studied because it is the most widely used. The USC researchers found that Phos-Chek contains high levels of heavy metals: 14.4 mg/L of cadmium, 72.7 mg/L of chromium, and 119 mg/L of vanadium. These numbers exceed California toxic waste limits by 14 times, 14 times, and 5 times, respectively.

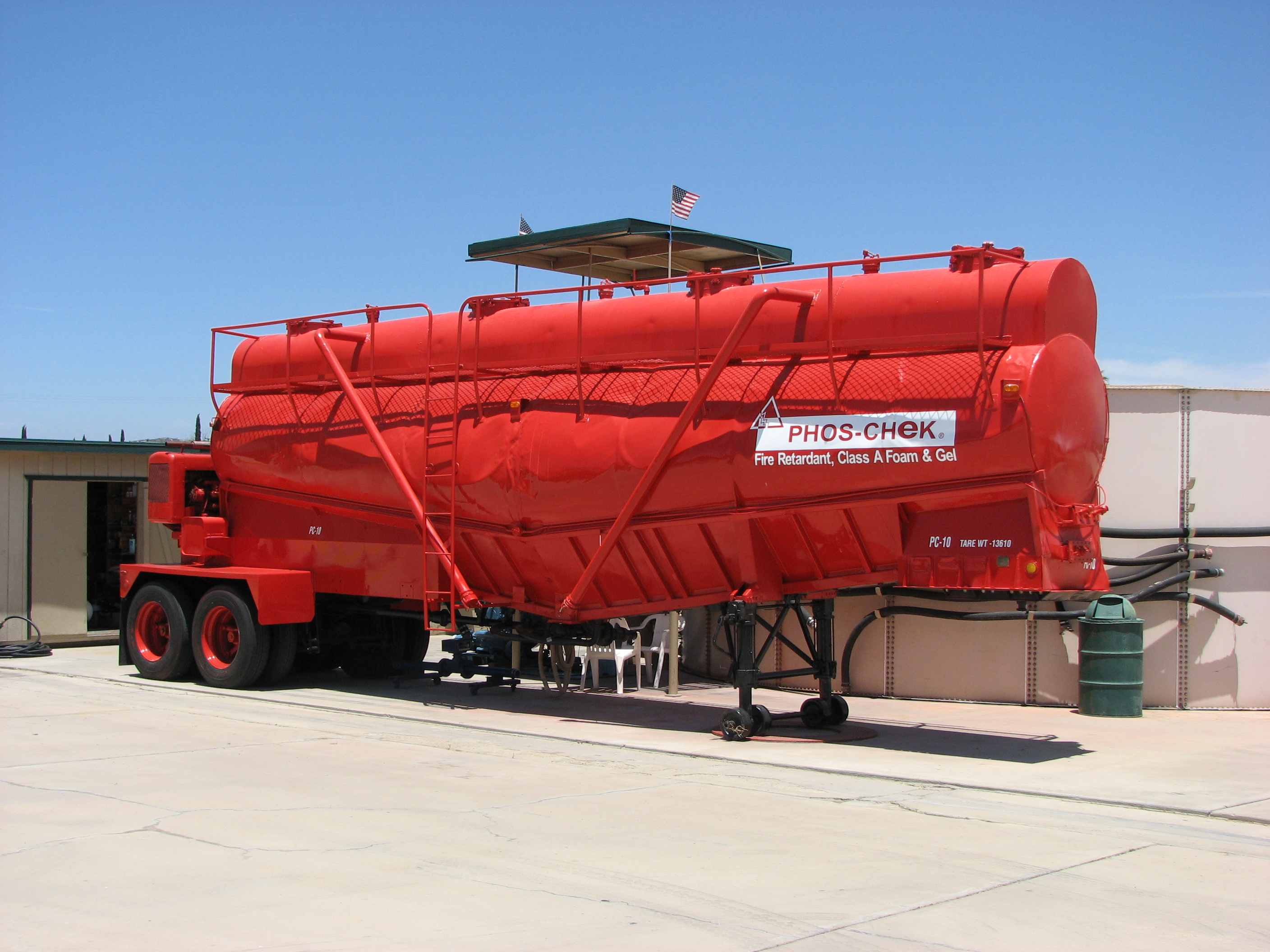
A Phos-Chek tank trailer at Ramona Airport

Phos-Chek also has a consumer-based fire retardant spray called Wildfire Home Defense that is effective immediately after application and that remains effective until it is washed off with heavy water levels. It is designed to be applied to fuel beds around homes and outbuildings to create a firebreak in the fuels leading up to each structure. Ember Bloc is another consumer-based fire retardant gel that can be applied to the exterior of one's house and nearby structures to help protect against both embers and flames in a wildfire. It has a unique ability to cling onto the side of a house to withstand high heat and windy conditions.

== Environmental concerns ==
Forest fire retardants that are used are generally considered non-toxic, but even less-toxic compounds carry some risk when organisms are exposed to large amounts. As of 2008, drops within 300 feet of bodies of water are generally discouraged unless lives or property are directly threatened. The US Forest Service is the governing agency that conducts research and monitors the effect of fire retardants on wildland systems in the US.

== Potential risk and health concerns ==
Some specialized indoor fire retardants are organic halides (haloalkanes) such as Halon and PhostrEx, which are proven to be toxic.

Studies have also shown that a drop of the retardant chemical directly into a stream may increase the ammonia concentration in the water to levels that are lethal for fish and other aquatic organisms.

Another notable health concern is that fire-suppressant foams are especially toxic to fish in standardized soft and hard water, possibly due to surfactants.

== United States ==
Perimeter Solutions the maker of Phos-Chek holds a monopoly on fire retardant in the United States.

== See also ==
- Aerial firefighting
- Ammonium polyphosphate, a fire retardant
- Flame retardant
- List of fire-retardant materials
- Modular Airborne FireFighting System
- Phos-Chek, a foam or gel commercial fire retardant
- Wildland fire suppression
