= Phos-Chek =

Fire retardant

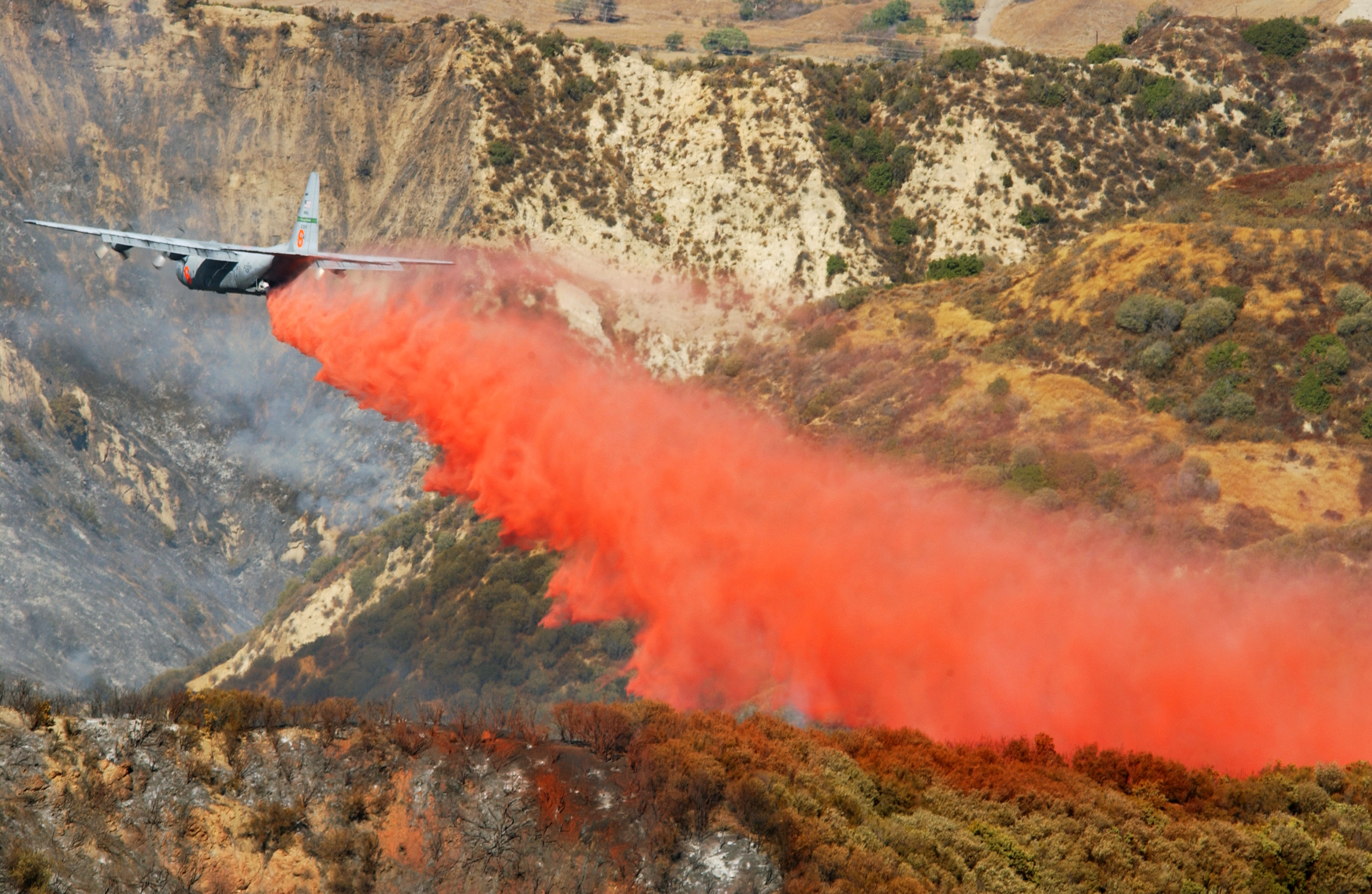
C-130E Hercules equipped with a Modular Airborne FireFighting System makes a Phos-Chek fire retardant drop in Southern California in October 2003.

Phos-Chek is a brand of long-term fire retardants, class A foams, and gels manufactured by Perimeter Solutions, headquartered in Clayton, Missouri, United States.

== Products ==
=== Fire retardants ===
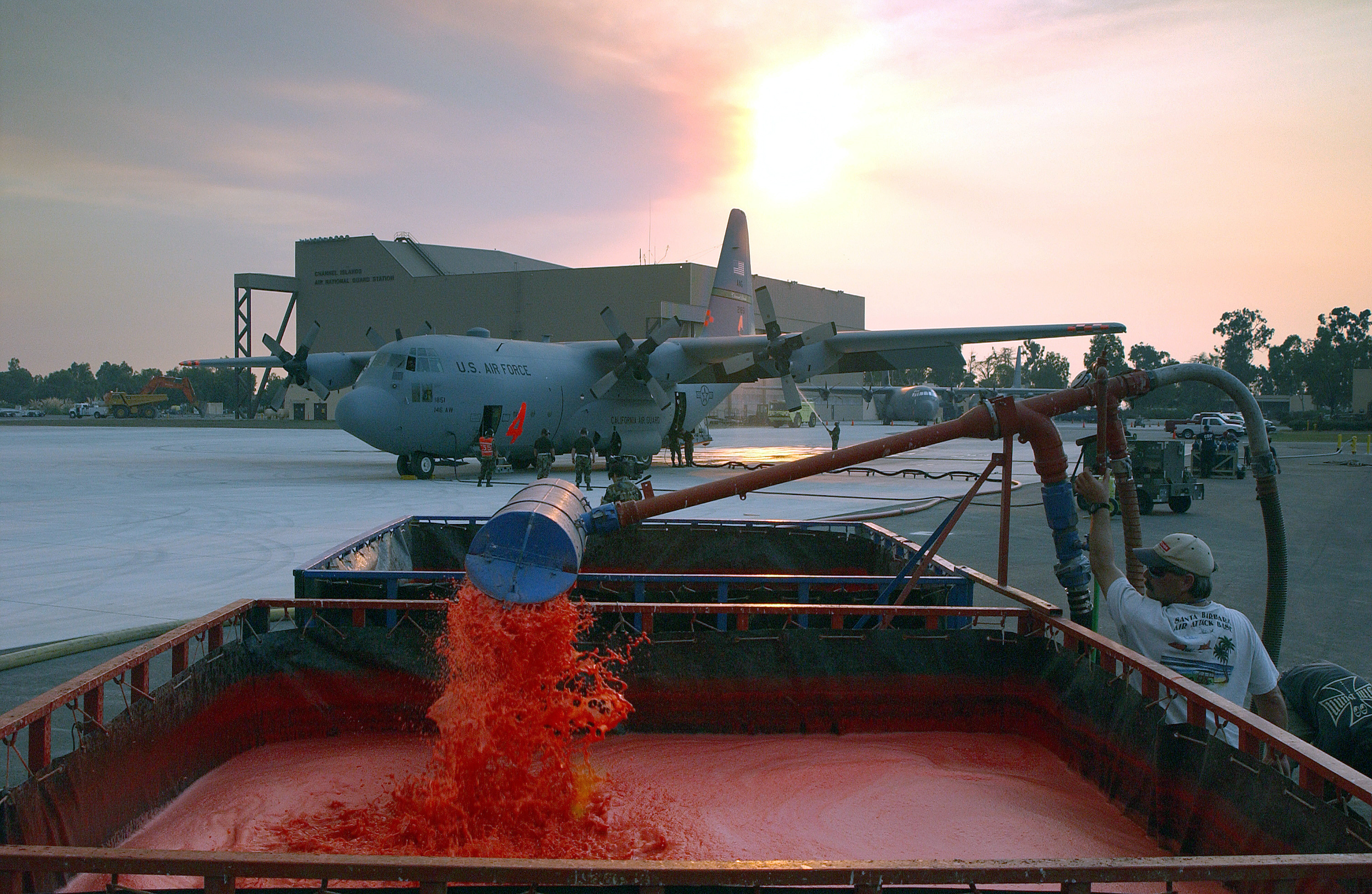
A Modular Airborne FireFighting System equipped C-130E Hercules from the 146th Airlift Wing is reloaded with Phos-Chek fire retardant to be dropped on the Simi Fire in Southern California on October 28, 2003.

Phos-Chek fire retardants are manufactured as dry powders or as concentrated liquids and diluted with water prior to use. The retardant is applied ahead of wildfires to homes and vegetation by ground crews and aerial firefighting units, either fixed-wing or rotary-wing aircraft. As of 2022, Phos-Chek LC-95A is the most used fire retardant in the world.

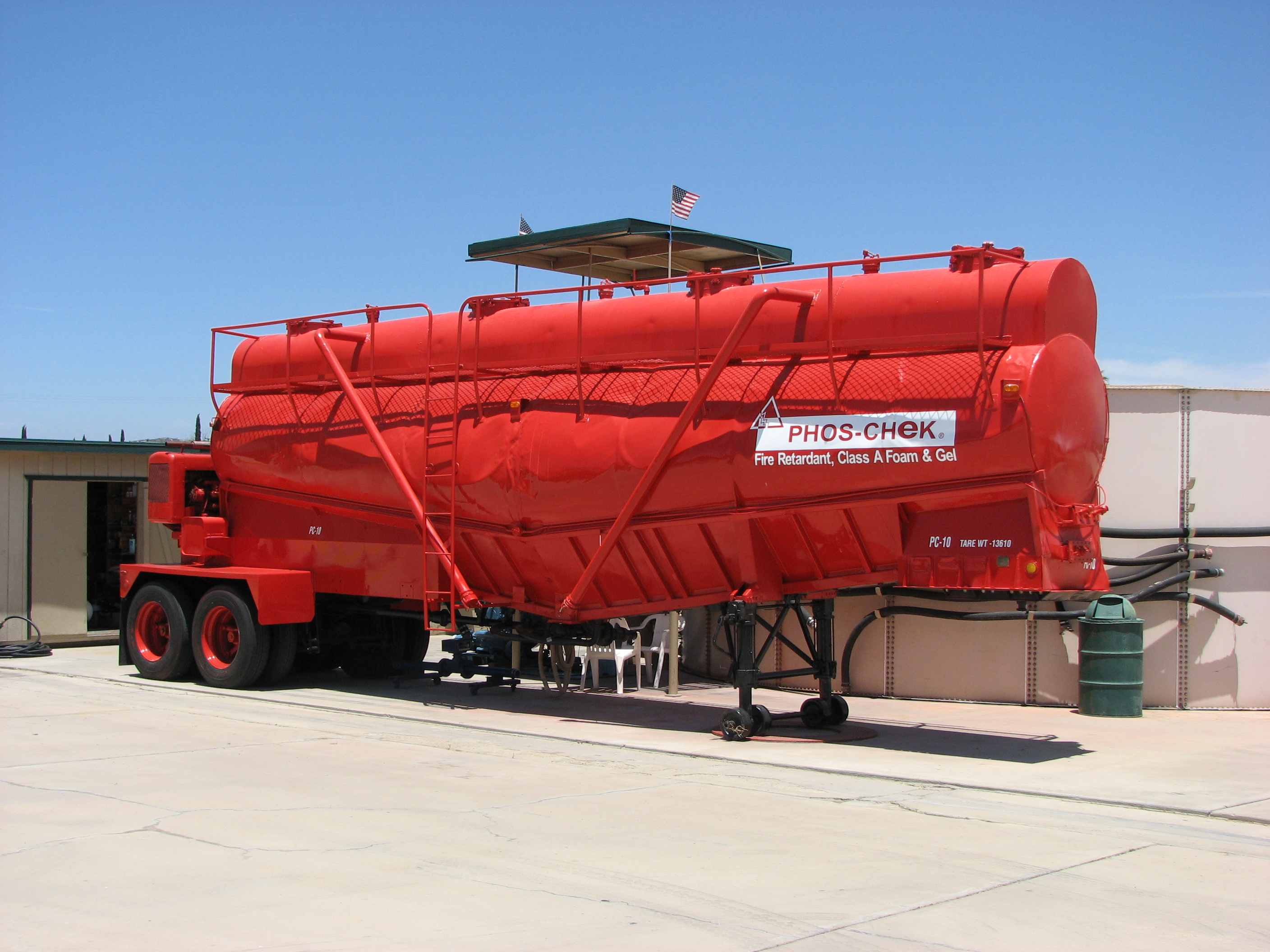
A Phos-Chek tank trailer at Ramona Airport

Phos-Chek is produced in several colors, including red, uncolored, and fugitive. The colored retardant gradually fades to an earth-tone when exposed to sunlight. The red color aids aircrews in targeting drops of retardant.

Some of the main components of Phos-Chek retardants include ammonium polyphosphate, diammonium phosphate, ammonium sulfate, ammonium dihydrogen phosphate, attapulgus clay, guar gum (or a derivative of guar gum), and trade secret performance additives. Fire retardants are manufactured as several different formulations with varying proportions of the above components.

=== Potential harms ===
Concerns have been raised that Phos-Chek harms fish and aquatic life; and that it causes long-term effects on soils, insects, and microbiology. A group based in Oregon called Forest Service Employees for Environmental Ethics sued the U.S. Forest Service (USFS), claiming the service violated the Clean Water Act by spraying Phos-Chek without assessing the product's harmful effects on waterways. In 2023, a Montana judge agreed that the USFS was violating the Clean Water Act but declined to prohibit the agency from using Phos-Chek, instead requiring the USFS to apply for a permit from the EPA but permitting USFS to continue using the product in the meantime.

The phosphate and sulfate salts act as fire retardants and prevent combustion of cellulosic materials. Phosphate can also act as a fertilizer once the fire danger has passed. Guar gum and clay are thickening agents to prevent dispersal of the retardant after it is dropped from the plane. Other ingredients include corrosion inhibitors and flow conditioners. Phos-Chek and other retardants based on ammonium phosphate may cause algae blooms in bodies of water when washed downstream and may increase the growth of invasive plant species.

=== Class A foam ===
Phos-Chek WD-881 is a mixture of anionic surfactants, foam stabilizers, and solvents, including hexylene glycol. As a fire-fighting foam, it is used as a short-term fire suppressant. It is also used as a long-term fire retardant: "A long-term fire retardant called PHOS-CHEK long-term fire retardant will be applied to vegetation and wooden structures (fences, sheds, etc.) around the residence and property to protect it from wildfire." "Long-term retardants are usually applied with air tankers and helicopters."

== History ==
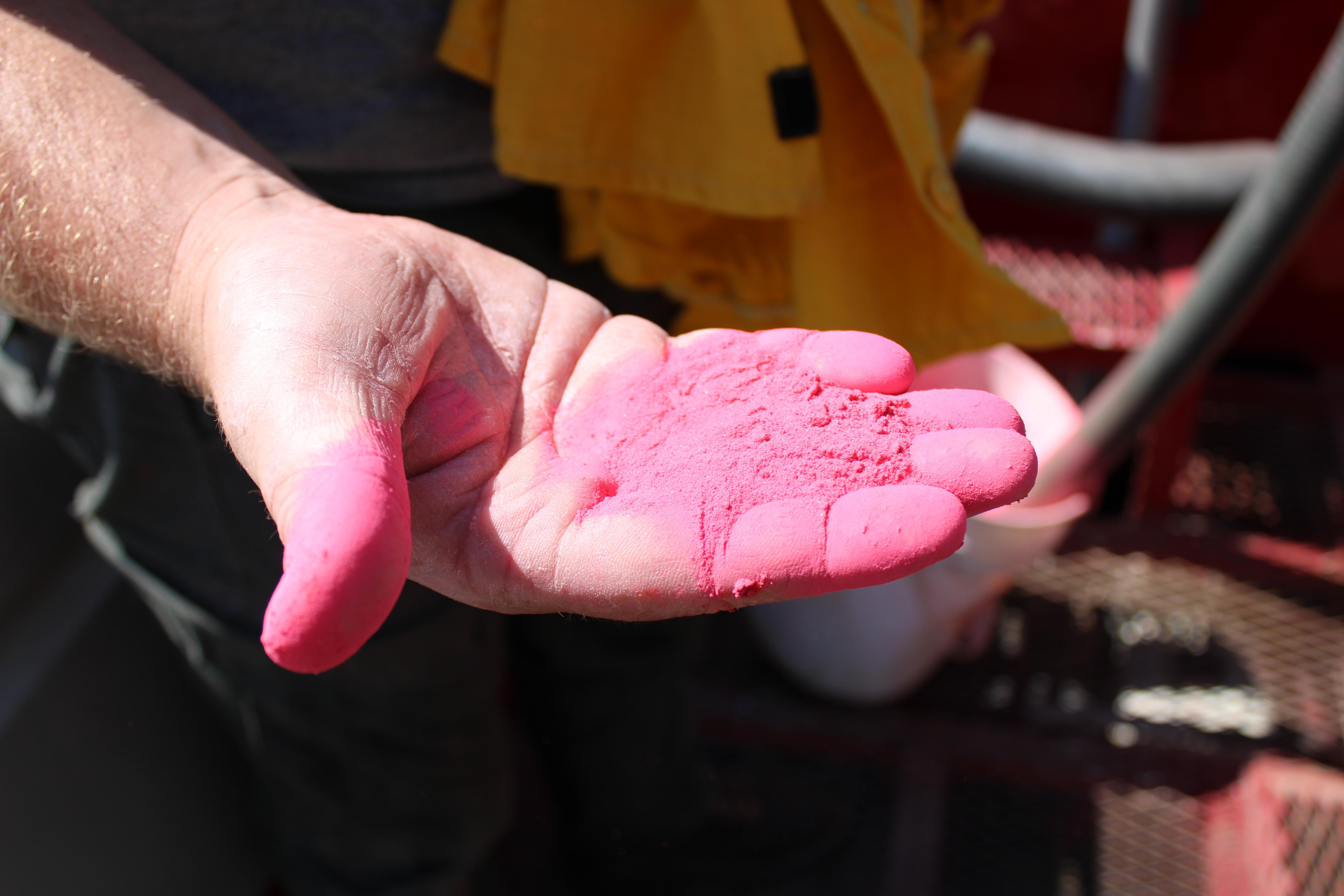
Phos-Chek prior to being mixed with water

The first Phos-Chek retardant product was available in 1962 and was the first phosphate-based fire retardant approved by the United States Forest Service. The Phos-Chek brand belonged to the Monsanto Company until 1998, when ownership was transferred to Solutia Inc. In 2000, Astaris LLC acquired the Phos-Chek name. In November 2005, Astaris LLC was acquired by Israel Chemicals Ltd. (ICL), and the Phos-Chek brand was renamed "Phos-Chek Fire Safety Group" and assigned to the Performance Products division of ICL (ICL PPLP). In 2018, private investment firm SK Capital acquired the Fire Safety and Oil Additives businesses of ICL and renamed it Perimeter Solutions, and the Phos-Chek brand was acquired with the business.

== Manufacturing ==
The Airbase Service Center, located in Post Falls, Idaho supports all bulk bases (equipment and product support to agency-operated bases), SEAT bases (equipment and product support for Single Engine Air Tanker Bases), and Portable Base Operations (mobile rotor and fixed-wing bases). Various equipment maintenance and base rebuilds are performed from this location. Fabrication of liquid concentrate tanks, batch mixers, hopper units, and various other equipment is performed from this location.
