= PhostrEx =

PhostrEx is a fire suppression agent developed for use in aviation applications to replace halon, a greenhouse gas (GHG). It was developed by Eclipse Aviation for use aboard their Eclipse 500 very light jets as an engine fire suppression system, and is now being marketed to other aviation manufacturers.

== Overview ==
The PhostrEx fire suppression system addresses many of the problems with halons, from system weight to environmental concerns. These concerns, including halon's ozone-depleting and global warming characteristics, prompted the Montreal Protocol to outlaw its use. The only exception allowed by this international treaty was in aviation applications, and only until a suitable replacement became available.

PhostrEx meets the requirements of both the Montreal Protocol and the Clean Air Act, and is the first commercially viable Federal Aviation Administration and United States Environmental Protection Agency certified halon replacement fire extinguishing agent. The EPA awarded the company with a 2007 Stratospheric Ozone Protection Award for the development of its PhostrEx fire-suppression system.

PhostrEx reacts very quickly with atmospheric moisture, breaking down into phosphorus acid and hydrogen bromide. Neither of these harms the ozone layer. High concentrations of PhostrEx can cause skin blistering and eye irritation, however low concentrations are typically used due to its effectiveness.

Any persons with skin or eye contact with PhostrEx should rinse the affected area with water as soon as possible. PhostrEx is not very corrosive to metals, but it can tarnish.

Spectrum Aeronautical will incorporate the PhostrEx fire suppression system into its future aircraft.

== Problems with halon ==
Most fire extinguishing agents pose a corrosion hazard to aircraft. The extinguishing effect of Halon is through interference of the thermal balance of the flame, and to a small extent by interfering with the chemical reaction of the fire. Halons are chlorofluorocarbons which cause damage to the ozone layer. It is being phased out for environmentally friendlier alternatives. However, most of these alternatives will not fit in an aircraft engine.

Halon is mildly toxic in confined spaces.

== Strengths ==
- More effective than halon by weight
- Less weight by system
- Lower maintenance costs
- Environmentally friendly
- FAA certified
- EPA certified

== Weaknesses ==
- In the presence of moisture, phosphorus tribromide is highly corrosive to most metals except lead and nickel.
- while applied during ground operation, it can harm passenger or fire fighter
- Proprietary system

== See also ==
- Phosphorus tribromide
