= Fire-retardant gel =

Superabsorbent polymer mixture

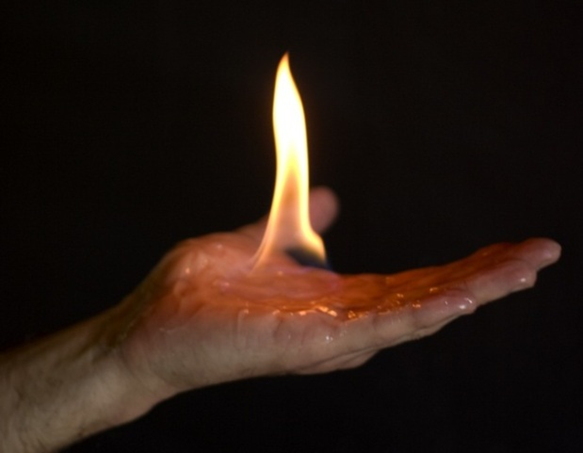
Fire-retardant gel protects a person's hand from a burning fuel.

Fire-retardant gels are superabsorbent polymer slurries with a "consistency almost like petroleum jelly." Fire-retardant gels can also be slurries that are composed of a combination of water, starch, and clay. Used as fire retardants, they can be used for structure protection and in direct-attack applications against wildfires.

Fire-retardant gels are short-term fire suppressants typically applied with ground equipment. They are also used in the movie industry to protect stunt persons from flames when filming action movie scenes.

== History ==
The practical use of gels was limited until the 1950s as advances in copolymerization techniques led to reproducible, batchwise preparation of swellable resins with uniform cross-linking. This technology was later used in the development of a "substantially continuous, adherent, particulate coating composition of water-swollen, gelled particles of a crosslinked, water-insoluble, water-swellable polymer."

The water-absorbent polymers in fire-retardant gels are similar to those used in diapers.

== Mechanism of retardation ==
The polymer in gels soaks up hundreds of times its weight in water creating millions of tiny drops of water surrounded by and protected by a polymer shell. The result is a "bubblet" or a drop of water surrounded by a polymer shell in contrast to a bubble which is air surrounded by liquid. As the gel and water are sprayed onto an exposed surface, millions of tiny "bubblets" are stacked one on top of another. The stacking of the water "bubblets" form a thermal protective "blanket" over the surface to which it is applied. In order for the heat of the fire to penetrate the protected surface, it must burn off each layer of the gel "bubblets" coating. Each layer holds the heat away from the next layer of bubblets beneath. The polymer shell of each bubblets and their stacking significantly prevent water evaporation.

The stacking of the bubblets is similar to aspirated fire fighting foam or compressed air foam systems, except that bubblets are water filled, whereas foam bubbles are only filled with air. Due to the high specific heat of water, it requires more energy to raise the temperature of water than air. Therefore, water-filled bubblets will absorb more heat than the air-filled foam bubbles (which are more effective for vapor suppression). When gel is applied to a surface such as an exterior wall, the water-filled bubblets can absorb much of the heat given off by the fire, thereby slowing the fire from reaching the wall.

Gels can provide thermal protection from fire for extended periods even at 3,500 °F (1,930 °C). Depending on the fire conditions, applied fire-retardant gels offer fire protection for periods of 6 to 36 hours.

After the retained water is completely evaporated from a gel, fire resistance is lost, but can be restored by re-wetting the surface if gel material is still adherent.

== Uses ==
Fire-retardant gels create a fire protective gel coating that completely repels flaming embers and is extremely effective in cases of emergency in protecting structures from the flame fronts typical of most wildfires.

During a fire in the Black Hills National Forest, "nearly all homes coated with a slimy gel were saved while dozens of houses nearby burned to the ground."

Certain supplemental fire protection insurance may include the application of fire-retardant gel to homes during wildfire. Claimed to work "best when applied hours before a fire approaches", gel is applied using specially designed trucks by private firms. However, danger may be high and private firms may interfere with fire efforts. In response to such a concern, Sam DiGiovanna, chief of Firebreak response program, a private response team, stated: "If whoever is running the fire thinks it's too dangerous to go into a particular area, we don't go into that area."

These gels are useful when filming scenes in which it is desired to give the illusion that someone is on fire. To do so, the gel is applied to an area of the body. Next, a fuel is placed on top of the gel. When ready to film the scene, the fuel is lit on fire. The gel insulates the person from the energy released from the burning fuel. The energy from the burning fuel goes into the gel, but not the stunt person. Thus, the stunt person is protected from being burned.
