= Modular Airborne FireFighting System =

Military firefighting equipment

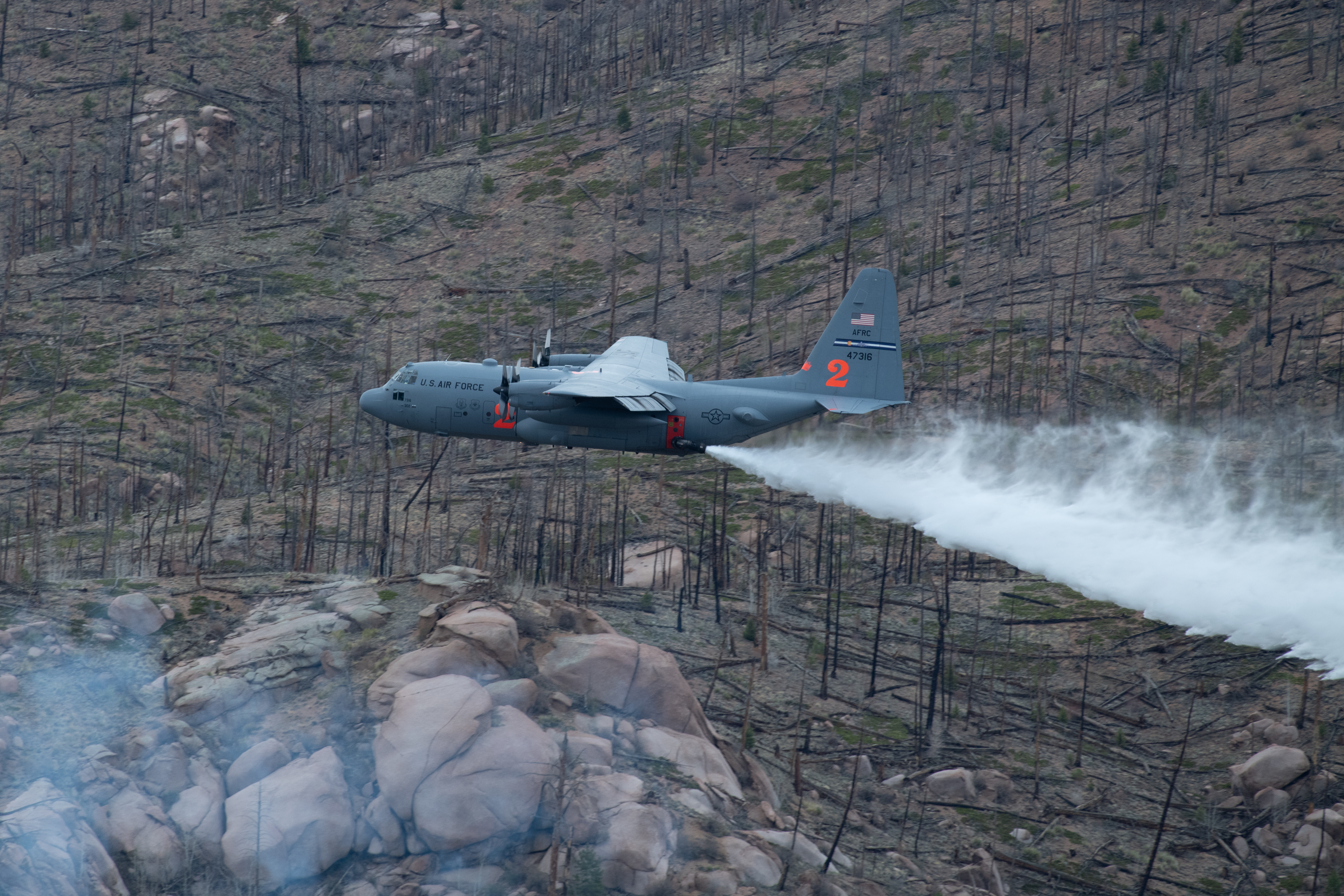
A MAFFS II-equipped C-130 Hercules from the 302nd Airlift Wing drops water over the Hayman Fire burn scar during training in May 2021.

The Modular Airborne FireFighting System (MAFFS) is a self-contained unit used for aerial firefighting that can be loaded onto both military cargo transport Lockheed C-130 Hercules and Embraer C-390 Millennium, which then allows the aircraft to be used as an air tanker against wildfires. This allows the U.S. Forest Service (USFS) to use military aircraft from the Air National Guard and Air Force Reserve to serve as an emergency backup resource to the civilian air tanker fleet.

== Development ==
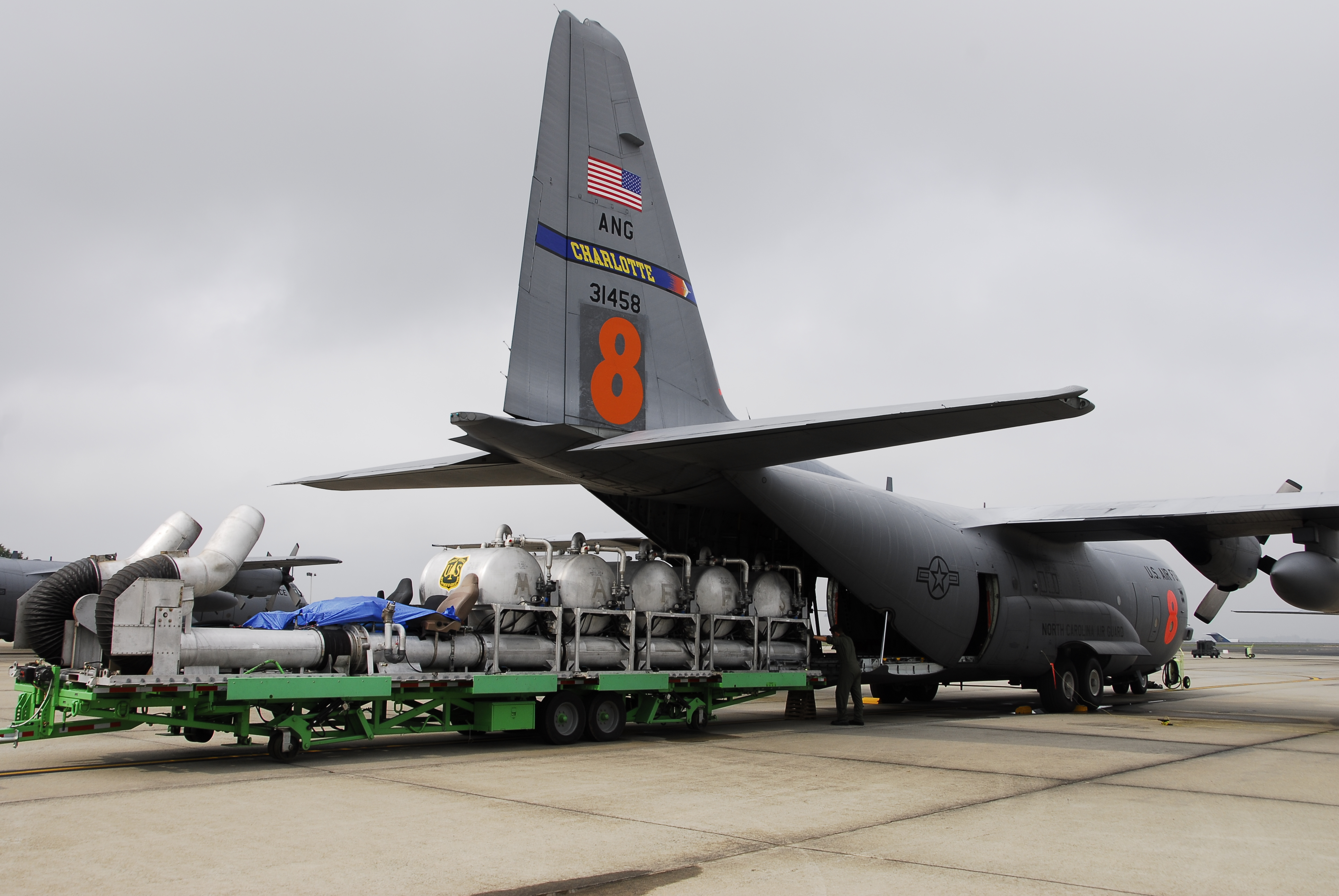
MAFFS I unit about to be loaded into a C-130 in North Carolina in 2008.

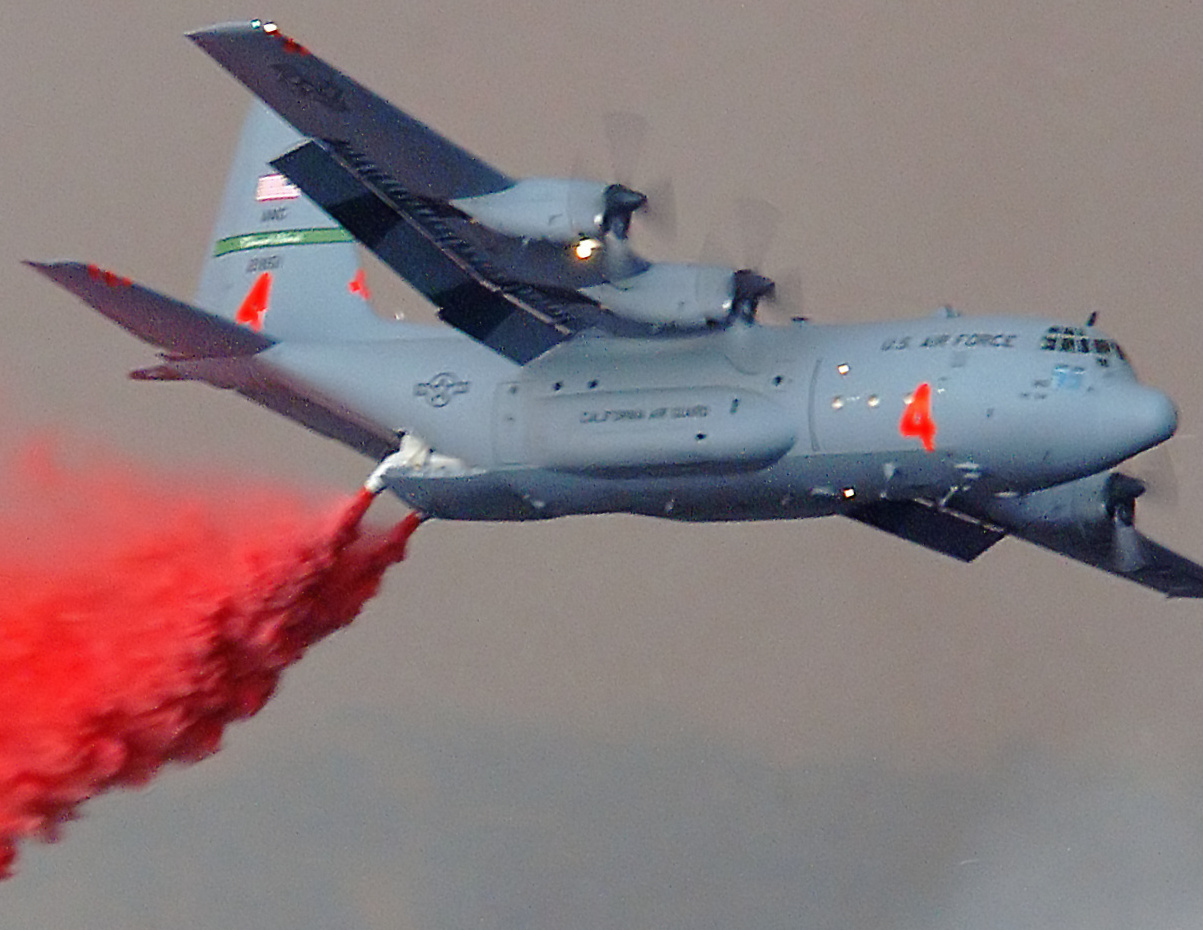
MAFFS I deploys retardant; the discharge pipes on the cargo door can be seen.

Congress established the MAFFS program after the 1970 Laguna Fire overwhelmed the existing aviation firefighting resources. The USFS was directed to develop a program in cooperation with the Air National Guard and Air Force Reserve to produce the equipment, training and operational procedures to integrate military air tankers into the national response system. The Engineered Systems Division of FMC Corporation (Santa Clara, CA) was contracted to design, build and test the modular tank system that would enable a standard C-130 to be quickly converted into a tanker. Initial flight tests with a prototype two-tank installation began in July 1971. Subsequent systems were fabricated by Aero Union of Chico, California.

The MAFFS consists of a series of five pressurized fire retardant tanks with a total capacity of 2,700 US gallons (10,000 L; 2,200 imp gal) and associated equipment which is palletized and carried in the aircraft's cargo bay. In addition to the retardant tanks, each module contains a pressure tank where compressed air is stored at 82.7 bar (1200 psi). The control module includes the master control panel, the loadmaster's seat, and discharge valves. An air compressor module provides air pressure for charging the system; it stays at the airtanker base during air operations and is used to recharge the system between runs. Each unit weighs about 11,000 pounds (5,000 kg). It can be installed in any C-130E or H equipped with the USAF 463L cargo-handling system.

Air tankers are categorized by their retardant capacity, and although the MAFFS capacity is just under 3,000 US gallons (11,000 L; 2,500 imp gal), a MAFFS C-130 is considered a Type 1 air tanker, which is the largest class. Retardant exits through two tubes which extend out the plane's aft cargo bay doors. The system can disperse all 10,220 L (2,700 gal) in five seconds over a fire, producing a fire line that is 60 feet (18 m) wide and a quarter mile (400 m) long. It can then be reloaded in eight minutes. Maffs Corp. is a combination of two aftermarket support companies, United Aeronautical Corporation and Blue Aerospace.

=== MAFFS II ===
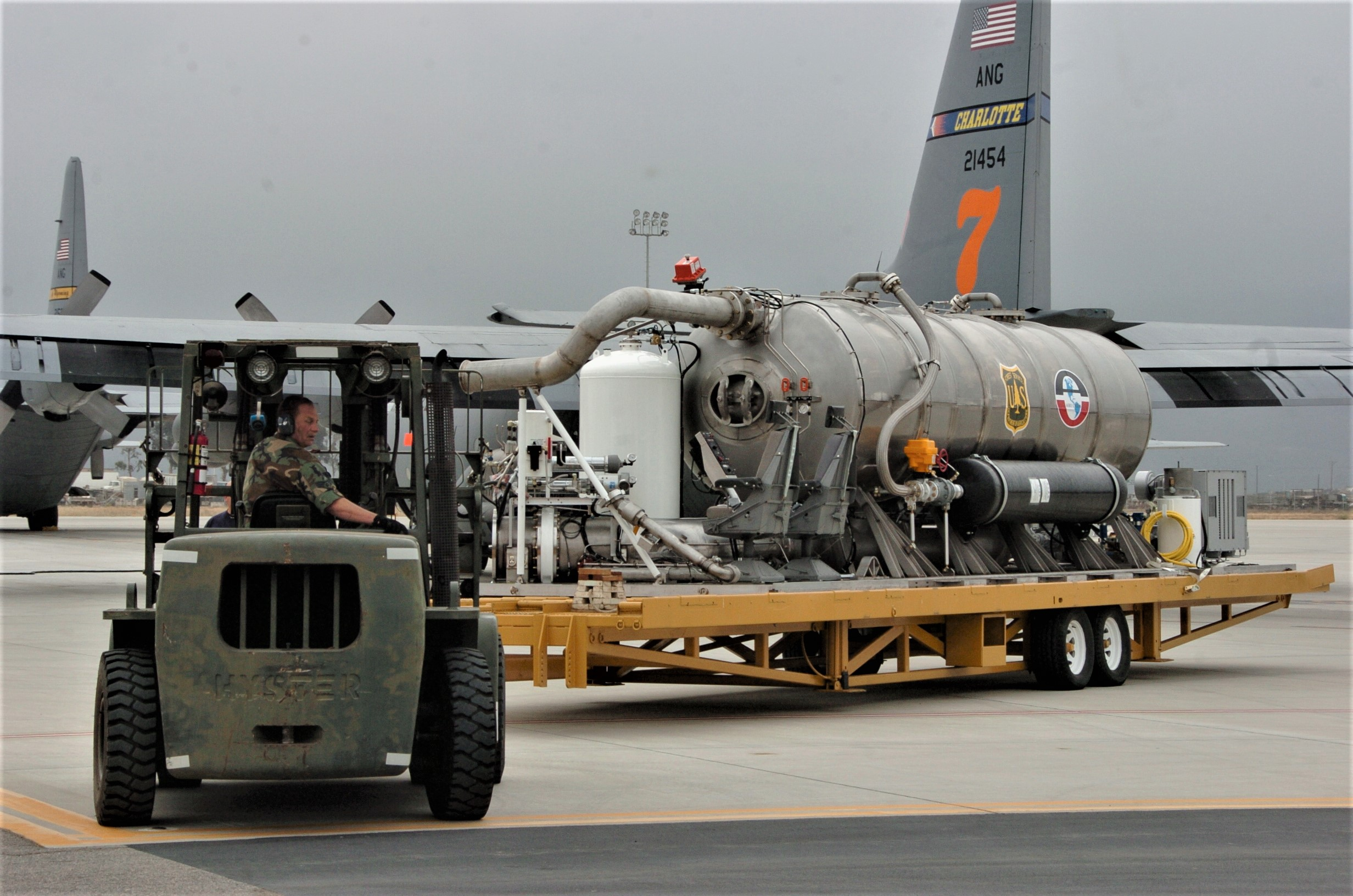
MAFFS II on display

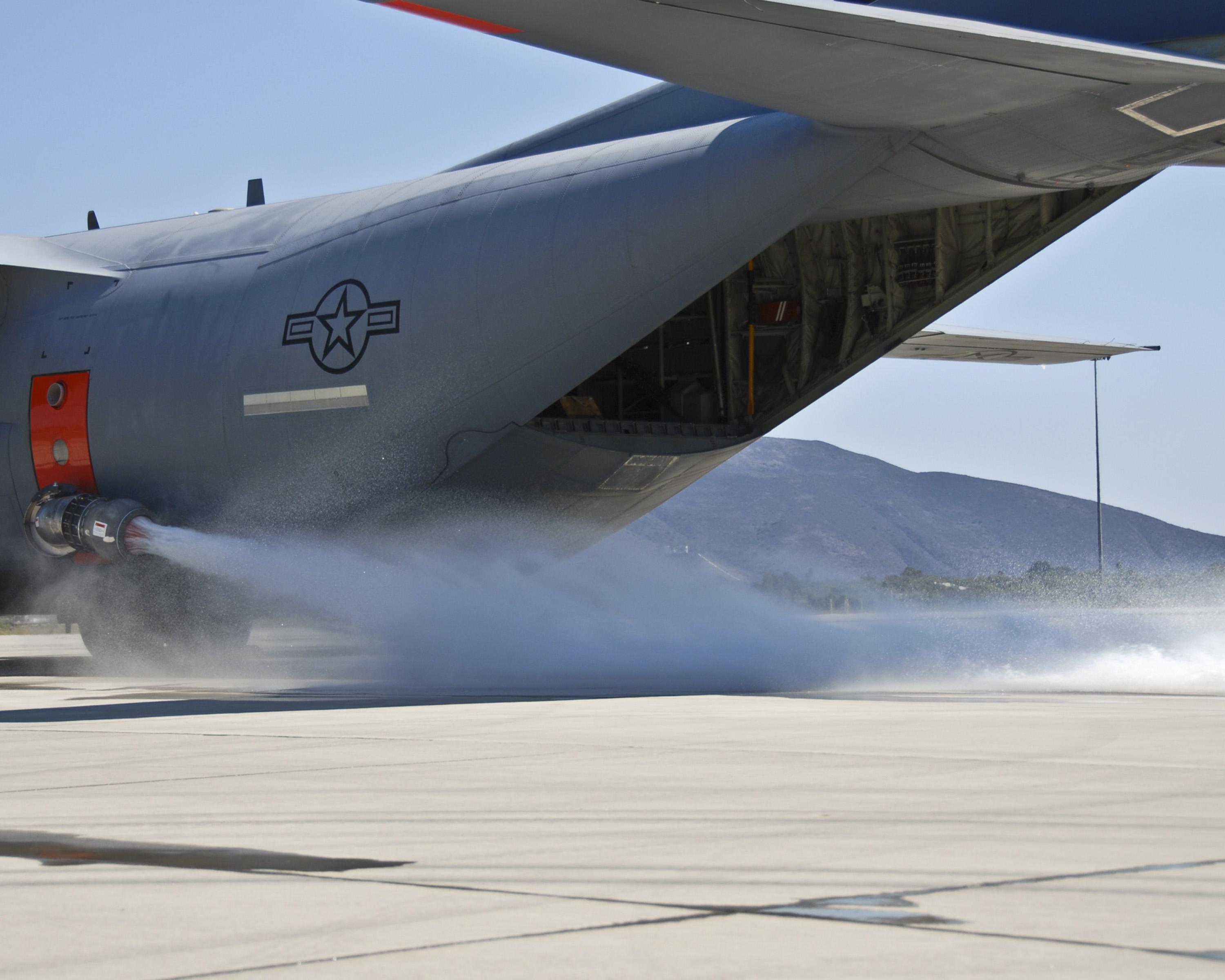
MAFFS II being tested; the discharge pipes in the paratroop drop doors can be seen

Aero Union, under contract to the USFS, has developed an improved version of the system, known as the MAFFS II. The new system has a capacity of up to 3,000 US gallons (11,000 L; 2,500 imp gal), replacing the five retardant tanks with one large tank, and has two on-board air compressors. The original MAFFS has to be pressurized by a compressor on the ground as a part of the loading process. The ability to pressurize the system in the air cuts turn-around time significantly. The new system discharges the retardant through a special plug in the paratroop drop door on the side of the aircraft, rather than requiring the cargo ramp door to be opened; this allows the aircraft to remain pressurized during the drop sequence. Far more significantly, the cargo ramp and door can remain closed, cutting drag considerably, and thereby allowing a greater performance margin than available with MAFFS I.

Aero Union delivered the first production unit to the USFS in July 2007, and was flight tested during August. MAFFS II was used for the first time on a fire in July 2008, when a crew from the 302d Airlift Wing launched from McClellan Tanker Base in California on an operational test using a C-130H.

== Operations ==
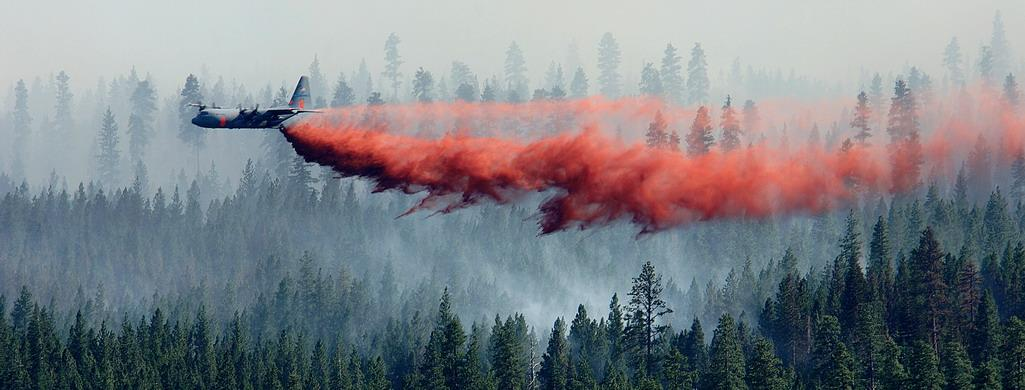
MAFFS I drop, Black Crater, Oregon, July 2006

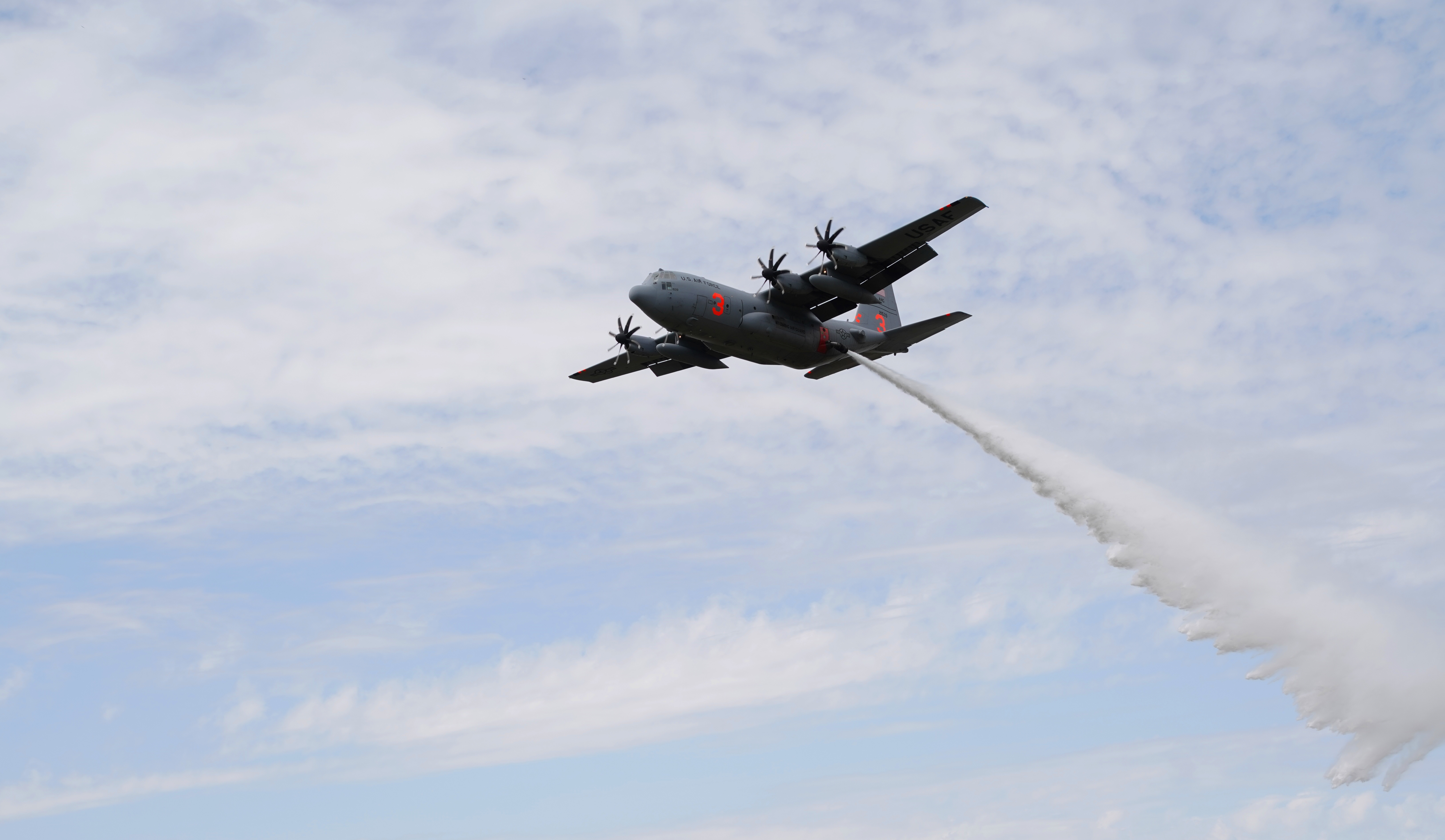
View of a MAFFS II drop from a C-130H by the 153rd Airlift Wing during MAFFS training at Gowen Field, Boise, Idaho, April 27, 2022

MAFFS equipment is stationed at eight locations around the United States. They are considered a "24-hour resource", meaning that when activated, it is expected that it will take 24 hours for the aircraft to arrive on scene, as the C-130s have to be pulled from their regular military duties and fitted with the MAFFS equipment. When needed, regional foresters can request a MAFFS activation after they have ascertained that all available commercial air tankers are assigned to on-going incidents or committed to an initial attack. The National Interagency Coordination Center at the National Interagency Fire Center (NIFC), Boise, Idaho, can activate the MAFFS when all other contract airtankers are committed to incidents or initial attack or are otherwise unable to meet requests for air operations. The request for MAFFS activation is approved by the national MAFFS liaison officer, who is the Forest Service director at NIFC. This request is then forwarded to the joint director of military support at the Pentagon. Governors of states where National Guard MAFFS units are stationed may activate MAFFS for missions within their state boundaries when covered by a memorandum of understanding with the military authority and the Forest Service.

During the 1994 fire season, one of the worst during that decade, the four airlift wings equipped with MAFFS flew nearly 2,000 missions and dropped 51,000,000 pounds (23,000,000 kg) of retardant. In 2004, after all the large civilian tankers in the U.S. had been grounded due to safety concerns, MAFFS-equipped C-130s were pre-positioned in western states in anticipation of wildfires. Besides use on U.S. fires, MAFFS has been deployed to Mexico, Europe, Africa and Indonesia. International deployment is initiated by a foreign government's request through the U.S. State Department.

MAFFS were deployed in the Palisades Fire by the California Air National Guard in January 2025.

The military is reimbursed for the cost of operating MAFFS flights by the agency having jurisdiction over the fire.

MAFFS is in use in the Colombian Air Force, Brazilian Air Force, Royal Moroccan Air Force and the Royal Thai Air Force C-130s. It was also formerly used in the Portuguese Air Force C-130s.

== Accidents ==
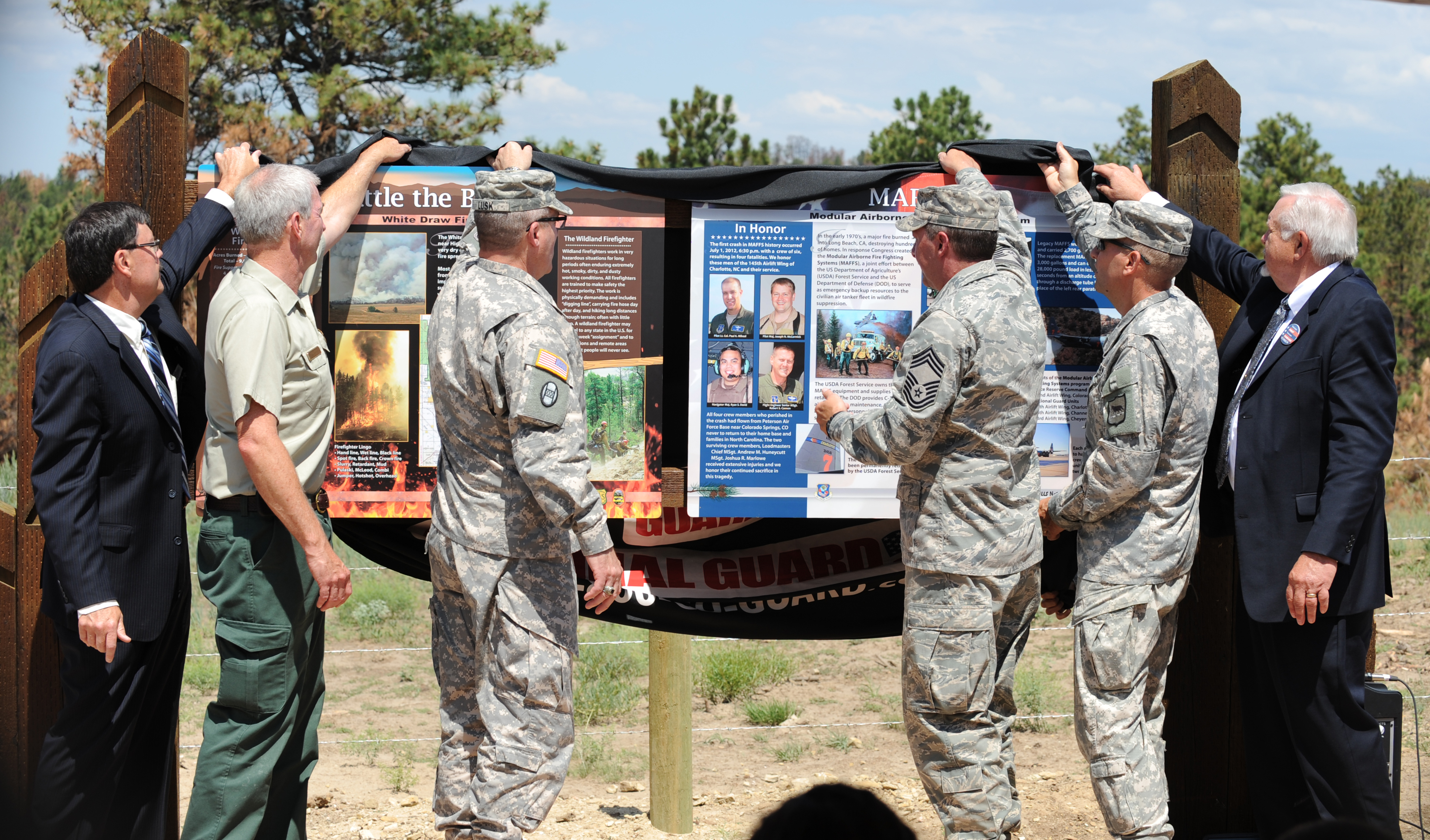
Honoring the airmen of the North Carolina Air National Guard C-130 aircraft that crashed while fighting the White Draw Fire

On July 1, 2012, C-130H3 callsign MAFFS #7 T/A 93-1458, which belonged to the North Carolina Air National Guard's 145th Airlift Wing based at the Charlotte-Douglas International Airport, crashed while fighting the White Draw Fire in South Dakota's Black Hills. Four of the six crew aboard the C-130 Hercules died.

== Operators ==
Current operators

- Brazil: MAFFS I operated until 2024 and MAFFS II used by the Brazilian Air Force on their Embraer C-390 Millennium;
- Canada: MAFFS II used by the Coulson Aviation;
- Colombia: MAFFS II used by the Colombian Air Force;
- Tunisia: MAFFS II used by the Tunisian Air Force;
- United States:
  - MAFFS II used by the United States Air Force;
  - MAFFS II used by the California Department of Forestry and Fire Protection.

Former operators

- Greece: MAFFS I used by the Hellenic Air Force;
- Italy: MAFFS I used by the Italian Air Force;
- Morocco: MAFFS I used by the Royal Moroccan Air Force;
- Portugal: MAFFS I used by the Portuguese Air Force until the 90's. Two MAFFS II ordered in 2025;
- Thailand: MAFFS I used by the Royal Thai Air Force;
- Turkey: MAFFS I used by the Turkish Air Force.

== See also ==
- Wildland fire suppression
- Phos-Chek fire retardant
