= Aero Union =

Firefighting aircraft operation company

Aero Union Corporation
- Type: Private
- Industry: Aviation
- Founded: 1961; 65 years ago
- Founder: Dale Newton and Dick Foy
- Defunct: 2011; 15 years ago
- Headquarters: Chico, CA, USA
- Key people: Terry Unsworth, President Brett Gourley, CEO
- Website: http://www.aerounion.com/ (defunct)

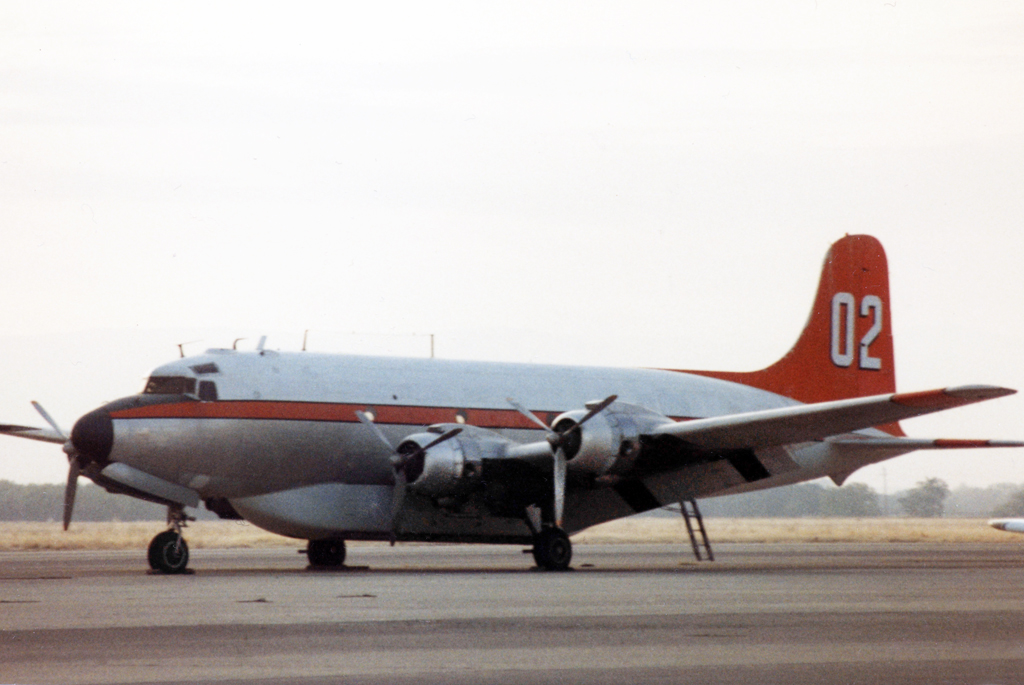
Douglas C-54 Tanker 02 of Aero Union at Chico in 1992

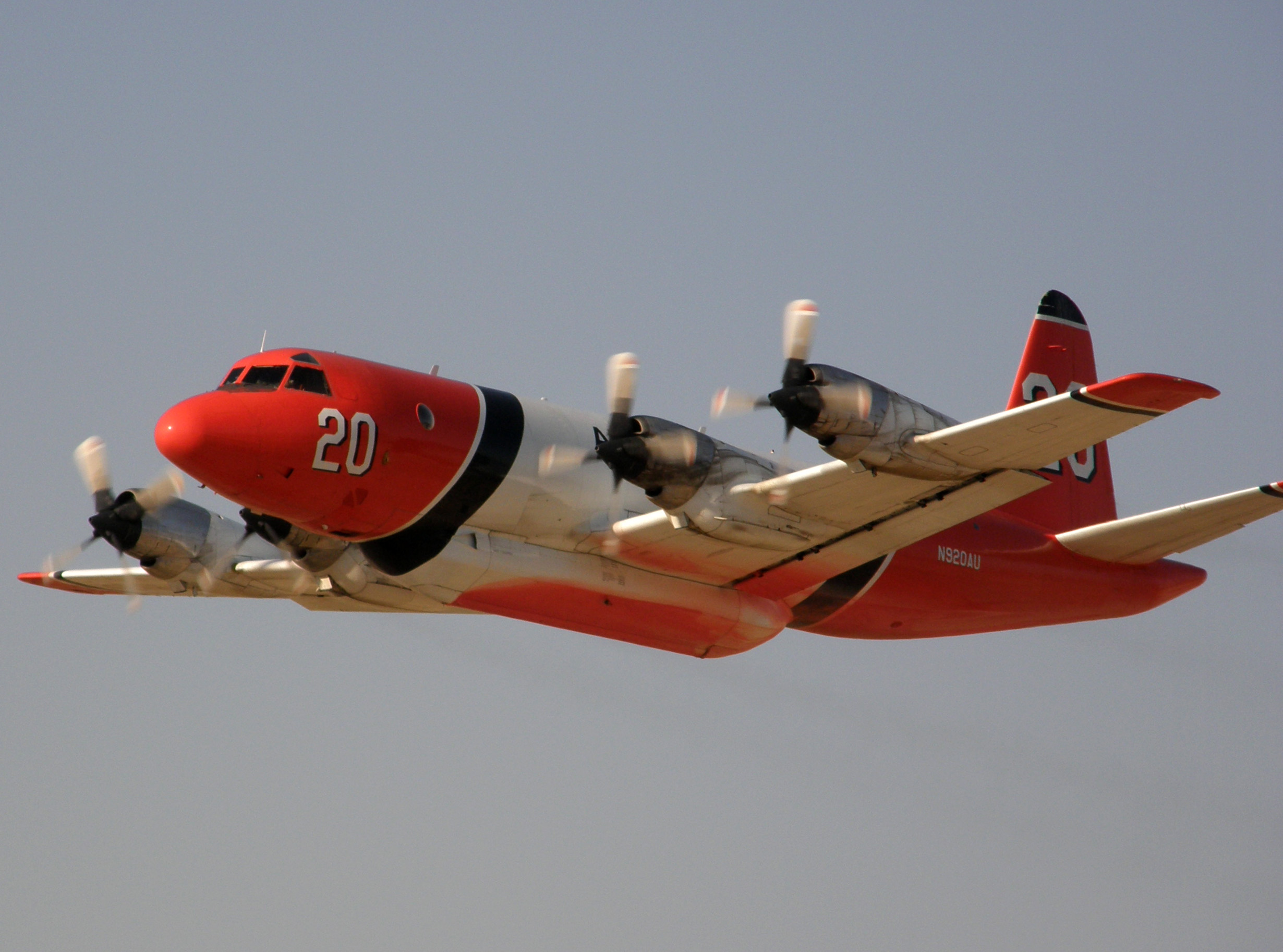
Aero Union P-3A Orion taking off from Fox Field, Lancaster, California, to fight the Neola North Fire (North Fire 2007).

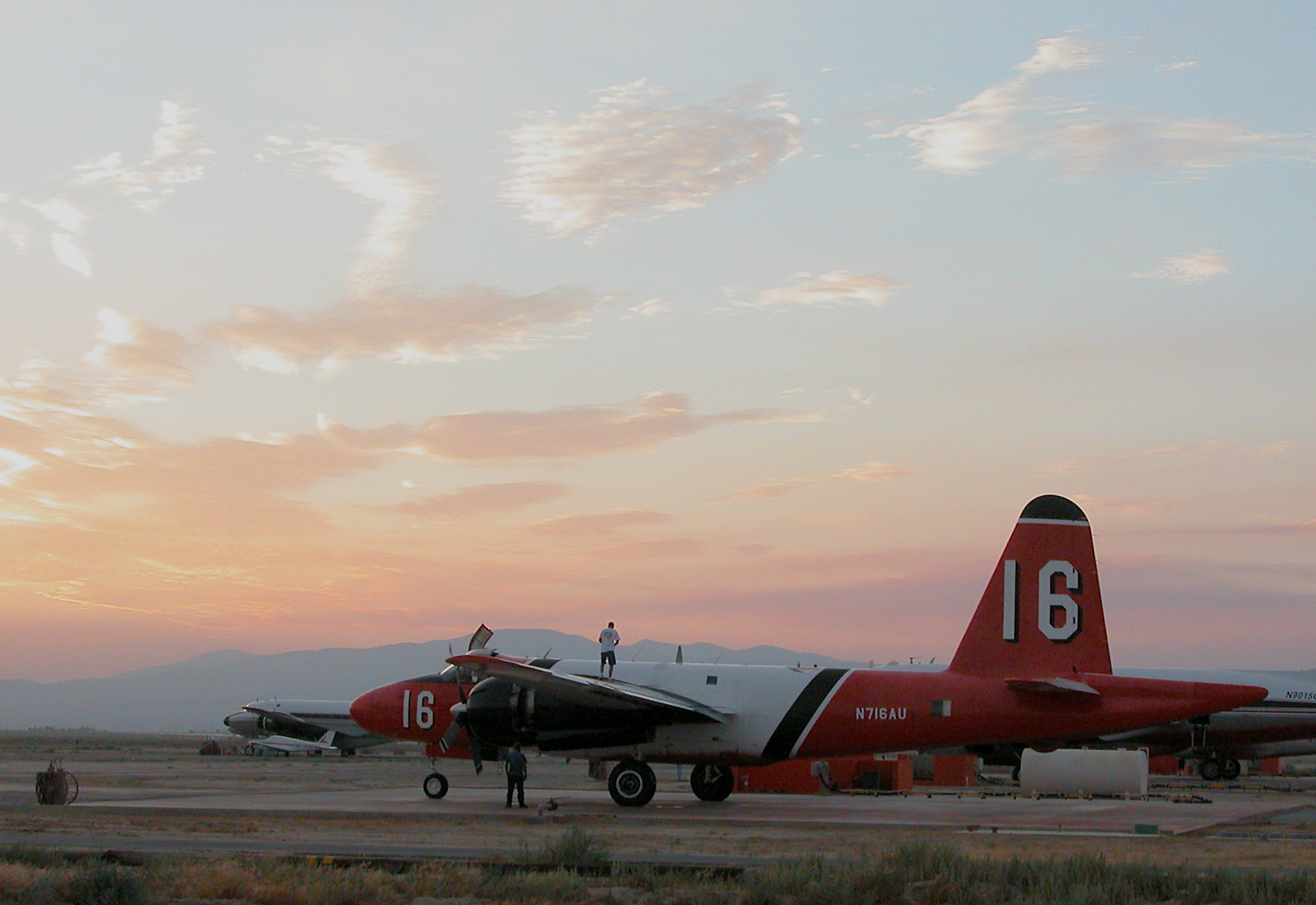
Aero Union P-2 Tanker 16 at Fox Field in 2003, without jet engines

Aero Union Corporation was an aircraft operation and maintenance company based in Chico, California, United States. It was known for operating aerial firefighting aircraft, training crews and making custom designed firefighting systems tailored to specific aircraft requirements. After years of controversies regarding the operation of the company and the safety of its aircraft, the U.S. Forest Service (USFS) canceled its contract, and the company was forced to shut down soon after.

== History ==
In 1960 Dale Newton and Dick Foy participated in their first fire season with a surplus B-25 Mitchell. Newton & Foy operated for that season under the name Western Air Industries. The following year they purchased their first two B-17 Flying Fortresses and changed their name to Aero Union. In 1962, the company moved their operations from Redding, California to Chico. Between 1975 and 2000, the company used Douglas C-54 aircraft as tankers and as general support aircraft, nine being in use in April 1990.

== Move from Chico ==
In June 2010, Aero Union announced plans to move the majority of its operations to McClellan Airfield (formerly McClellan Air Force Base) just outside Sacramento. Reasons stated for the move include needing larger, more consolidated facilities, access to a larger labor pool and being closer to its primary customers. A smaller scale Chico operation continued to be maintained for several months to provide additional storage and flexibility. The relocation began in September 2010 but ended abruptly with the closure of the company.

=== Airtanker scandal ===
Aero Union was one of six contractors involved in the U.S. Forest Service airtanker scandal. The aging U.S. C-119 Flying Boxcar firefighting fleet, including some Aero Union aircraft, was grounded in 1987 due to safety concerns; this greatly reduced the USFS's aerial firefighting capability. To quickly replace retired aircraft and modernize, the USFS organized a deal with the Department of Defense and the General Services Administration to exchange the grounded planes for more modern C-130A Hercules and P-3 Orion aircraft. The exchange program eventually allowed the contractors to acquire twenty-eight aircraft at no cost, but an absence of publicity or a public bid process led to accusations of cronyism, and the exchange was illegally carried out by the USFS: instead of merely allowing contractors to operate government-owned aircraft as per the interagency agreement, many titles were transferred, effectively giving aircraft away for free. At least four such aircraft were dismantled for parts by Aero Union and TBM. Aero Union also exchanged other planes with the USFS, with the government retaining the titles and ownership, and was required to maintain and operate them for firefighting duties. Instead, Aero Union dismantled some of them, selling parts for profit. Aero Union made an out of court settlement with the government over its actions but this was later challenged in court.

=== Closure ===
On July 29, 2011, the U.S. Forest Service announced that it had canceled its six-plane contract with Aero Union after the company's planes failed their required safety inspections. In April 2011 Aero Union had voluntarily disclosed that its planes were not current on inspections and were in violation of the contract. The contract, worth about $30 million a year, made up about 95% of the company's income. Less than a month later Aero Union informed its employees that they were out of work and that the company was shutting down operations. That August Aero Union failed to make its lease payments to the City of Chico and the lease was declared invalid by the city that September due to concerns that the city would be unable to re-lease the facilities if they became tied up in bankruptcy proceedings. Reduced to a staff of 5 people after the last round of layoffs, down from approximately 230 in 2008, CEO Brett Gourley claimed “The company is in sort of hibernation mode” and was looking for other sources of income. Aero Union has since completely shutdown all of its facilities, websites and other points of contact and is assumed to be out of business. In February 2012 PMI held an auction of Aero Union's aircraft assets, including 8 P-3 Orion aircraft, various spare parts and their intellectual property (MAFFS II and FIREHAWK firefighting systems). Only two aircraft were bid upon and those bids were rejected as being too low. In May 2012 another auction of tools and equipment, but no aircraft, parts or intellectual property, went through with the majority of it selling. Former Aero Union Tanker 23 acquired by Airstrike Firefighters, with plans for 6 more P-3's.

== MAFFS II ==
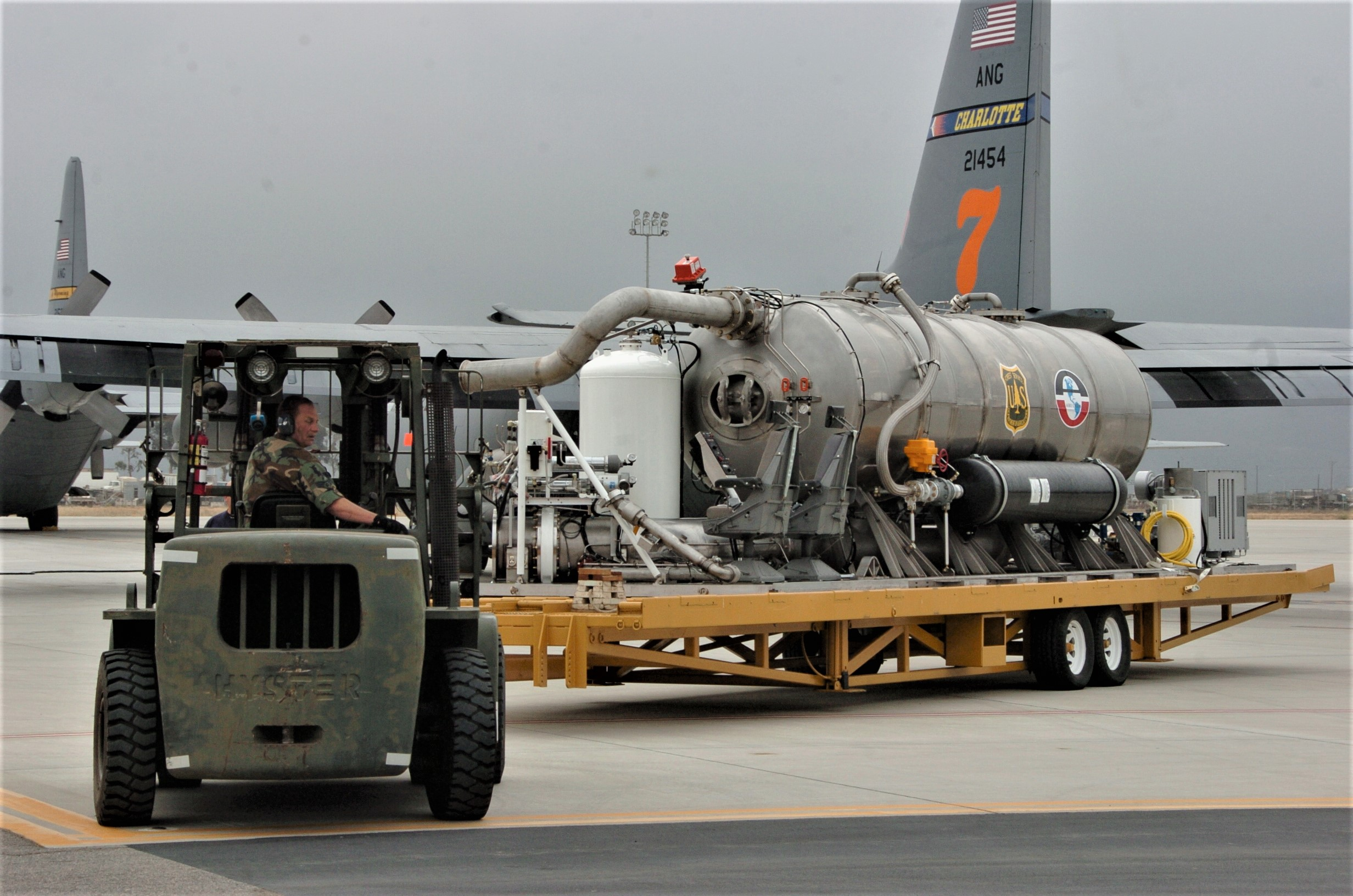
A MAFFS II tank on display in 2008

One of the company's last projects was an improved version of the Modular Airborne FireFighting System under contract to the USFS. Originally designed for C-130J model aircraft and later modified to fit on C-130H models, the new MAFFS II system has a capacity of up to 3,400 gallons, replacing the five retardant tanks with one large tank, and has an on-board air compressor. The original MAFFS has to be pressurized by a compressor on the ground as a part of the loading process. The ability to pressurize the system in the air cuts turn-around time, but adds substantial weight. The new system discharges the retardant through a special plug in the paratroop drop door on the side of the aircraft, rather than requiring the cargo ramp door to be opened; this allows the aircraft to remain pressurized during the drop sequence.

Aero Union delivered the first production unit to the USFS in July, 2007, with flight testing that following August. MAFFS II was used for the first time on a fire in July 2010.

== Aircraft fleet ==
- Lockheed P-3 Orion
- Lockheed P-2 Neptune
- Douglas DC-4/C-54
- North American Aviation B-25 Mitchell
- Boeing B-17 Flying Fortress
- Grumman S-2 Tracker
- Douglas A-26 Invader
- Grumman TBM Avenger
- Grumman AF-2S Guardian
- Fairchild C-119 Flying Boxcar
- Douglas DC-6
- Douglas DC-7
- Aero Spacelines Mini Guppy

== See also ==
- List of defunct airlines of the United States
- Aerial firefighting

== Bibliography ==
- Roach J. and Eastwood A.B. (2007). Piston Engined Airliner Production List. The Aviation Hobby Shop. ASIN B00AGFSJCK.
- Wheeler, Tony (1990). Airline Fleets 1990. Air-Britain (Historians Ltd). ISBN 0-85130-182-7.
