= Ammonium polyphosphate =

Names
- Other names: Exolit AP 422; FR CROS 484; CS FR APP 231

Identifiers
CAS Number	68333-79-9
ChEBI	CHEBI:147408
ECHA InfoCard	100.063.425
E number	E452(v) (thickeners, ...)
CompTox Dashboard (EPA)	DTXSID3097842

Properties
Chemical formula	H(NH_{4}PO_{3})_{n}OH
Molar mass	97.01 g/mol
Appearance	white powder
Density	1,9 g/cm^{3}; bulk density = 0,7 g/cm^{3}
- Except where otherwise noted, data are given for materials in their standard state (at 25 °C [77 °F], 100 kPa). Infobox references

Ammonium polyphosphate is an inorganic salt of polyphosphoric acid and ammonia containing both chains and possibly branching. Its chemical formula is H(NH_{4}PO_{3})_{n}OH showing that each monomer consists of an orthophosphate radical of a phosphorus atom with three oxygens and one negative charge neutralized by an ammonium cation leaving two bonds free to polymerize. In the branched cases some monomers are missing the ammonium anion and instead link to three other monomers.

The properties of ammonium polyphosphate depend on the number of monomers in each molecule and to a degree on how often it branches. Shorter chains (n < 100) are more water sensitive and less thermally stable than longer chains (n > 1000), but short polymer chains (e.g. pyro-, tripoly-, and tetrapoly-) are more soluble and show increasing solubility with increasing chain length.

Ammonium polyphosphate can be prepared by reacting concentrated phosphoric acid with ammonia. However, iron and aluminum impurities, soluble in concentrated phosphoric acid, form gelatinous precipitates or "sludges" in ammonium polyphosphate at pH between 5 and 7. Other metal impurities such as copper, chromium, magnesium, and zinc form granular precipitates. However, depending on the degree of polymerization, ammonium polyphosphate can act as a chelating agent to keep certain metal ions dissolved in solution.

Ammonium polyphosphate is used as a food additive, emulsifier, (E number: E545) and as a fertilizer.

Ammonium polyphosphate (APP) is also used as a flame retardant in many applications such as paints and coatings, and in a variety of polymers: the most important ones are polyolefins, and particularly polypropylene, where APP is part of intumescent systems. Compounding with APP-based flame retardants in polypropylene is described in. Further applications are thermosets, where APP is used in unsaturated polyesters and gel coats (APP blends with synergists), epoxies and polyurethane castings (intumescent systems). APP is also applied to flame retard polyurethane foams.

Ammonium polyphosphates used as flame retardants in polymers have long chains and a specific crystallinity (Form II). They start to decompose at 240 °C to form ammonia and phosphoric acid. The phosphoric acid acts as an acid catalyst in the dehydration of carbon-based poly-alcohols, such as cellulose in wood. The phosphoric acid reacts with alcohol groups to form heat-unstable phosphate esters. The esters decompose to release carbon dioxide and regenerate the phosphoric acid catalyst. In the gas phase, the release of non-flammable carbon dioxide helps to dilute the oxygen of the air and flammable decomposition products of the material that is burning. In the condensed phase, the resultant carbonaceous char helps to shield the underlying polymer from attack by oxygen and radiant heat. Use as an intumescent is achieved when combined with starch-based materials such as pentaerythritol and melamine as expanding agents. The mechanisms of intumescence and the mode of action of APP are described in a series of publications.
