= Aerial firefighting =

Use of aircraft to combat wildfires

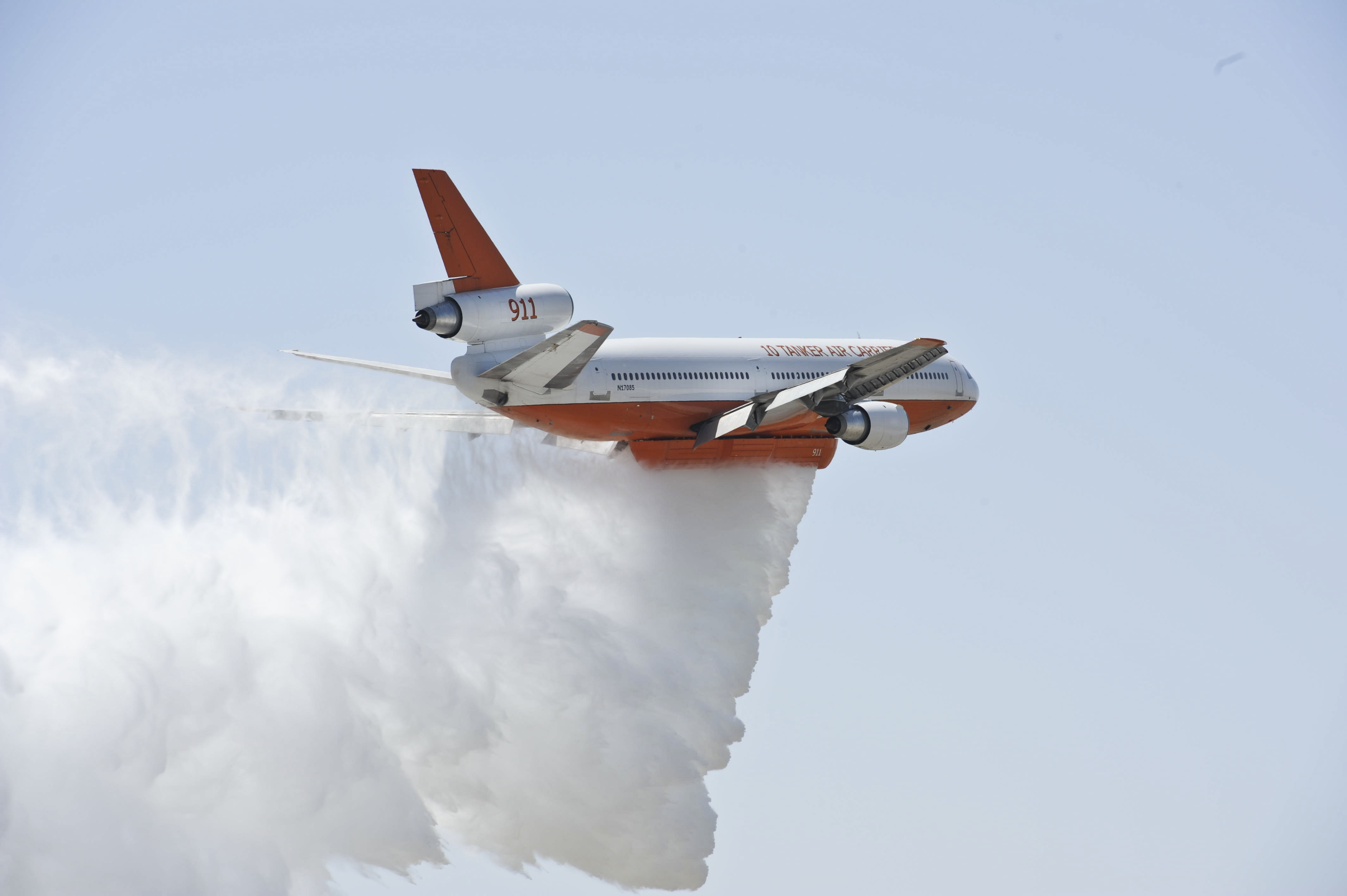
A DC-10 operated by 10 Tanker Air Carrier for the U.S. Forest Service demonstrates a water drop during "Thunder Over The Empire Air Fest" at March Air Reserve Base, Calif. (2012)

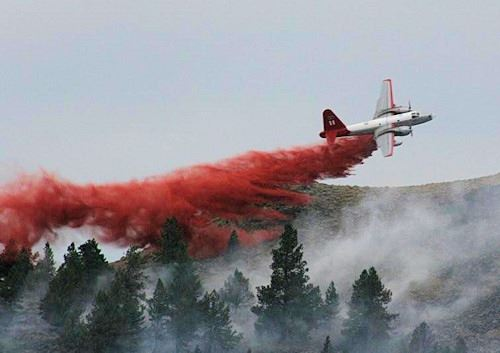
A Neptune Aviation Lockheed P2V drops fire retardant at Pine Mountain, Oregon. (2014)

Aerial firefighting, also known as waterbombing, is the use of aircraft and other aerial resources to combat wildfires. The types of aircraft used include fixed-wing aircraft and helicopters. Smokejumpers and rappellers are also classified as aerial firefighters, delivered to the fire by parachute from a variety of fixed-wing aircraft, or rappelling from helicopters. Chemicals used to fight fires may include water, water enhancers such as foams and gels, and specially formulated fire retardants such as Phos-Chek.

== Terminology ==
The idea of fighting forest fires from the air dates back at least as far as Friedrich Karl von Koenig-Warthausen's observations on seeing a blaze when overflying the Santa Lucia Range, California, in 1929.

A wide variety of terminology has been used in the popular media for the aircraft (and methods) used in aerial firefighting. The terms airtanker or air tanker generally refer to fixed-wing aircraft based in the United States; "airtanker" is used in official documentation. The term "waterbomber" is used in some Canadian government documents for the same class of vehicles, though it sometimes has a connotation of amphibians.

Air attack is an industry term used for the actual application of aerial resources, both fixed-wing and rotorcraft, on a fire. Within the industry, though, "air attack" may also refer to the supervisor in the air (usually in a fixed-wing aircraft) who supervises the process of attacking the wildfire from the air, including fixed-wing airtankers, helicopters, and any other aviation resources assigned to the fire. The Air Tactical Group Supervisor (ATGS), often called "air attack", is usually flying at an altitude above other resources assigned to the fire, often in a fixed-wing plane but occasionally (depending on assigned resources or the availability of qualified personnel) in a helicopter.

Depending on the size, location, and assessed potential of the wildfire, the "air attack" or ATGS person may be charged with initial attack (the first response of firefighting assets on fire suppression), or with extended attack, the ongoing response to and management of a major wildfire requiring additional resources including engines, ground crews, and other aviation personnel and aircraft needed to control the fire and establish control lines or firelines ahead of the wildfire.

== Equipment ==
A wide variety of helicopters and fixed-wing aircraft are used for aerial firefighting. In 2003, it was reported that "The U.S. Forest Service and Bureau of Land Management own, lease, or contract for nearly 1,000 aircraft each fire season, with annual expenditures in excess of US$250 million in recent years".

=== Helicopters ===
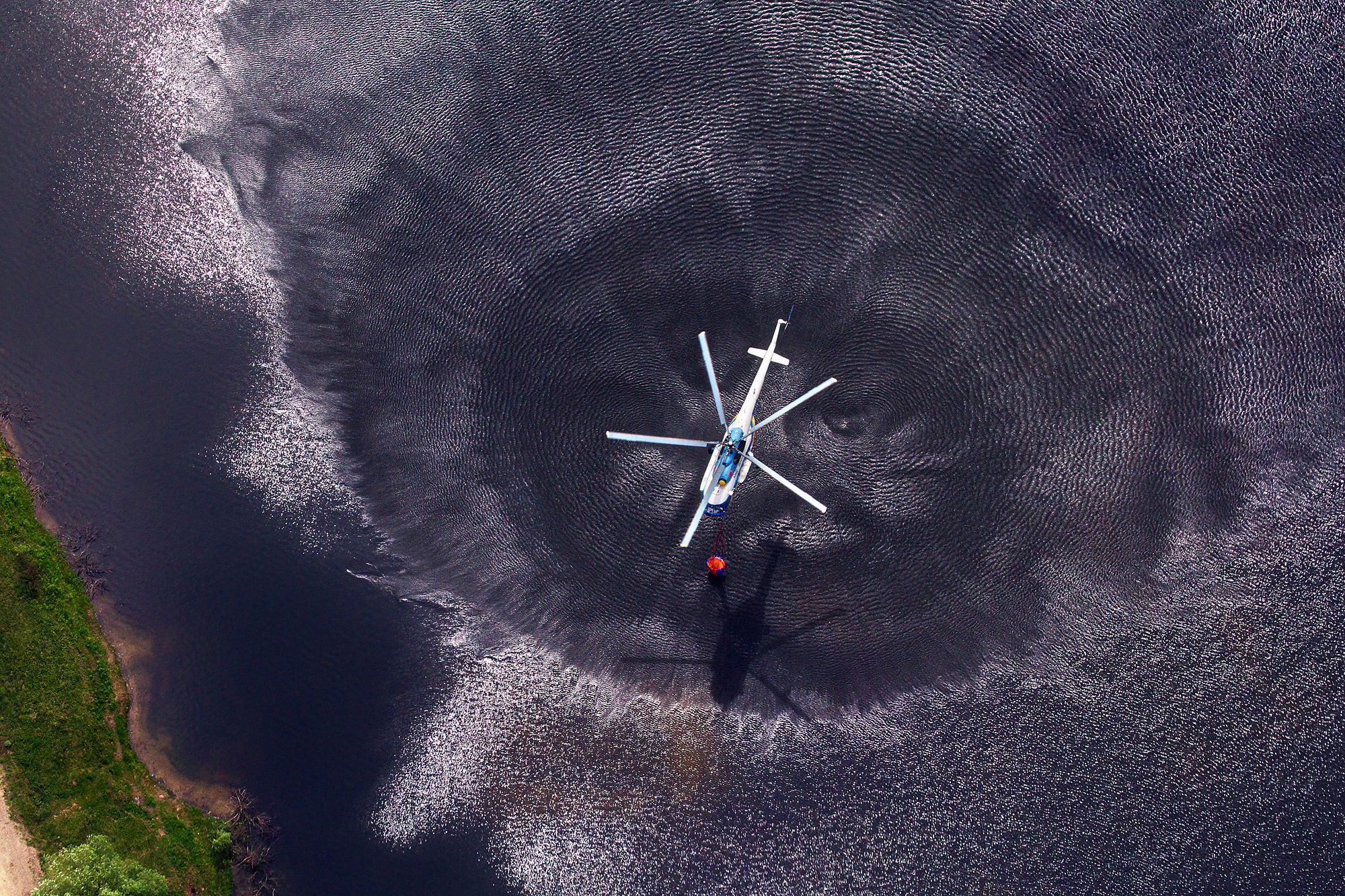
State Emergency Service of Ukraine (DSNS) Mil Mi-8MTV picking up water near Nizhyn

Helicopters may be fitted with tanks (helitankers) or they may carry buckets. Some helitankers, such as the Erickson AirCrane, are also outfitted with a front-mounted foam cannon. Buckets are usually filled by submerging or dipping them in lakes, rivers, reservoirs, or portable tanks. The most popular of the buckets is the flexible Bambi Bucket. Tanks can be filled on the ground (by water tenders or truck-mounted systems) or water can be siphoned from lakes, rivers, reservoirs, or a portable tank through a hanging snorkel. Popular firefighting helicopters include variants of the Bell UH-1H Super Huey, Bell 204, Bell 205, Bell 212, Boeing Vertol 107, Boeing Vertol 234, Sikorsky S-70 "Firehawk" and the Sikorsky S-64 Aircrane helitanker, which features a snorkel for filling from a natural or man-made water source while in hover. Currently the world's largest helicopter, the Mil Mi-26, uses a Bambi bucket.

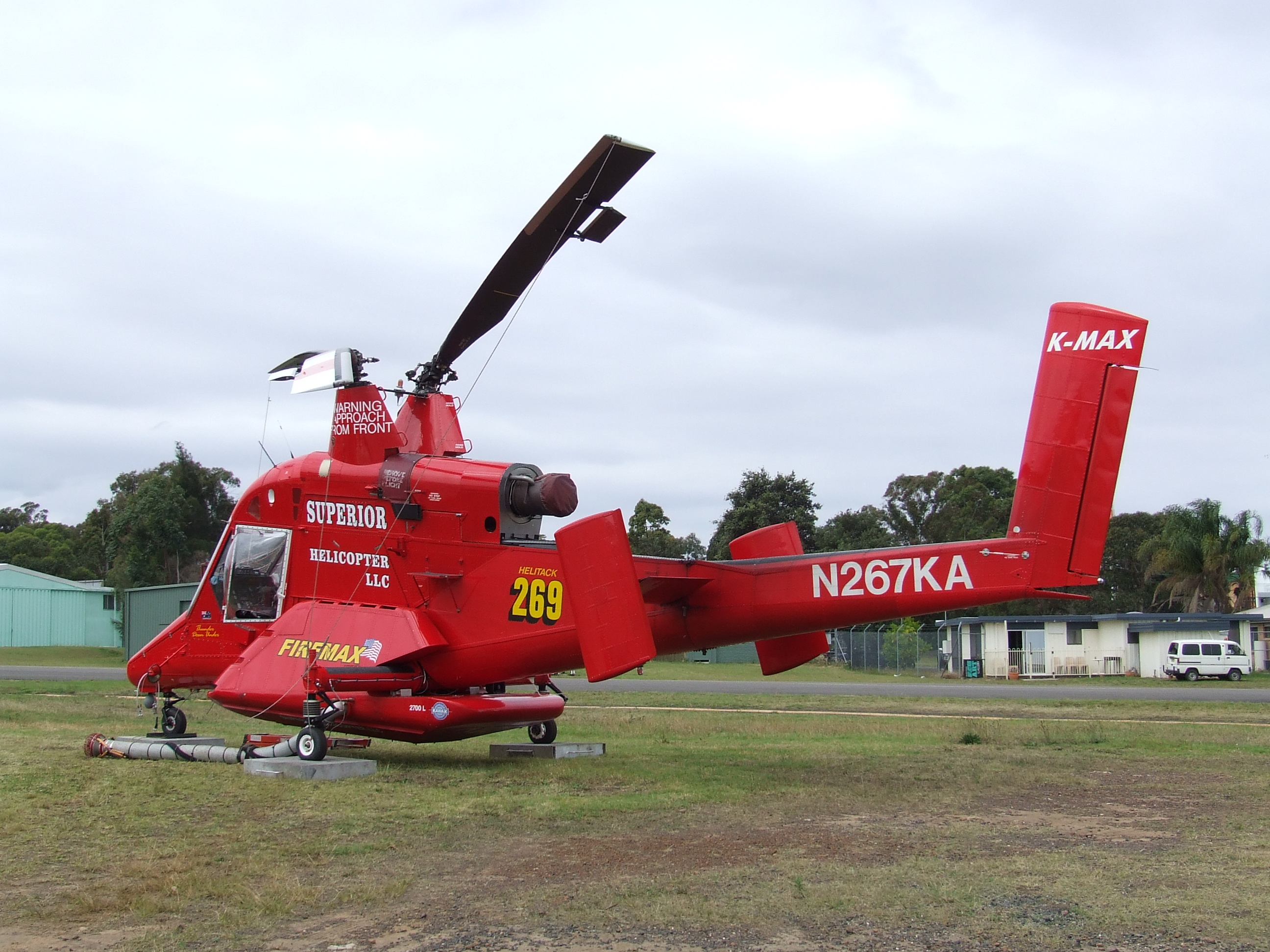
Kaman K-Max K-1200 used for aerial firefighting in Idaho

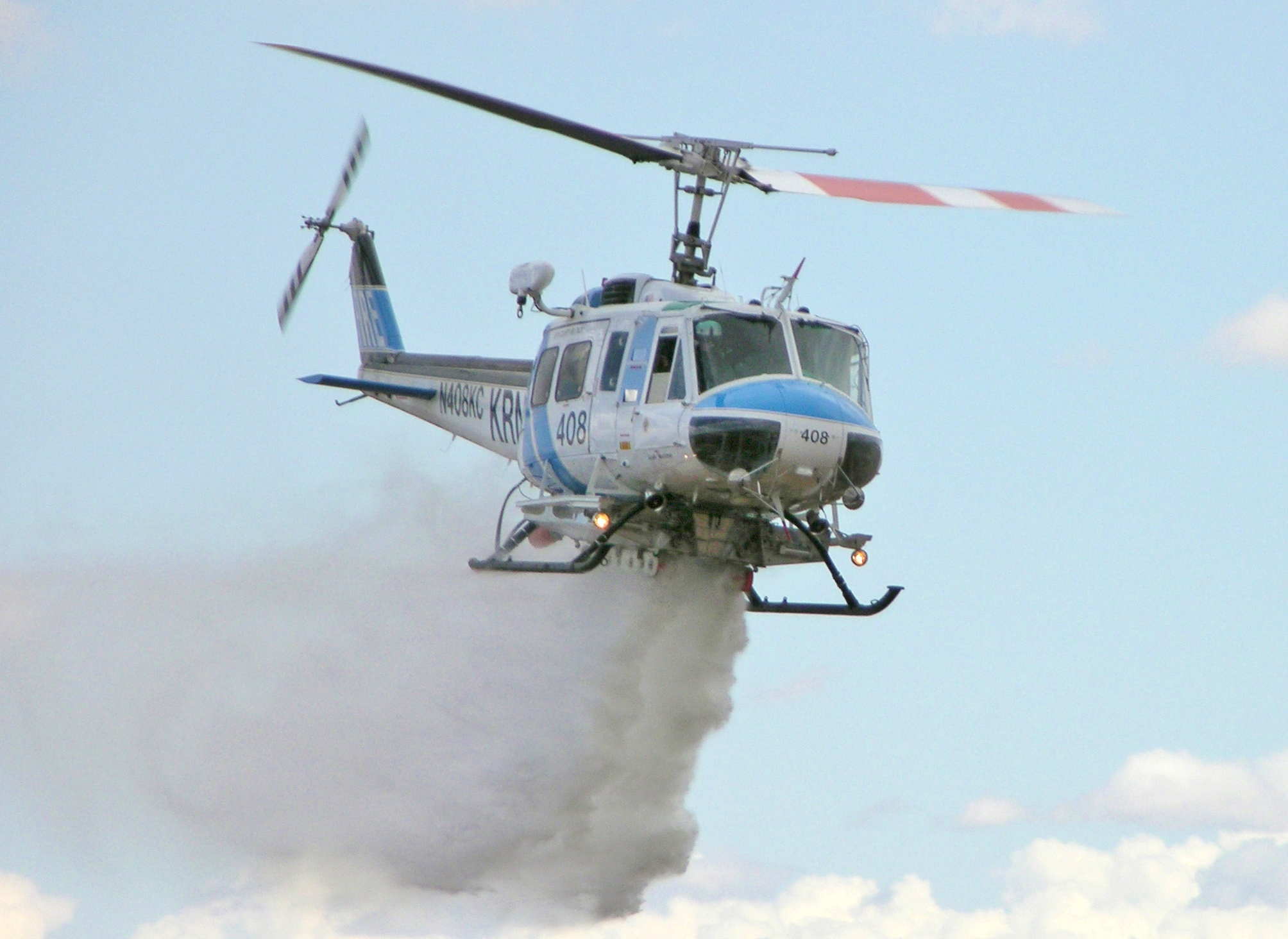
Kern County (California) Fire Department Bell 205 dropping water during a training exercise at the Mojave Spaceport

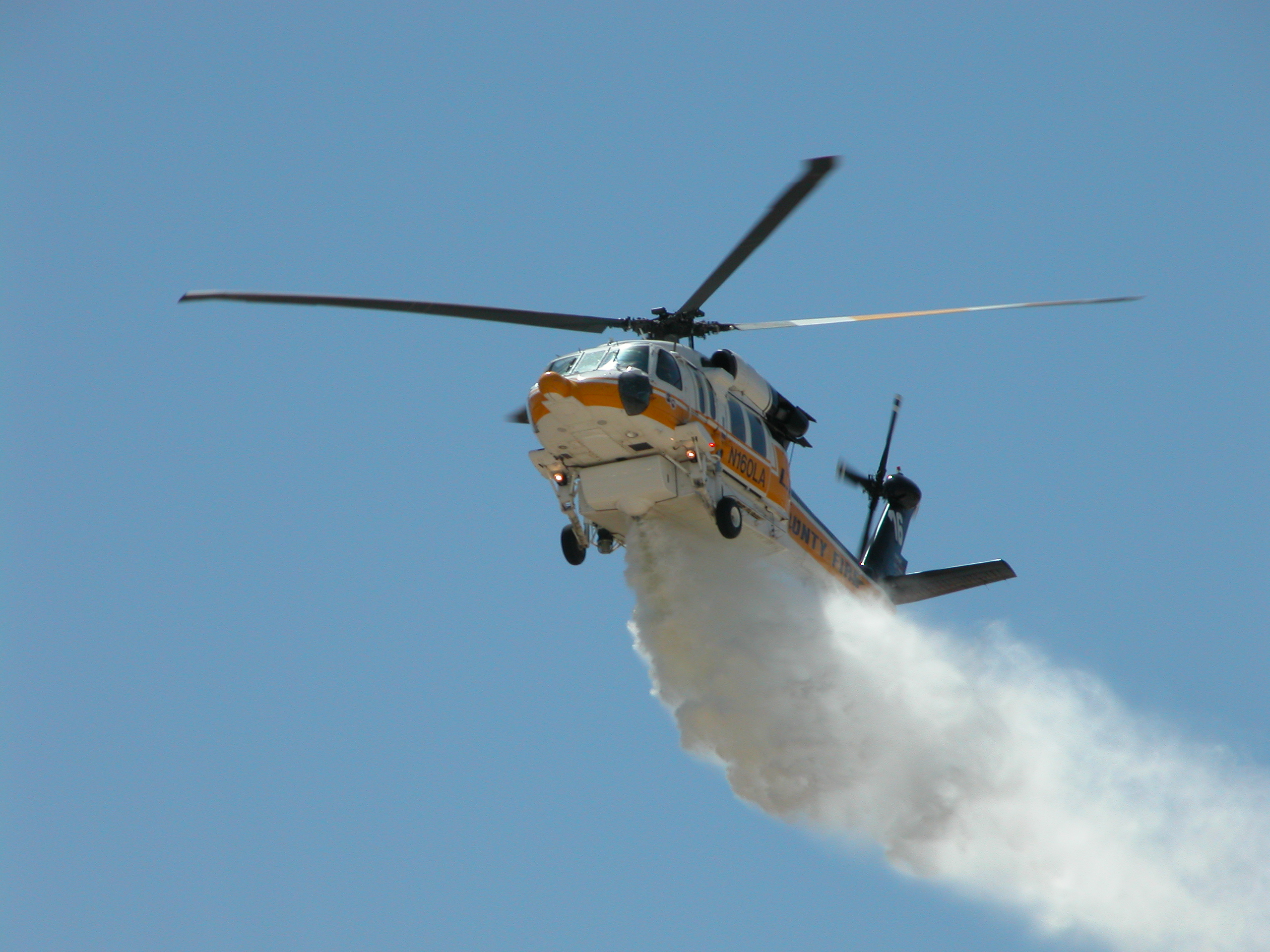
Los Angeles County Fire Department's Sikorsky S-70C Firehawk during a water drop demonstration at Station 129 in Lancaster, California

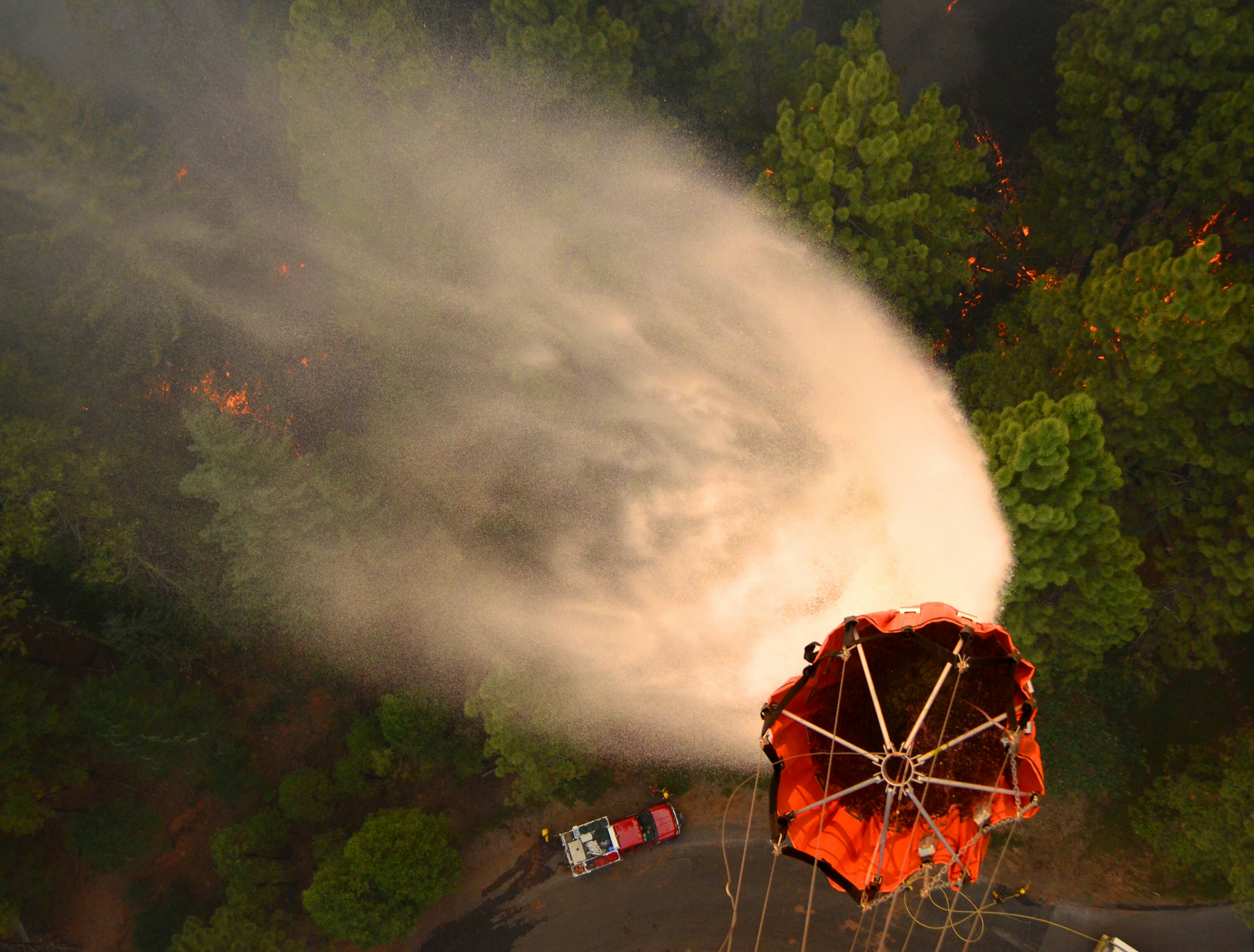
U.S. Airmen with the 129th Rescue Wing, California Air National Guard drop water on the Rim Fire near Yosemite, California, August 26, 2013

=== Water and fire retardant bombers ===
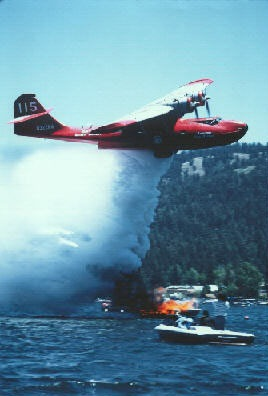
A Consolidated PBY Catalina amphibious flying boat air tanker

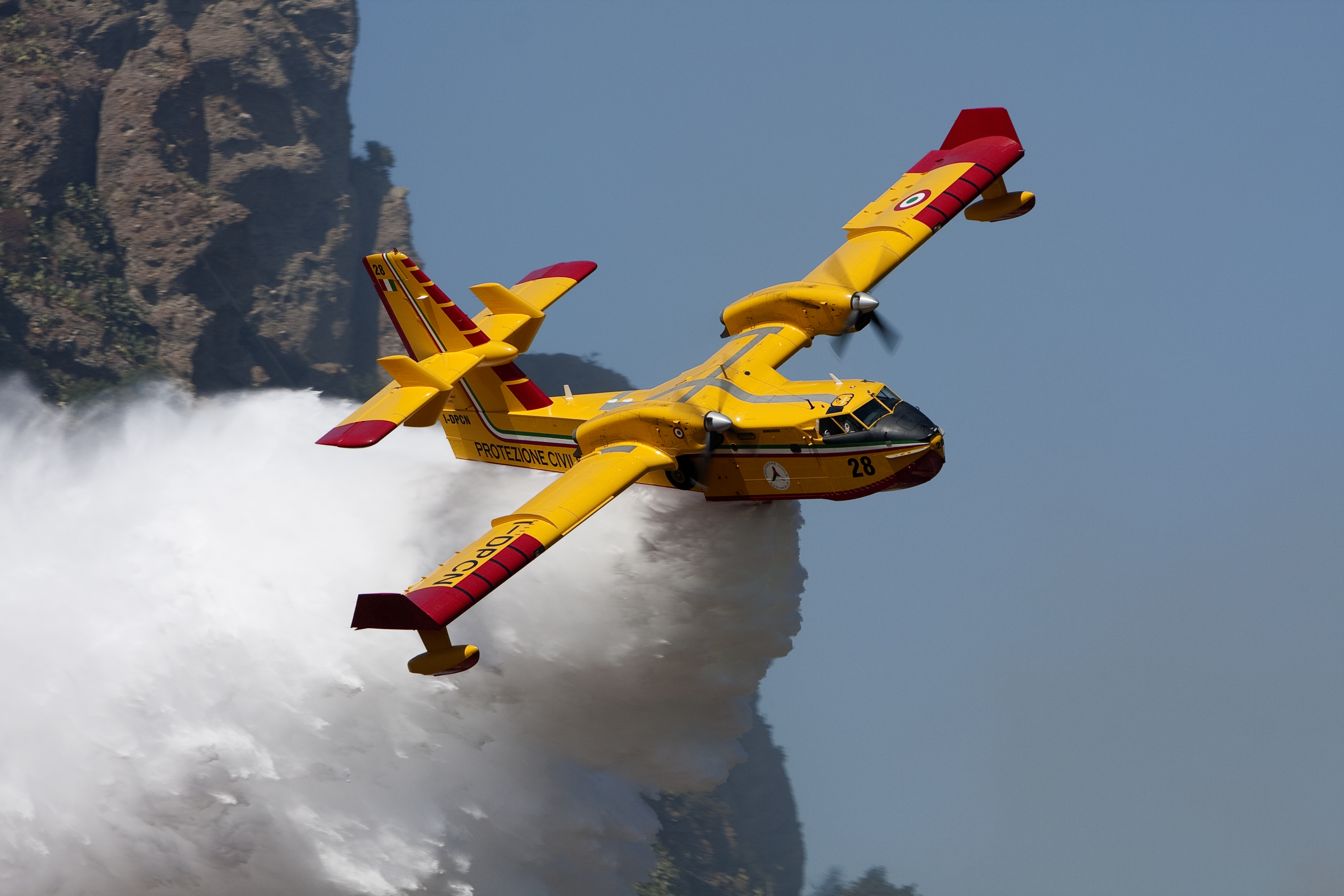
An Italian Canadair CL-415 at work

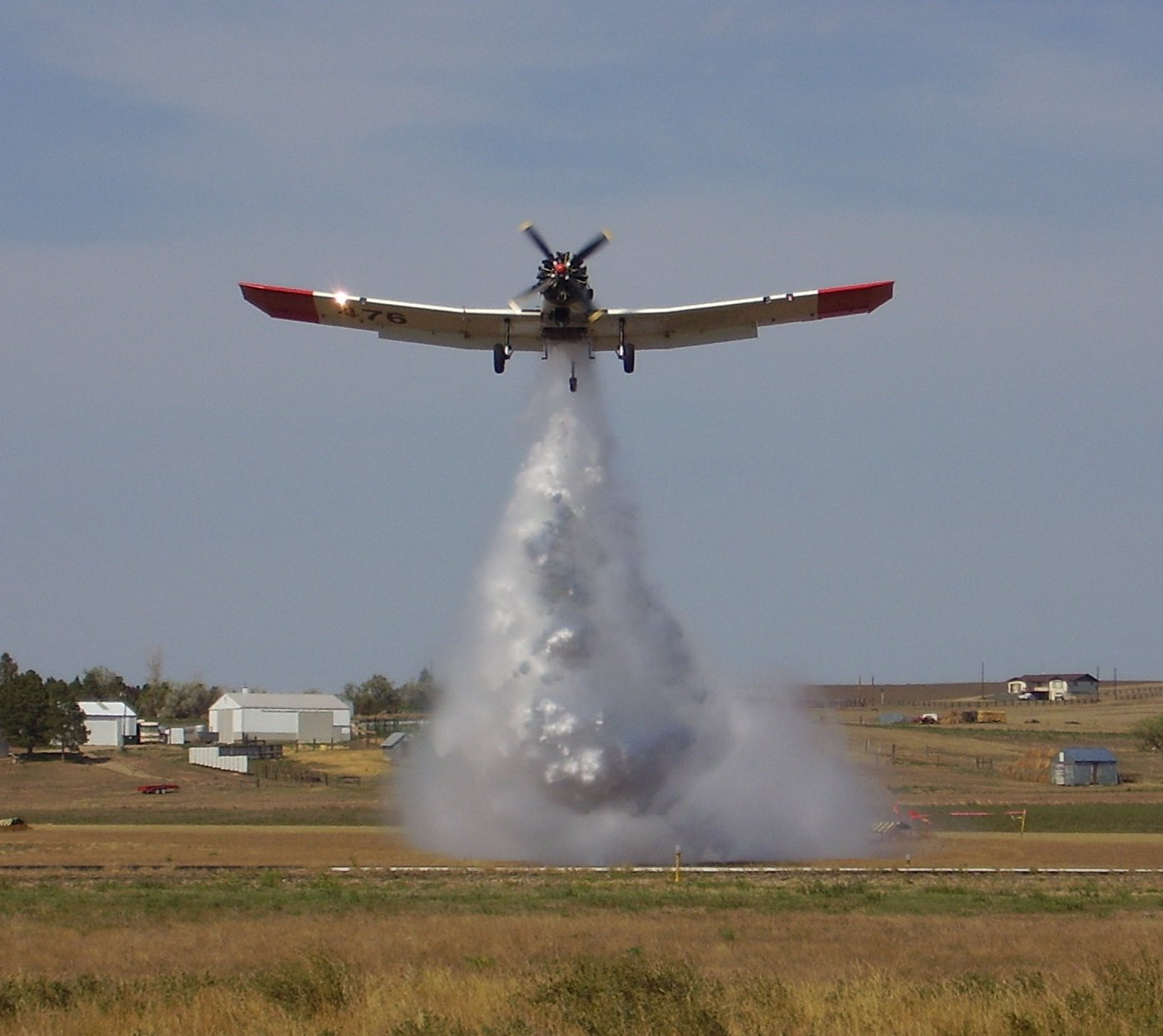
A PZL M-18 Dromader drops water in an exercise near Mobridge, South Dakota, in the US.

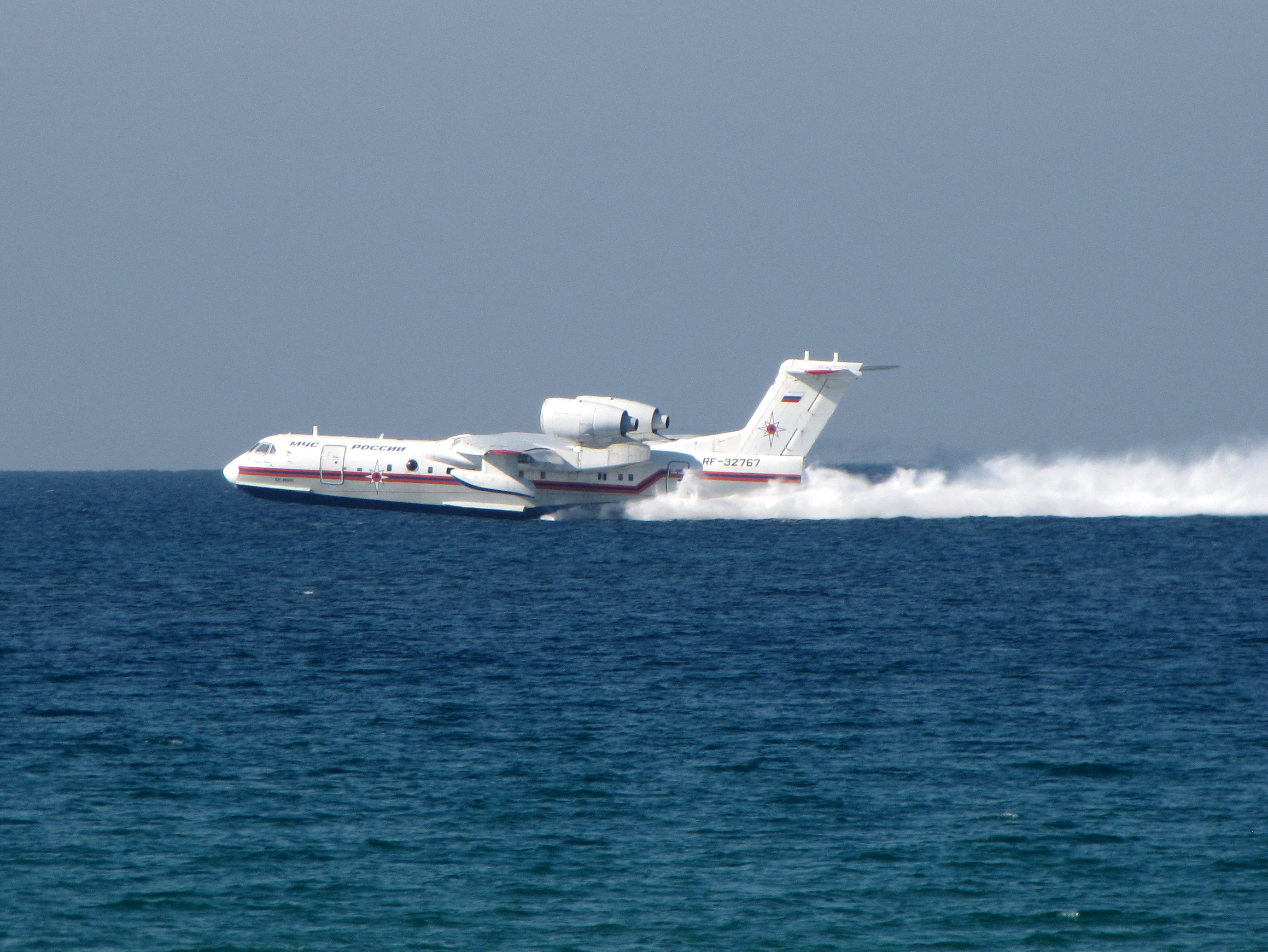
Beriev Be-200 filling water tanks in the Mediterranean Sea while in operation against the 2010 Mount Carmel forest fire

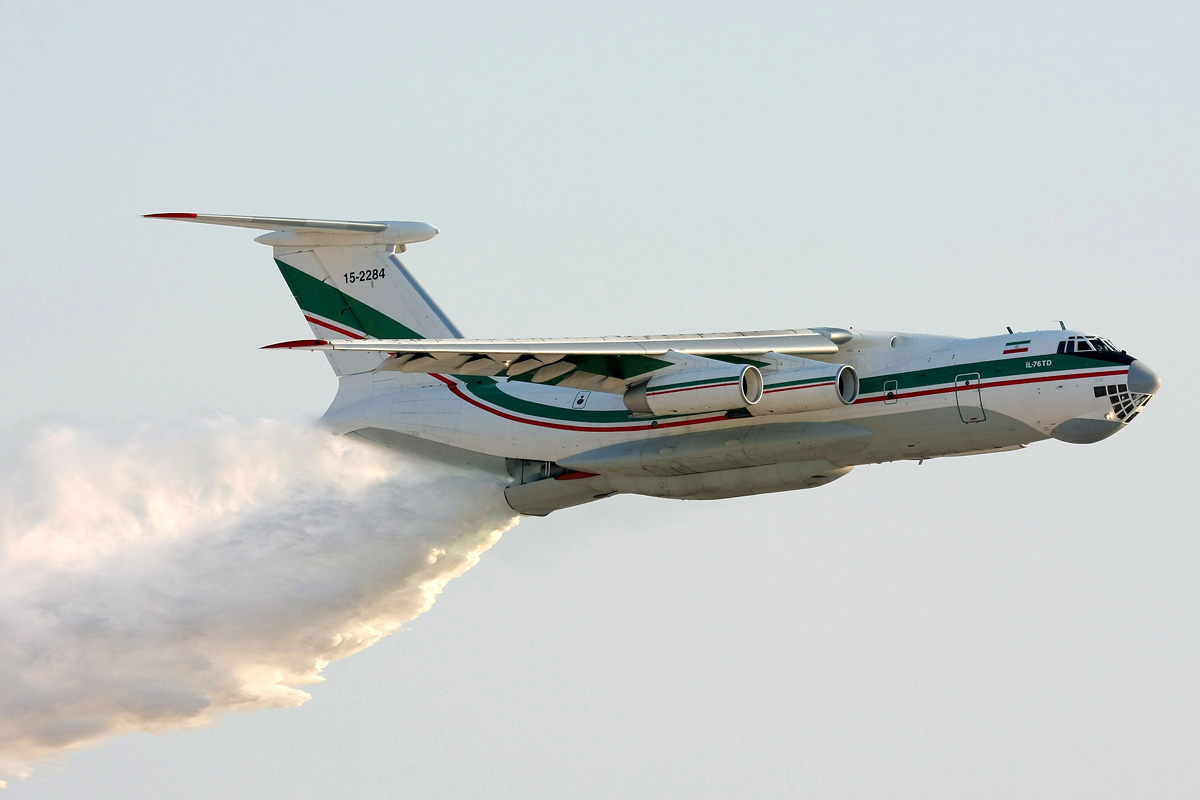
An Ilyushin Il-76TD of Iran's Islamic Revolutionary Guard Corps demonstrates aerial firefighting at an air show.

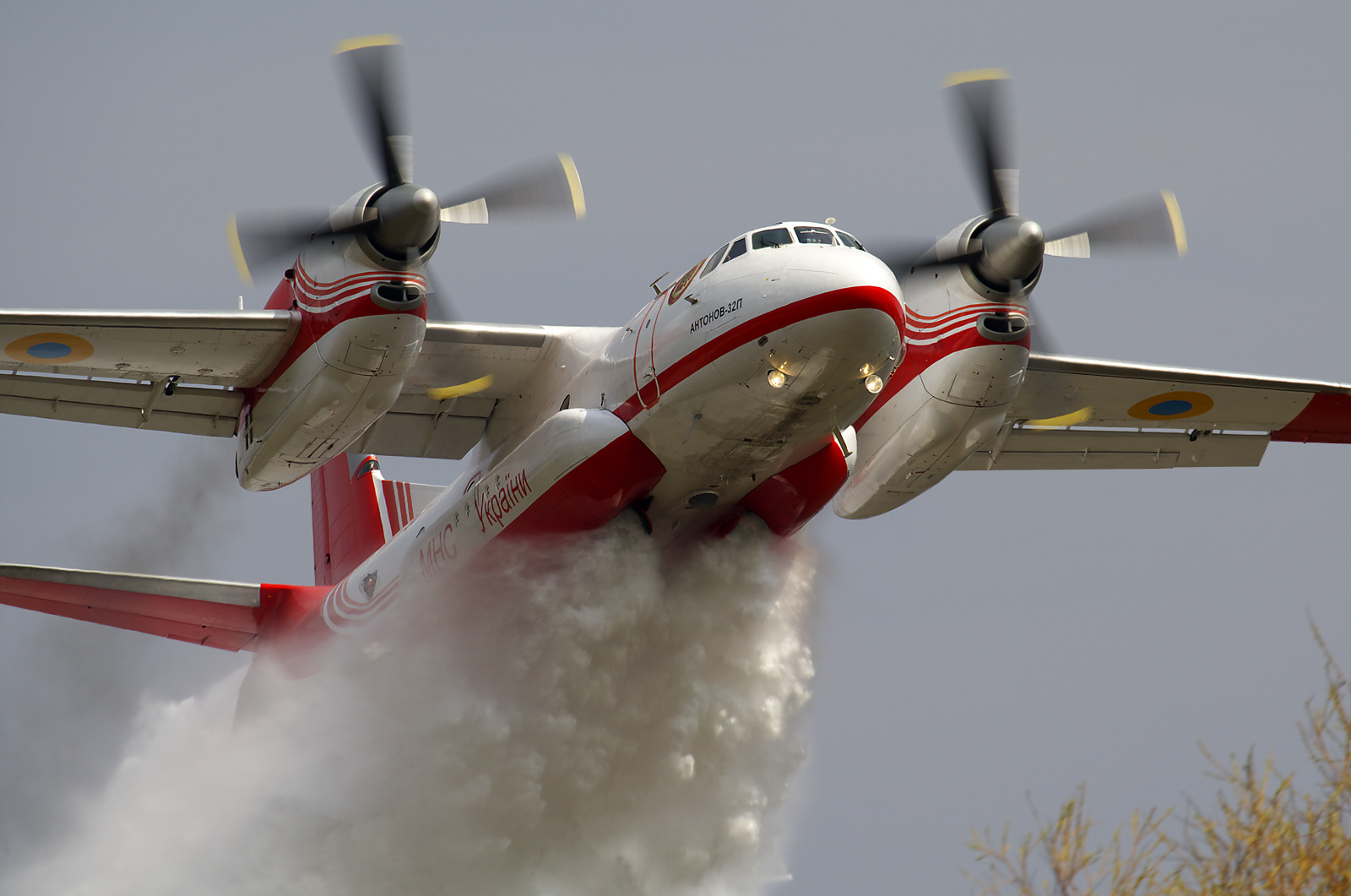
An Antonov An-32 of the State Emergency Service of Ukraine dumps water on a forest fire.

Airtankers or water bombers are fixed-wing aircraft fitted with tanks that can be filled on the ground at an air tanker base or, in the case of flying boats and amphibious aircraft, by skimming water from lakes, reservoirs, or large rivers without needing to land. Various aircraft have been used over the years for firefighting. In 1947, the United States Air Force and United States Forest Service experimented with military aircraft dropping water-filled bombs. The bombs were unsuccessful, and the use of internal water tanks was adopted instead.

The Mendocino Air Tanker Squad formed by Joseph Bolles Ely in 1956 was the first such unit in the United States to drop water and retardant on fires. Based at the Willows-Glenn County Airport it soon led the way for other agencies to form similar squads.

Though World War II- and Korean War-era bombers were for a long time the mainstay of the aerial firefighting fleet, newer purpose-built tankers have since come online. The smallest are the Single Engine Air Tankers (SEATs). These are agricultural sprayers that generally drop about 800 US gallons (3,000 L) of water or retardant. Examples include the Air Tractor AT-802, which can deliver around 800 gallons of water or fire retardant solution in each drop, and the Soviet Antonov An-2 biplane. Both of these aircraft can be fitted with floats that scoop water from the surface of a body of water. Similar in configuration to the World War II–era Consolidated PBY Catalina, the Canadair CL-215 and its derivative the CL-415 are designed and built specifically for firefighting. The Croatian Air Force uses six CL-415s as well as six AT 802s for firefighting purposes.

Medium-sized modified aircraft include the Grumman S-2 Tracker (retrofitted with turboprop engines as the S-2T) as used by the California Department of Forestry and Fire Protection (CAL FIRE), as well as the Conair Firecat version developed and used by Conair Group Inc. of Canada, while the Douglas DC-4, the Douglas DC-7, the Lockheed C-130 Hercules, the Lockheed P-2 Neptune, and the Lockheed P-3 Orion – and its commercial equivalent, the L-188 Electra – have been used as air tankers. Conair also converted a number of Convair 580 and Fokker F27 Friendship turboprop airliners to air tankers.

The largest aerial firefighter ever used is a Boeing 747 aerial firefighter, known as the Global Supertanker, that can carry 19,600 US gallons (74,200 L) fed by a pressurized drop system. The Supertanker was deployed operationally for the first time in 2009, fighting a fire in Spain. The tanker made its first American operation on August 31, 2009, at the Oak Glen Fire. It has since been replaced by a Boeing 747-400. Another wide body jetliner that is currently being used as an air tanker is the modified McDonnell Douglas DC-10-30 operated by the 10 Tanker Air Carrier company as the DC-10 Air Tanker. It can carry up to 12,000 US gallons (45,400 L) of fire fighting retardant.

The Russian Ministry of Emergency Situations operates convertible-to-cargo Ilyushin Il-76 airtankers that have been operating with 11,000-US-gallon (41,600 L) tanking systems, and several Beriev Be-200 jet powered amphibian aircraft. The Be-200 can carry a maximum payload of about 12,000 litres (3,200 US gal) of water, making "scoops" in suitable stretches of water in 14 seconds.

Bombardier's Dash 8 Q Series aircraft are the basis of new, next-generation air tankers. Cascade Aerospace has converted two pre-owned Q400s to act as part-time water bomber and part-time transport aircraft for France's Sécurité Civile, while Neptune Aviation is converting a pre-owned Q300 as a prototype to augment its Lockheed P-2 Neptune aircraft. The Sécurité Civile also operates twelve Canadair CL-415 and nine Conair Turbo Firecat aircraft. Neptune Aviation also currently operates converted British Aerospace 146 jetliners as air tankers. The BAe 146 can carry up to 3,000 gallons of fire fighting retardant. Air Spray USA Ltd. of Chico, California has also converted the BAe 146 jetliner to the role of air tanker. Another modern-era passenger aircraft that has now been converted for aerial firefighting missions in the U.S. is the McDonnell Douglas MD-87 jetliner operated by Erickson Aero Tanker. The MD-87 can carry up to 4,000 gallons of fire fighting retardant. Coulson Aviation unveiled a Boeing 737-300 firefighting conversion in May 2017. Six aircraft have been purchased from Southwest Airlines for the RADS system conversion which was planned to enter service in December 2017. The 737 aircraft is smaller than the C-130Q which allows for a wider range of airfields to be utilized. Britt Coulson further stated the aircraft will be able to retain the current seat and galley configuration for tanker operations. On 22 November 2018, the 737 was used for the first time to fight a fire near Newcastle, Australia.

In July 2022, Airbus tested the aerial firefighting capacity of the A400M using a roll-on/roll-off kit comprising a 20-tonne water tank and piping allowing the load to be expelled from the end of the cargo ramp.

=== Comparison table of fixed-wing firefighting tanker airplanes ===
All links, citations and data sources are listed in the paragraph above. For accident and grounding citations, see paragraph below table.

Make and model	Country of origin	Category	Water/retardant capacity, US gallons (litres)	Notes
Air Tractor AT-802F	United States	Light	807 US gal (3,050 L)	
Air Tractor AT-1002	United States	Medium	1,000 US gal (3,800 L)	
AN-32P Firekiller	Ukraine	Medium	2,113 US gal (8,000 L)	
AVIC AG600 Kunlong	China	Medium	3,170 US gal (12,000 L)	In development
BAe 146	United Kingdom	Medium	3,000 US gal (11,000 L)	
Beriev Be-200	Russia	Medium	3,173 US gal (12,010 L)	
Coulson Aviation-Boeing 737 FireLiner	United States	Medium	4,000 US gal (15,000 L)	
Boeing 747 Supertanker	United States	Heavy	19,600 US gal (74,000 L)	No longer in service
Bombardier Dash 8 Q400-MR	Canada	Medium	2,600 US gal (9,800 L)	
Canadair CL-215	Canada	Medium	1,300 US gal (4,900 L)	
Canadair CL-415	Canada	Medium	1,621 US gal (6,140 L)	
Consolidated PB4Y-2 Privateer	United States	Medium	2,000 US gal (7,600 L)	No longer in service
De Havilland Canada DHC-515	Canada	Medium	1,850 US gal (7,000 L)	
Douglas B-26	United States	Medium		No longer in service
Douglas DC-4	United States	Medium		No longer in service
Douglas DC-6	United States	Medium	2,800 US gal (11,000 L)	no longer in service
Douglas DC-7	United States	Medium	3,000 US gal (11,000 L)	No longer in service
Embraer C-390 Millennium	Brazil	Medium	3,200 US gal (12,000 L)	
Fairchild C-119 Flying Boxcar	United States	Medium		No longer in service
Grumman S-2 Tracker	United States	Medium	1,200 US gal (4,500 L)	
Ilyushin Il-76	Russia	Heavy	13,000 US gal (49,000 L)	Largest active waterbomber aircraft
Lockheed C-130 Hercules	United States	Medium	3,000 US gal (11,000 L)	
Lockheed L-188 Electra	United States	Medium	3,000 US gal (11,000 L)	
Martin Mars	United States	Medium	7,200 US gal (27,000 L)	No longer in service
McDonnell Douglas DC-10-30	United States	Heavy	12,000 US gal (45,000 L)	
McDonnell Douglas MD-87	United States	Medium	4,000 US gal (15,000 L)	
North American B-25	United States	Medium		No longer in service
P-2V Neptune	United States	Medium	2,362 US gal (8,940 L)	No longer in service
P-3 Orion	United States	Medium	3,000 US gal (11,000 L)	No longer in service
PBY Catalina	United States	Medium	1,000 US gal (3,800 L) or 1,500 US gal (5,700 L) for the Super model	No longer in service
PZL-Mielec M-18 Dromader	Poland	Light	570 US gal (2,200 L)	
ShinMaywa US-2	Japan	Medium	3,595 US gal (13,610 L)	

Category legend: Light: under 1,000 US gallons (3,800 L), Medium: under 10,000 US gallons (38,000 L), Heavy: Greater than 10,000 US gallons (38,000 L)

Other former military aircraft utilized as firefighting air tankers in the U.S. in the past included the B-17 and the PB4Y-2, a version of the B-24.

=== Leadplanes ===
The Lead Plane function directs the activities of the airtankers by both verbal target descriptions and by physically leading the airtankers on the drop run. The leadplane is typically referred to as a "Bird Dog" in Canada or "Supervision" aircraft in Australia. The O-2 Skymaster, Cessna 310 and OV-10 Bronco have been used as spotter and lead plane platforms. The Ontario Ministry of Natural Resources has also used the Cessna 337. The Beechcraft Baron was long used as a leadplane or air attack ship, but most were retired in 2003; more common now is the Beechcraft King Air and the Twin Commander 690. A Cessna Citation 500 jet owned by Air Spray (1967) LTd. was used by the British Columbia Ministry of Forests beginning in 1995 and used for two fire seasons to lead the very fast Electra L188 air tanker to the fires. This was the first time a jet aircraft was used as a lead plane or "bird dog". The Department of Parks and Wildlife in Western Australia operates a fleet of nine American Champion Scouts 8GCBC during the summer months as spotter aircraft and Air Attack platforms. The Provinces of Alberta and British Columbia and the Yukon Territories contract to supply Twin Commander 690 as bird dog aircraft for their air tanker fleets. Air Spray owns 9 Twin Commander 690 for use as bird dog aircraft.

=== Fleet grounding ===
In the United States, most of these aircraft are privately owned and contracted to government agencies, and the National Guard and the U.S. Marines also maintain fleets of firefighting aircraft. On May 10, 2004, The U.S. Forest Service (USFS) and the Bureau of Land Management (BLM) announced that they were cancelling contracts with operators of 33 heavy airtankers. They cited liability concerns and an inability to safely manage the fleet after the wing failure and resulting crash of a C-130A Hercules in California and a PB4Y-2 in Colorado during the summer of 2002. Both aged aircraft broke up in flight due to catastrophic fatigue cracks at the wing roots. After subsequent third-party examination and extensive testing of all USFS contracted heavy airtankers, three companies were awarded contracts and now maintain a combined fleet of 23 aircraft.

== Fire retardant ==
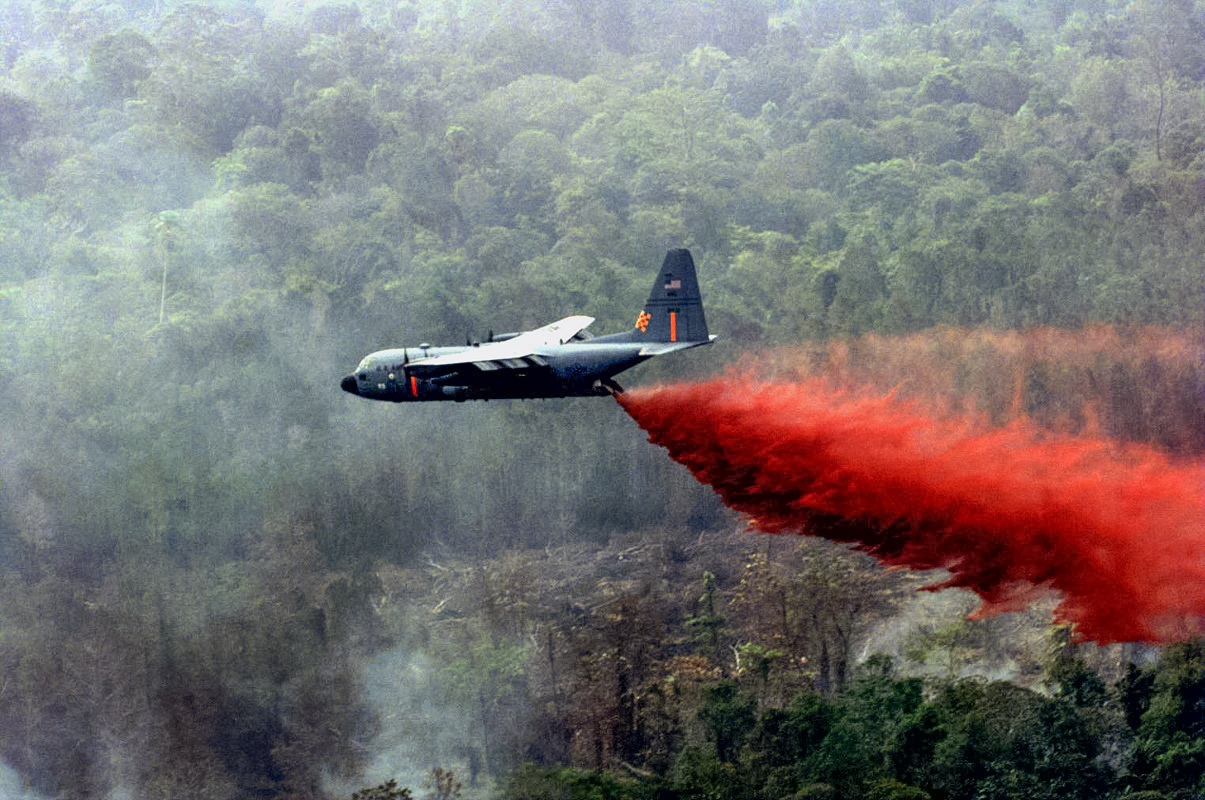
A MAFFS-equipped Air National Guard C-130 Hercules drops fire retardant on wildfires in southern California

Borate salts used in the past to fight wildfires have been found to sterilize the soil and be toxic to animals so are now prohibited. Newer retardants use ammonium sulfate or ammonium polyphosphate with attapulgite clay thickener or diammonium phosphate with a guar gum derivative thickener. Fire retardants often contain wetting agents, preservatives and rust inhibitors and are colored red with ferric oxide or fugitive color to mark where they have been dropped. Brand names of fire retardants for aerial application include Fortress and Phos-Chek.

Some water-dropping aircraft carry tanks of a guar gum derivative to thicken the water and reduce runoff.

== Tactics and capabilities ==
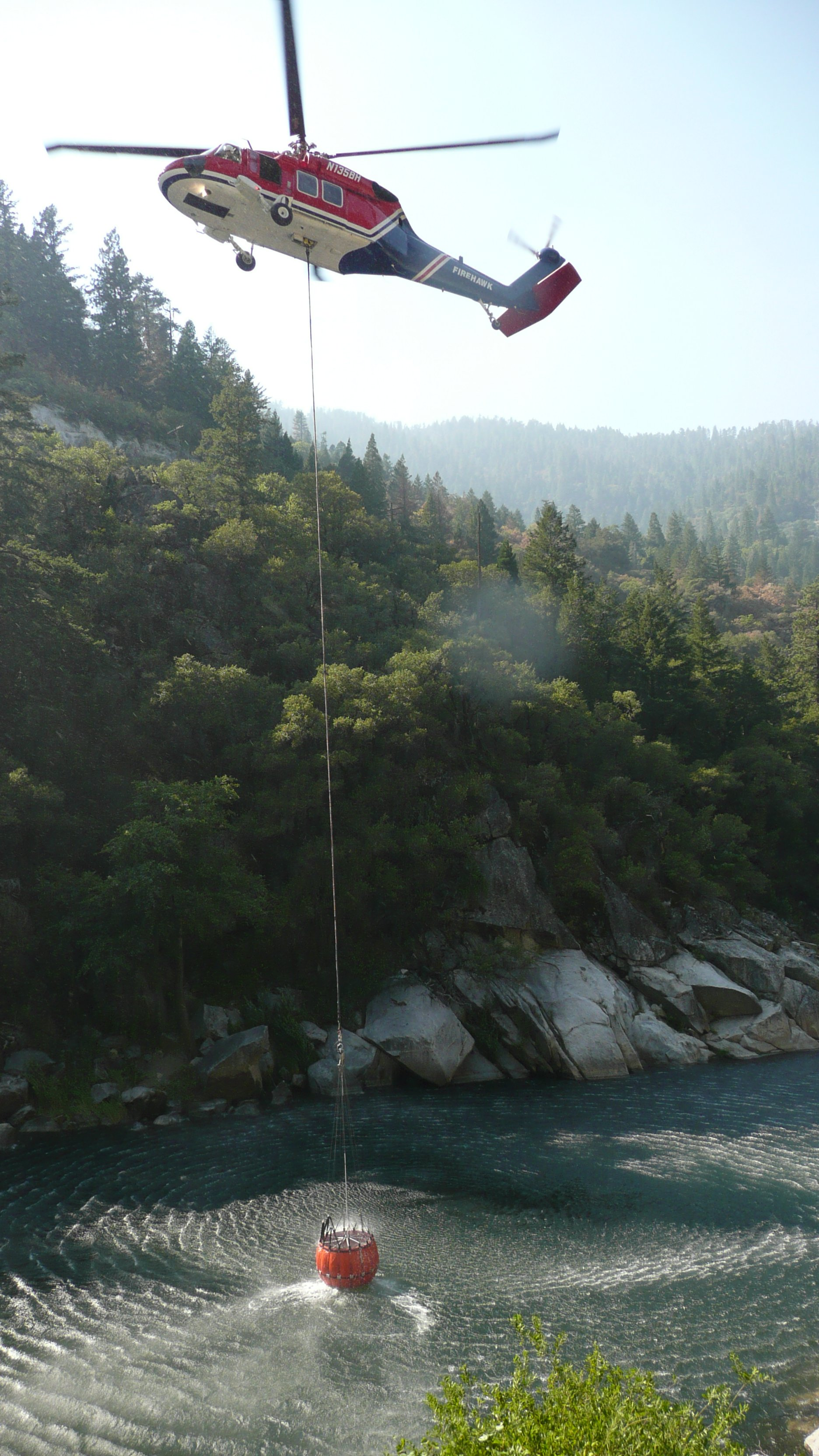
A helicopter dips its bucket into a river to drop water on a wildfire in California.

Helicopters can hover over the fire and drop water or retardant. The S-64 Helitanker has microprocessor-controlled doors on its tank. The doors are controlled based on the area to be covered and wind conditions. Fixed-wing aircraft must make a pass and drop water or retardant like a bomber. Spotter (Air Tactical Group Supervisor) aircraft often orbit the fire at a higher altitude to coordinate the efforts of the smoke jumper, helicopter, media, and retardant-dropping aircraft, while lead planes fly low-level ahead of the airtankers to mark the trajectory for the drop, and ensure overall safety for both ground-based and aerial firefighters.

Film showing Waterbombers from the California Air National Guard dropping substances used to fight fires

Water is not usually dropped directly on flames because its effect is short-lived. Fire retardants are not typically used to extinguish the fire, but instead are used to contain the fire, or slow it down to allow ground crews to contain it. Because of this, retardants are usually dropped in front of or around a moving fire, rather than directly on it, creating a firebreak.

Aerial firefighting is most effectively used in conjunction with ground-based efforts, as aircraft are only one weapon in the firefighting arsenal. However, there have been cases of aircraft extinguishing fires long before ground crews were able to reach them.

Some firefighting aircraft can refill their tanks in mid-flight, by flying down to skim the surface of large bodies of water. One example is the Bombardier CL-415. This is particularly useful in rural areas where flying back to an airbase for refills may take too much time. In 2002 an Ontario CL-415 crew was able to refill 100 times within a 4-hour mission, delivering 162,000 US gallons (613,240 L) or 1,350,000 pounds (612 t) of water on a fire near Dryden, Ontario (June 1, 2002 Dryden fire # 10 Tanker #271 civil ident C-GOGE).

== Accidents and incidents ==
- June 27, 1969: a North American B-25 Mitchell, N9088Z SN 44-30733, operating as Tanker 8Z, crash landed on a sandbar after a multi engine failure shortly after takeoff in the Tanana River, near Fairbanks Alaska. All crew members survived with no injuries. The airplane was recovered in June 2013 and is now under restoration, flying under the name "Sandbar Mitchell".
- May 26, 1977: a Canadair CL-215 aircraft crashed during a training session while doing its water-taking maneuver in Greece's Eleusis Bay, killing all of its three crew members on board.
- August 13, 1994: a Lockheed C-130A, N135FF, operating as Tanker 82, impacted mountainous terrain near Pearblossom, California. All three crew members sustained fatal injuries.
- June 21, 1995: a Douglas C-54G, N4989P, operating as Tanker 19, and a Beech B58P, N156Z, operating as Lead 56 collided in mid air in Ramona, California. Two crew members of Tanker 19 as well as the pilot of Lead 56 were killed in the collision.
- June 17, 2002: Tanker 130, a Lockheed C-130A operated by Hawkins & Powers Aviation crashed while fighting the Cannon Fire near Walker, California after structural failure caused both wings to detach from the plane. All 3 crew members on board were killed.
- July 18, 2002: Tanker 123, a Consolidated PB4Y-2 crashed while fighting the Big Elk Fire near Lyons, Colorado following the structural failure of its left wing, killing both crew members on board.
- July 31, 2010: a Convair CV580 operated by Conair Aviation crashed battling a wildfire near Vancouver BC. The two pilots were killed in the crash.
- May 21, 2011: a Bell 212 helicopter went down just offshore in Lesser Slave Lake, Alberta, killing the pilot.
- June 3, 2012: a Lockheed P2V-7, operating as Tanker 11, crashed into mountainous terrain while fighting a wildfire in Utah. The 2 pilots were killed in the crash.
- July 1, 2012: a Lockheed C-130 operated by the North Carolina Air National Guard's 145th Airlift Wing crashed in the Black Hills of South Dakota while supporting efforts to contain the White Draw Fire. Four airmen were killed, while two airmen survived the crash but sustained serious injuries.
- October 24, 2013: a modified PZL-Mielec M-18A Dromader, operated by Rebel Ag crashed after the left wing separated in flight while conducting waterbombing operations west of Ulladulla, New South Wales, killing the pilot.
- October 7, 2014: witness reports an S2T impacting terrain while engaging the Dog Rock Fire near Yosemite National Park California
- May 22, 2015: an Air Tractor 802F Fire Boss amphibious air tanker, operated by Conair Aviation crashed battling a wildfire near Cold Lake, Alberta, killing the pilot.
- July 10, 2015: an Air Tractor 802F Fire Boss amphibious air tanker, operated by Conair Aviation crashed and sank while scooping water from Puntzi Lake, British Columbia. The pilot was not injured.
- 17 August 2018: a BK117 owned by Sydney Helicopters crashed after hitting a tree while supporting operations on the Kingiman fire west of Ulladulla, New South Wales, Australia, with the pilot dying.
- 23 January 2020: C-130H N134CG of Coulson Aviation was destroyed when it crashed near Cooma, New South Wales during operations to fight a bushfire of the 2019–20 Australian bushfires. 3 fatalities.
- 14 August 2021: A Russian Be-200 plane crashed while fighting wildfires in Turkey. Eight people were on board, all of whom were killed.
- July 21, 2022: A CH-47 Chinook of ROTAK Helicopter Services crashed into the Salmon River near the Indianola Guard Station outside of North Fork, Idaho while fighting the Moose Fire. Both pilots on board were killed.
- 27 October 2022: Canadair CL-415 I-DPCN fire fighting plane impacted the side of a mountain near Linguaglossa in Italy immediately after dropping its load. Both pilots died in the accident.
- 6 February 2023: A Boeing 737-300 N619SW of Coulson Aviation crashed in Western Australia.
- 25 July 2023: A Canadair CL-215GR crashed in Greece while attempting to put out fires near Karystos killing its two crew members.
- July 10, 2024: An Air Tractor AT-802F "Fire Boss", a single engine airtanker set up for scooping operations & operated by Dauntless Air, crashed while attempting to scoop water from Hauser Reservoir north of Helena, Montana while fighting the Horse Gulch Fire. The pilot, the sole occupant of the aircraft, was killed.
- July 25, 2024: An Air Tractor AT-802A SEAT (Single Engine Air Tanker) crashed from what appeared to be a controlled flight onto terrain due to limited visibility while fighting the Falls Fire near Burns, Or. The pilot, the sole occupant of the aircraft, did not survive.
- September 20, 2026 - An Airbus AS332 L1 Super Puma helicopter (N332N) crashed while conducting a water drop on the Dome Fire, after collecting water from Ostrander Lake. Both pilots were killed.

== In popular culture ==
- The CGI movie Planes: Fire & Rescue depicts aerial firefighting.
- The plot of Steven Spielberg's 1989 remake movie Always centers around aerial firefighting.
- In the 2003 direct-to-video film Rescue Heroes: The Movie, Wendy Waters, Ariel Flyer, Sam Sparks, Hal E. Copter and firefighters of the Canadian Airborne Firefighters have responded to the major forest fire in Canada.
- The 2017 movie Only the Brave depicts several instances of aerial firefighting.
- A commonly circulated urban legend tells of a scuba diver being scooped out of the water by a firefighting aircraft and dropped onto a forest fire. This was later tested by Mythbusters, in Season 2, Episode 7 ("Scuba Diver/Car Capers") who found it to be impossible due to a person being unable to fit through the intake opening

== See also ==
- Glossary of wildfire terms
- Smokejumper
- Wildfire suppression
- Modular Airborne FireFighting System
- Aerial firefighting and forestry in southern Australia
