= Floyd H. Nolta =

American pilot

- Born: Floyd Harrison Nolta; February 24, 1900; Oakland, Oregon, U.S.
- Died: July 26, 1974 (aged 74); Willows, California, U.S.
- Occupation: Pilot
- Spouse: Jesse Claire Pritchett
- Children: 1

Floyd Harrison “Speed” Nolta (February 24, 1900 - July 26, 1974) was an accomplished American pilot who developed a method of sowing rice seed from an airplane, and later invented the first successful method of dropping water from an airplane for fighting forest fires. He served as an Army airplane mechanic during World War 1 and returned to serve as a pilot in the Army Air Forces during World War 2. He was a stunt pilot in Hollywood and a civic leader in Willows, California.

== Early life ==
Floyd Harrison Nolta, born February 24, 1900, in Oakland, Oregon, was the second of ten children born to George Lelvin Nolta and Arizona "Zona" Rees. George Nolta worked a variety of jobs and the family frequently moved around Oregon. Floyd Nolta completed three years of high school. By 1918 the family had moved to Willows. George Nolta's mother had lived in Monroeville, California in Colusa County, California in 1862. That area of Colusa County became part of Glenn County when Colusa County was divided in 1891.

== World War I ==
In September 1918, Nolta was living in Willows and working as a garage mechanic when he registered for the draft.

Nolta enlisted in the Army on November 4, 1918, and was sent to the Signal Corps Aviation School at Rockwell Field in Coronado, California. The Army put Nolta's mechanic skills to use as an aircraft mechanic for the Curtiss JN-4 “Jenny” airplanes being used to train pilots. One of the instructor pilots was Second Lieutenant Jimmy Doolittle. According to family lore, it was Doolittle who gave Nolta his first airplane ride and may have also given him his first flight lesson. After serving together, Nolta and Doolittle remained life-long friends and Doolittle often visited Willows to hunt with Floyd and his brother, Dale.

Nolta mustered out of the Army on March 27, 1919 and returned to his job as a mechanic in Willows. In 1926 he married Jesse Claire Pritchett (b. 1901, Georgia), a graduate of Humboldt State Normal School. Jesse worked as a teacher in schools in Glenn County.

== Aviation pioneer ==
Nolta completed his flying lessons during the early 1920s. Growing rice in the Sacramento Valley began in 1912 and it quickly became a major crop on both sides of the Sacramento River. Planting rice seed was a slow, labor-intensive job until Nolta invented a way of sowing the rice seed from an airplane. There is no known surviving record of the exact year but it may have been in 1928 when the first air strip was built in Willows on the location that is now the Glenn Medical Center. In his biography of his uncle, George Nolta wrote that Floyd seeded the Garnett Black property south of Willows in 1928 and that he sowed 8,000 acres that season. At the time Nolta owned a Curtis Jenny, the same aircraft he maintained in the Army. If Nolta did sow rice in 1928, then he was the first pilot to do so in California.

There is good evidence that he definitely did so in 1929 as there is a surviving photo of Nolta standing next to his Hisso Travel Air bi-plane. “Willows Flying Service”, Nolta's company name, is painted on the fuselage. Handwritten on the photo is, “Rice Planter #1, April 1, 1929, F. H. Nolta, Pilot.” Nolta placed a hopper in the front cockpit of his bi-plane and fashioned a method of releasing the seed below the fuselage which was then spread by the prop wash in a 50 feet (15 m) wide swath. A knob controlled the amount of seed being dispensed. The mechanism that Nolta invented is still in use by current ag pilots to dispense seed. A flagman stood on the levee at both ends of the field as Nolta flew a straight line at 25 feet (7.6 m) above ground. He could land on any flat roadway to refill the hopper. In 1931, 50,000 acres (20,000 ha) of rice were planted by airplane in the Sacramento Valley.

The original airport in Willows was replaced in 1929 when the U.S. Department of Commerce built the Willows-Glenn County Airport as an Intermediate Landing Field as part of the Seattle-Los Angeles Contracted Air Mail Route. The Department of Commerce Airways Division appointed Nolta as the manager of the new airport. On April 17, 1930 Nolta was sworn in as a special deputy to serve as Glenn County’s first flying officer. Each county appointed a flying officer to enforce aviation laws in the era before they came under federal jurisdiction.

Nolta was very involved in the Willows community serving on the boards and as an officer of the American Legion Baseball league, the Achaean Club of the Sacramento Valley, the American Legion Post and semi-pro football and baseball leagues. Nolta was one of the civic leaders who raised funds through the American Legion and the Achaean Club to purchase the Willows Airport from the Department of Commerce in 1932. Nolta continued as the manager of the airport and his Willows Flying Service occupied the first hangar to be built. Nolta staged annual air shows which became the largest ones in Northern California. As other ag flying services were based at the airport it became the busiest airport in Northern California other than those with commercial flights.

Nolta received national attention for his agricultural flying and inquiries arrived from around the world seeking his help. He employed his brothers, Dale and Loyal in both his flying business and at his Union 76 gas station. He took up auto racing and acquired the nickname of “Speed" Nolta. He continued to add aircraft to the Willows Flying Service fleet with more Travel Airs with both Hispano-Suiza and Wright engines. He used a Curtis-Wright Junior which had a forward cockpit and a rear pushed engine to hunt eagles from the air (legal in those days) to protect flocks of sheep and to scare migratory birds away from rice fields. He owned a Waco YOC which he used as a passenger charter plane. The Willows Flying Service provided flight instruction, charter flights, freight hauling, agricultural services and aircraft maintenance, featuring Stanavo Products. The Forest Service contracted for flying freight, including equipment drops in fire zones, aerial observation and reseeding after fires.

In 1940 Floyd and Jessie adopted an infant born in San Francisco and named him James Harrison Nolta. He was their only child.

== World War II ==
When the Army Air Forces took over the Willows Airport in 1942 as an Auxiliary Air Field for the Chico Field, the Willows Flying Service moved to their own land about four miles north of Willows.

In March 1942 the friendship between Nolta and Jimmy Doolittle was put to good use when Lieutenant Henry Miller, the U.S. Navy officer assigned to train the Doolittle Raiders Army pilots in short takeoff procedures, brought the pilots for final training and aircraft testing at the Willows-Glenn County Airport. They directly from Willows to Alameda Naval Air Station and deployment aboard USS Hornet (CV-8).

The Army Air Forces recalled Floyd Nolta in June 1942 and gave him a commission as a 2nd Lieutenant. His first assignment was to Mather Field in Sacramento as a navigator instructor. While at Mather, he learned to fly the Beechcraft AT-7 twin-engine airplane.

In October 1942, Lieutenant Colonel Paul Mantz assumed command of the 118th Base Unit, originally known as the First Motion Picture Unit. The unit, based at the Hal Roach Studios in Culver City, consisted of many well-known actors and other film production specialists and was tasked with making training and morale-boosting films. The unit also taught aerial combat photographers. The unit lacked experienced pilots so Mantz brought Frank Clarke and Speed Nolta into the unit. Mantz and Nolta had worked together on The Bride Came C.O.D. in 1941. Nolta was to be in charge of the flight line mechanics but he also flew as a stunt pilot.

During the 1944 production of Thirty Seconds Over Tokyo, Nolta flew a North American B-25 Mitchell bomber under the San Francisco-Oakland Bay Bridge to replicate what the author, Major Ted W. Lawson had done when he was en route to Alameda Naval Air Station in March 1942. Lawson, who was severely injured when his plane crashed in China, lived in Chico after the War where he and Nolta remained friends. Nolta also flew during the production of God is My Co-Pilot.

In April 1945 Nolta was given a special assignment to fly a B-25 Mitchell bomber for aerial photos as the funeral procession of President Franklin Roosevelt arrived in Hyde Park, NY for burial at his ancestral home. A radio broadcast described, “the lone B-25 flying overhead.”

Nolta was involved with another president during his time in the film unit as he served with Ronald Reagan. Nolta had a photo of Reagan which was signed, “Good luck, Speed and Sincere Best Wishes-Ronald Reagan. Nolta did not live to see Reagan elected as President.

Major Floyd Nolta left the Air Force on April 17, 1946.

== Stunt pilot ==
There is no record about how a Willows-based pilot became a Hollywood stunt pilot but Floyd Nolta did so before World War II. He was a stunt pilot for The Bride Came C.O.D., starring James Cagney and Bette Davis. Nolta also leased his Bellanca Senior Skyrocket (NC14700) airplane to Warner Brothers for the 1941 production. It was one of only twenty aircraft built. Much of the movie was shot in Death Valley and the plane was posed as thought it had crashed. Paul Mantz was also a stunt pilot for this production and Nolta may have been employed by Mantz’s United Air Services. The biography of Paul Mantz suggests that Mantz and Nolta had a rivalry but it is unknown why and it did not prevent Mantz from hiring Nolta as a stunt pilot.

Nolta remained in southern California after mustering out of the Air Force in 1946. He was joined by his wife and son at a home in Van Nuys.

In 1947 Nolta was a pilot for State of the Union, starring Spencer Tracy, Katharine Hepburn and Van Johnson. It was the second time working with Johnson as he portrayed Ted Lawson, the lead character in Thirty Seconds Over Tokyo. In a newspaper article about the growing importance of Metropolitan Airport in Van Nuys it mentioned that among the entities at the airport was California Aircraft Company headed by Bert White. The article said that White along his associates, Floyd Nolta and Frank Clarke, produced 60% of the flying sequences for the movies. During this production, M.G.M. sent a letter to the Screen Actors Guild asking that Nolta be enrolled in the Guild.

That year Nolta also worked on Buck Privates Come Home, starring Abbott and Costello. In 1948 he was credited along with Paul Mantz and Stan Reaver as providing aerials for Fighter Squadron, starring Edmond O’Brien and Robert Stack. Nolta’s last movie was Thunder in the East, starring Charles Boyer, Deborah Kerr and Alan Ladd. Nolta and Ladd had served together in the First Motion Picture Unit.

On November 11, 1950 Nolta was piloting a modified Lockheed P-38 Lightening over Sun Valley, when it stalled on approach to the Burbank Airport. It crashed in a residential neighborhood at the intersection of Cantera and Wheatland Streets leaving a 100-yard debris field. After hitting a eucalyptus tree and a power pole, it went completely through a house, picking up pieces of curtains and clothing but not injuring the sole occupant who was asleep at the time. The plane came to rest on the front porch of another house, without injuring the four occupants, who were eating lunch. Nolta was not so lucky and had to be extracted from the cockpit. He suffered a compound skull fracture and cuts and bruises to his extremities. When transferred to Cedars of Lebanon Hospital, he was described as being in poor condition.

One of the lasting mementos of Nolta’s time as a stunt pilot is a group photo taken when the Associated Motion Picture Pilots presented a trophy to Captain Chuck Yeager in 1947 after he broke the sound barrier. Nolta is in the picture along with other notable pilots including Yeager, Paul Mantz, Kirk Kerkorian (who later became a very successful businessman ), and Florence “Pancho” Barnes. Nolta had a membership card, dated in 1948 and signed by Pancho Barnes showing that he was a member of Happy Bottom Riding Club. Nolta’s membership may have been the result of his connection with Jimmy Doolittle as he, and Barnes, were good friends.

== Aerial fire fighting ==
Floyd and his family moved back to Willows sometime around 1953 where he rejoined the family’s Willows Flying Service which was then located on their own land, four miles north of Willows, near Artois.

In 1955 Joseph Bolles Ely, the Fire Control Officer for the Mendocino National Forest asked Nolta if he could perfect a way to make controlled drops of water on forest fires. There had been many attempts since the 1920s to find a way to do so but none had resulted in an accepted method. Nolta said to come back in a week. Similar to his invention twenty-five years earlier in sowing rice seed, he place a 170-gallon tank in the front cockpit of his Boeing-Stearman Model 75 bi-plane. He added an added a gate with hinges and a snap, and a pull rope, below the fuselage which was controlled from the cockpit.

A week later Al Edwards, the Mendocino NF warehouseman, went to Nolta’s airstrip. Vance Nolta flew the plane while Edwards and Floyd lit the dry grass along the airstrip on fire. Ely later wrote, “…Vance came over low and pulled the rope and put out the fire. The air tanker was born.”

The Noltas did water drops on fires in the Mendocino NF during the 1955 season. Their success led Ely to form the Mendocino Air Tanker Squad in 1956. The squadron, based at the Willows-Glenn County Airport, consisted for a local ag pilots flying Stearman and N3N bi-planes. They assisted on fires throughout the state and the unit was expanded the next year. Other agencies began to contract pilots on their own. The use of aircraft to drop water and retardant quickly became a valuable tool for fighting wild lands fire all over the world thanks to the innovation of Floyd Nolta.

The Willows Flying Service had 18 planes in 1956, including seven for seeding. It continued to thrive through the 1960s but then it began to diminish as the older Noltas could no longer fly and the business passed in and out of the hands of family members. It was finally dissolved in 2004 but the name is still owned by Dale Nolta’s son, Gregg. His son, Chris, is a third generation ag pilot based in Corcoran, California.

== Death ==
Floyd Nolta died in Willows on July 26, 1974, and he is buried in the local cemetery. As his nephew, George Nolta wrote in his biography, “Floyd’s career was a classic Horatio Alger story - poor boy makes good. He led a charmed life - flew with movie stars, partied with generals, and introduced many people to the joys of aviation, and set a few historical records along the way. He retained his roots in Willows, and left a long line of admiring friends and relatives.”
