= Evangelical council =

Evangelical Council may refer to:

- Evangelical Council for Financial Accountability, American church financial standards authority
- Evangelical Council of Venezuela
- Philippine Council of Evangelical Churches
- Church of England Evangelical Council

== See also ==
- Evangelical counsels, the virtues of poverty, chastity, and obedience
- Ecumenical council
