= CBS (disambiguation) =

CBS, formerly Columbia Broadcasting System, is an American broadcast television and radio network.

CBS, cbs, or CBs may also refer to:

== Businesses and organisations ==
=== Businesses ===
- CBS Corporation; its successor company, doing business as Paramount
- CBS Records (disambiguation), several uses
- Christian Broadcasting System, a South Korean Christian TV network
- Consolidated Broadcasting Systems, a former licensee of Bombo Radyo Philippines
- Coventry Building Society, a British building society based in Coventry
- Crusaders Broadcasting System, the owner of the radio station DWAD-AM in Metro Manila, Philippines

=== National organisations ===
- Centralne Biuro Śledcze Policji ('Central Investigation Bureau of Police'), a Polish police unit
- Statistics Netherlands (Dutch: Centraal Bureau voor de Statistiek), the Dutch national institute of statistics
- Israel Central Bureau of Statistics, the Israeli national institute of statistics
- Canadian Blood Services, a nonprofit charitable organization
- Central Broadcasting System, or Radio Taiwan International, the national broadcaster and international radio service of Taiwan

=== Educational organisations ===
- CBS, the name of several Christian Brothers Schools
- CBS International Business School, Germany
- Calcutta Boys' School, India
- Colonel Brown Cambridge School, Dehradun, India
- Columbia Business School, New York City, United States
- Copenhagen Business School, Denmark
- University of Minnesota College of Biological Sciences, United States
- Westerdijk Institute (formerly Centraalbureau voor Schimmelcultures), the Dutch institute of fungus studies

=== Religious organisations ===
- Campus Bible Study, of the University of New South Wales, Australia
- Campus by the Sea, Catalina Island, California, United States
- Confraternity of the Blessed Sacrament, an Anglican devotional society

== Science and technology ==
- CBS catalyst (Corey–Bakshi–Shibata catalyst), in organic chemistry
- CBS reduction (Corey–Bakshi–Shibata reduction), a chemical reaction
- CBS domain, a protein domain in molecular biology
- Corticobasal syndrome, a medical condition
- Charles Bonnet syndrome, a type of psychophysical visual disturbance
- Combined braking system, on a motorcycle or scooter
- Container-based sanitation, a toilet system
- Component-Based Servicing, a management feature new to Windows Vista operating system
- Concrete block structure, a building structure built from concrete masonry units
- Cystathionine beta synthase, an enzyme
- Credit-based shaper, in IEEE 802.1Qav time-sensitive networking

== Transportation ==
- Coatbridge Sunnyside railway station, Scotland (National Rail code: CBS)
- Columbus station, Wisconsin, United States (Amtrak code: CBS)

== Other uses ==
- Chronological Bible Storying, a method of orally communicating portions of the Bible
- Community Baboon Sanctuary, a wildlife reserve in Belize
- Conception Bay South, a town in Newfoundland and Labrador, Canada, also known as CBS
- Croatia Boat Show, a boat show in Split, Croatia
- Contrabassoon, a wind instrument one octave lower than the bassoon
- Citizens band, a land mobile radio system
- Cashinahua language (ISO 639-3 code: cbs)

== See also ==
- CBS-FM (disambiguation)
- CBS Television (disambiguation)
