= CBS station =

CBS station(s) may refer to:

- Television stations affiliated with the CBS TV network:
  - List of CBS television affiliates (by U.S. state)
  - List of CBS television affiliates (table)
  - CBS Television Stations, the group of CBS's owned and operated stations
- Train stations that have the station code "CBS":
  - Coatbridge Sunnyside railway station in Coatbridge, North Lanarkshire, Scotland
  - Columbus station, Columbus, Wisconsin, United States

== See also ==
- CBS (disambiguation)
