= WLW =

WLW may refer to:

== Media ==
- WLW (AM), a radio station (700 kHz) licensed to Cincinnati, Ohio, United States
- The following radio station founded or previously owned by the Crosley Broadcasting Corporation:
  - WLVQ, a radio station (96.3 FM) licensed to Columbus, Ohio, United States, which formerly held the WLWF ("WLW-F") call sign
- The following television stations founded or previously owned by the Crosley Broadcasting Corporation:
  - WLWT (channel 5 analog/35 digital) licensed to Cincinnati, Ohio, originally rendered as "WLW-T"
  - WTHR (channel 13 analog/13 digital) licensed to Indianapolis, Indiana, which held the WLWI ("WLW-I") call sign from 1957 until 1976
  - WCMH (channel 4 analog/14 digital) licensed to Columbus, Ohio, which held the WLWC ("WLW-C") call sign from 1949 until 1976
  - WDTN (channel 2 analog/50 digital) licensed to Dayton, Ohio, which held the WLWD ("WLW-D") call sign from 1949 until 1976
  - WXIA (channel 11 analog/10 digital) licensed to Atlanta, Georgia, which held the WLWA ("WLW-A") call sign from 1953 until 1962
- KALL, a radio station (700 AM) licensed to Salt Lake City, Utah, which held the KWLW call sign (a reflection of being on the same frequency as WLW) from 1997 until 1999
- DWLW, a radio station owned by the Manila Broadcasting Company licensed to Lucena City in the Philippines.

== Transport ==
- Welwyn North railway station (National Rail station code: WLW), Hertfordshire, England
- Willows-Glenn County Airport (IATA: WLW), Glenn County, California

== Other uses ==
- Woolworths (United Kingdom) (LSE and NYSE: WLW)
- World League Wrestling, an independent professional wrestling promotion based in Eldon, Missouri
- Windows Live Writer, a desktop blog-publishing application
- Woman loving women (Sapphism)
