= CBS Records =

CBS Records may refer to:

- CBS Records, a former name of Sony Music, a global music company
- CBS/Sony, a former name of Sony Music Entertainment Japan, a Japanese music company division of Sony
- CBS Records International, a label for Columbia Records recordings released outside North America from 1962 to 1990
- CBS Records (2006), founded in 2006 by CBS Corporation for recordings featured its programs
- CBS Associated Records, a CBS imprint label in the 1980s to early 1990s
- CBS Masterworks Records, the former name of Sony Classical Records
- CBS Discos, the former name of Sony Music Latin

== See also ==
- CBS (disambiguation)
