= Rattlesnake Fire =

1953 wildfire in Northern California

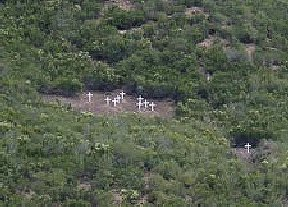
- Memorial crosses at the site of the 1953 Rattlesnake Fire
- Date: July 9, 1953 –; July 11, 1953; (3 days)
- Location: Powder House Canyon, Mendocino National Forest, California
- Coordinates: 39°39′19″N 122°38′10″W

Statistics
- Burned area: 1,300 acres (526 ha; 2 sq mi; 5 km^{2})

Impacts
- Deaths: 15

Ignition
- Cause: Arson
- Perpetrator: Stan Pattan

Map
- Location within Northern California

The Rattlesnake Fire was a wildfire started by arsonist Stanford Pattan on July 9, 1953, in Powder House Canyon on the Mendocino National Forest in northern California. The wildfire killed one Forest Service employee and 14 volunteer firefighters from the New Tribes Mission, and burned over 1,300 acres (530 ha) before it was controlled on July 11, 1953. It became and remains to this day a well-known firefighting textbook case on fatal wildland fires.

== Background ==
The area near the fire's origin was covered in overgrown chaparral that had been growing without any burning for 40 years, since 1911.

== Fire origin ==
The arsonist, Stanford Pattan, started two fires, one on private land and the other along Alder Springs Road inside the national forest boundary. He was later convicted and sentenced on two counts of arson.

== Incident ==
The first fire was quickly suppressed by responding firefighters. The second fire continued burning uphill in Rattlesnake Canyon; it was reported that afternoon and numerous fire crews from the Forest Service and the state responded, along with a pick-up crew hired from the New Tribes Mission at Fouts Springs. By late evening the fire was nearing containment. At about 9 p.m., however, as detailed in John N. Maclean's 2018 book River of Fire: The Rattlesnake Fire and the Mission Boys, the wind picked up, reversed direction, and poured downhill.

Fifteen firefighters were burned to death as they tried to outrun the fire through the dense chaparral.

== Aftermath and investigation ==
As a consequence of the fire, there were major changes to wildland fire training, firefighting safety standards, and overall awareness of how weather affects fire behavior. The 1953 Rattlesnake Fire was one of the incidents that culminated in the 1957 Report to the Chief (the Report of the Task Force to Recommend Action to Reduce the Chances of Men Being Killed by Burning While Fighting Fire).

Pattan later pleaded guilty to two counts of willful burning and was sentenced to 20 years in prison. He was released after serving three years, and died in 2009.
