= Numonohi =

New Tribes Mission headquarters in Papua New Guinea

Numonohi is the former name for the Ethnos360 headquarters centre in Papua New Guinea. In 2000, the centre changed its name from Numonohi to Lapilo at the request of the local nationals. Numonohi facilitates the support and coordination of Bible translation, church planting and medical work for New Tribes Mission throughout the Papua New Guinea mainland.

The Numonohi centre hosts Numonohi Christian Academy, which began as a missionary boarding school in 1966. The school has since developed into a K-12 international school which currently educates approximately 100 students both international and from the local community. The centre also hosts a store, post office, carpentry and mechanical shops, administration buildings, dorms, both medical and dental centres, a gymnasium as well as outdoor basketball/tennis courts and roughly 45 houses.

Numonohi is a word from the local dialect which means "rubbish land", an appropriate name for land that was not highly valued when it was originally leased to the mission organization. The name stuck, but NTM has transformed this land into a beautiful community over the years. However, with the rise of crime in PNG, missionaries have also become targets. Due to many incidents over the years a security fence was erected to protect the missionaries. Before the eight-foot chain-link fence was built it was not uncommon for neighbouring tribes to assemble on the soccer field and launch their spears and arrows at one another.

Numonohi's elevation is slightly over 5,200 feet and is located at Lapilo south of Goroka, the provincial capital.
