= Sophie Muller (missionary) =

American Protestant missionary and Bible translator (1910–1995)

- Born: 1910; New York City, U.S.
- Died: 1995 (aged 84–85); United States
- Education: National Academy of Design, National Bible Institute
- Occupations: Missionary, Bible translator
- Years active: 1944–1990s
- Organization(s): New Tribes Mission (until 1975), independent
- Known for: Evangelization of indigenous populations in the Colombian Amazon region, translation of the New Testament

Sophie Muller (1910 – 1995) was an American Protestant missionary and Bible translator who worked extensively with indigenous populations in the Amazon regions of Colombia and Venezuela. Arriving in Colombia in April 1944, Muller ventured into the departments of Vaupés, Guainía, and Guaviare, and spent over four decades evangelizing in the basins of the Inírida and Atabapo rivers to groups such as the Curripacos, Puinaves, Piapocos, and Cubeos.

She translated the New Testament into several indigenous languages and founded hundreds of local churches. Her legacy remains highly controversial; while she is credited with introducing literacy to marginalized tribes, improving their hygiene conditions, and protecting them from abusive rubber tappers, she also actively eradicated traditional indigenous religious practices and fiercely opposed both the Catholic Church and the secular education efforts of the Colombian government.

== Early life and education ==
Sophie Muller was born in New York City in 1910 to a German Catholic father and a Protestant mother. In the early 1940s, she studied commercial art at the National Academy of Design and worked as a commercial artist (and supposedly, briefly, as a reporter for The New York Times). Although initially ambivalent about religion, she met street evangelists in New York and subsequently enrolled in a three-year program at the National Bible Institute. Inspired to reach isolated populations, she joined the newly founded New Tribes Mission in 1944, preparing for her mission with linguistics and jungle survival courses.

== Missionary work in Colombia ==
Entering Colombia in April 1944 on a visa for foreign professionals, she was welcomed in Bogotá by two art school friends. She then initially stayed with medical missionary Katherine Morgan in Pasto to learn Spanish. With the help of the Worldwide Evangelization Crusade, she secured a permanent visa. In December of that same year, she embarked on a long journey by light aircraft and boats to the rubber-tapping town of Cejal, to contact the Curripaco people in the Isana River region.

To teach the indigenous populations to read and write, Muller used the Laubach method, creating syllable charts to associate letters with familiar images. Within months, she successfully introduced bilingual primers and began translating catechisms and Bible stories.

Her influence grew rapidly, aided by events that the indigenous people perceived as supernatural. Early on, Curripaco authorities locked her up and, according to local accounts and her own memoirs, tested her by forcing her to drink the liquid of a poisonous sacred vine. After agonizing and suffering hallucinations for 48 hours, Muller survived, leading the villagers to view her as a divine figure.

Leveraging this authority, Muller encouraged converts to abandon their traditional customs, throw sacred objects into the river, and stop participating in ceremonial dances. In addition to religion, she taught them hygiene standards that improved their health, such as prohibiting the sharing of the same gourd (totuma) to prevent contagion. Over time, she extended her efforts to the Puinave, Piapoco, Guahibo, and Cubeo peoples. She also expanded briefly into Brazil to work with the Baniwa people before facing resistance from the authorities.

By 1965, Muller had overseen the establishment of some 200 native churches and translated the New Testament into several tribal languages. Vichada authorities recognized her vast influence, noting that up to 30,000 of the region's 37,000 inhabitants had converted to evangelical Christianity under her teaching. She led an extremely ascetic life, waking up at four in the morning to pray and consuming minimal amounts of food. She distrusted other white missions and relied exclusively on the indigenous people she educated herself to act as her missionaries.

== Conflicts and controversies ==
Muller's work was highly disruptive to both traditional indigenous structures and the established powers in Colombia. She firmly believed that Satan manifested in indigenous dances and shamanic stones. Although she was criticized for destroying native culture, she also fiercely protected her followers from white settlers and rubber barons, attempting to segregate them from Colombian society to prevent exploitation and moral corruption. Her presence radically transformed communities: she completely eradicated alcohol consumption and billiards, and established a lifestyle where children began wearing Western shoes and dresses.

During La Violencia, Muller and her converts faced persecution by the military and rival factions. In 1953, the government of Gustavo Rojas Pinilla renewed an agreement with the Vatican, granting the Catholic Church exclusive control over indigenous territories and forcing Muller to temporarily relocate her base to San Fernando de Atabapo, Venezuela. Catholic prelates continually denounced her anti-Catholic proselytization, while Muller, in turn, destroyed Catholic medals and provoked conflicts between native Protestant and Catholic families.

The dynamic shifted during the National Front era. The government began implementing agrarian reforms and standardizing education in the territories. Muller rejected secular state teachers, claiming they brought "Karl Marx" and moral ruin to indigenous youth. New concordats with the Vatican and the arrival of the Summer Institute of Linguistics also changed the landscape of the Amazon.

Muller also opposed indigenous political movements, refusing to support the Guahibos during the 1970 Planas Plan land struggles because she believed the cooperative leaders were communist agitators. In 1976, a Colombian military commission concluded that Muller's influence kept indigenous peoples in "prostration, misery, and ignorance," demanding an end to her activities.

== Later life and death ==
In 1975, Muller resigned from the New Tribes Mission to work independently. In her later years, her influence waned as native groups began to return to their traditional customs, and the rise of the FARC guerrilla group introduced new dangers and ideologies to the region. She eventually relocated to the United States, where she died of stomach cancer in 1995 at the age of 83.

Anthropologists and historians are highly divided on Muller's legacy. Critics emphasize her role in eradicating traditional indigenous cultures and imposing a rigid, authoritarian puritanism. Conversely, her supporters argue that she instilled pride in marginalized people, successfully broke the violent exploitation of the rubber barons, and created a peaceful, literate indigenous society.
