= Ethnos360 =

Christian mission organization

- Founded: 1942
- Founder: Paul Fleming
- Type: Evangelical Missions Agency
- Purpose: Church planting among unreached tribal people
- Headquarters: 312 W First St, Sanford, Florida
- Location: Sanford, Florida, US
- Region served: Worldwide
- Key people: Steve Sanford (CEO)
- Revenue: $67 million in 2020
- Employees: 3,300
- Website: ethnos360.org

Ethnos360, formerly known as New Tribes Mission (NTM), is an international, theologically evangelical Christian mission organization based in Sanford, Florida, United States.

Ethnos360 sends missionaries from local churches around the world to Latin America, West Africa, Southeast Asia and the Arctic. New Tribes Mission is also a member of the Forum of Bible Agencies International.

== Focus and beliefs ==
The mission's focus is on groups where no translation of the Bible exists. When such a group is identified, Ethnos360 first attempts to make contact and establish a relationship. Then, missionaries are sent to learn the language and the culture of the native people, while further developing relationships and providing humanitarian aid. The missionaries translate biblical literature into the indigenous language, as well as teach the group how to read and write in their own language. The professed goal, however, is to establish fully functioning churches that operate independently of missionaries, which "in turn reach out to their own people and to neighboring tribes".

The core belief of Ethnos360 is "sola scriptura", accompanied by a historical-grammatical hermeneutic in interpreting the scriptures. This emphasis on "word by word inspiration" leads to literal belief "in the fall of man resulting in his complete and universal separation from God and his need of salvation". Those who die unsaved go to "unending punishment" (hence the mandate to evangelize those without access to the gospel). Additionally, Ethnos360 is a classically dispensational organization, subscribing to the "imminent ... pretribulation and pre-millennial return" of Jesus Christ to earth.

== History ==
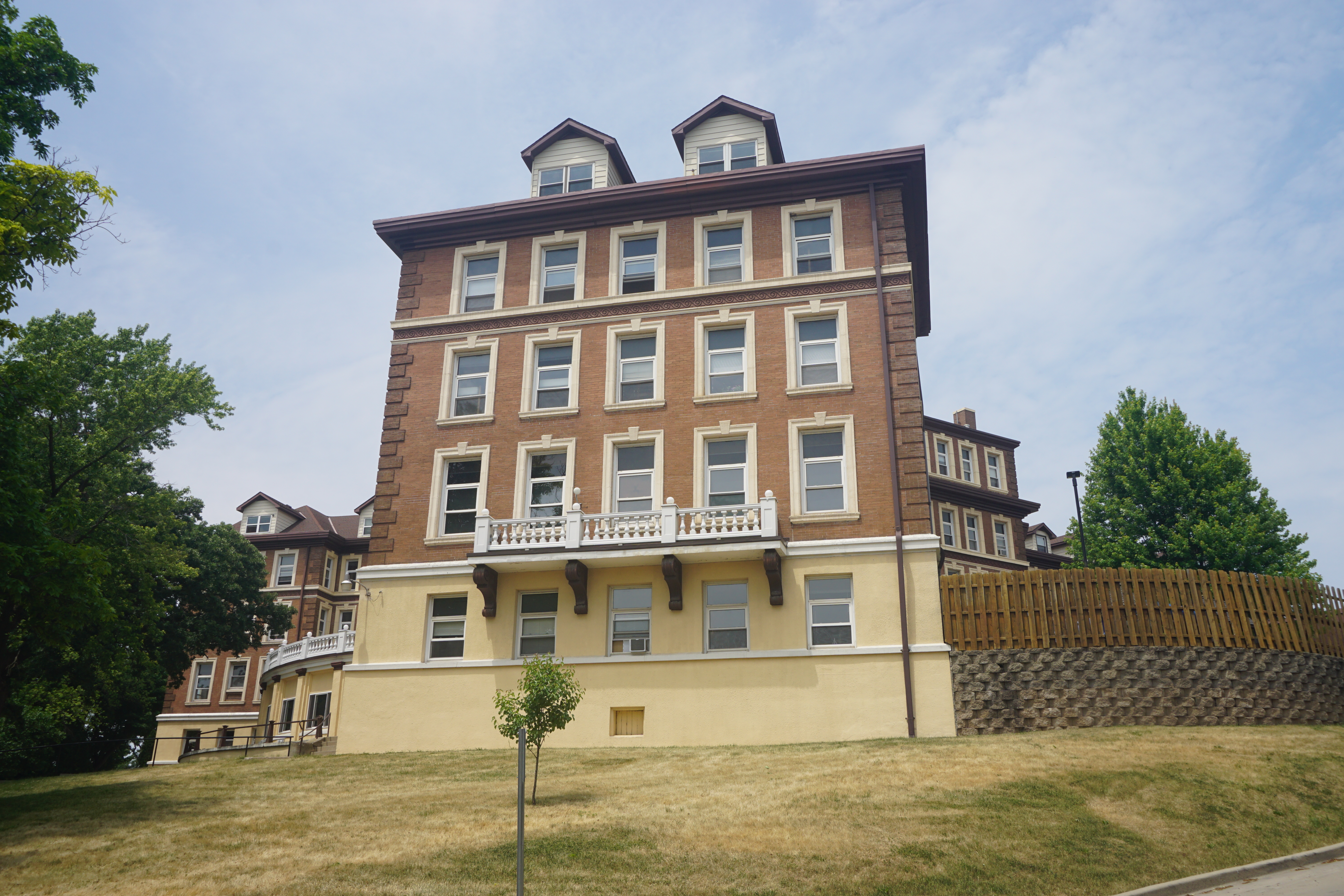
The Ethnos360 Bible Institute (formerly the Resthaven Hotel) in Waukesha, Wisconsin

=== Founding ===
NTM was founded by Paul Fleming, from Los Angeles, in 1942. In the 1930s Fleming had worked as a missionary in the British colony of Malaya. Initially, NTM was based in a former nightclub in Chicago.

In 1943 NTM started publishing its magazine Brown Gold. In 1944/45, NTM moved headquarters to Chico, California. Shortly thereafter it established a "boot camp" (missionary training facility) at Fouts Springs, California.

=== Early activity expansion and associated personnel deaths ===
The organization sent out its first group in November 1942 to Bolivia. On January 12, 1944, the startling news came back that five of the men were missing. Details were revealed years later and, according to Time magazine, these five NTM missionaries were killed by aboriginal Bolivians in 1943.

In June 1950 the first plane bought by NTM crashed in Venezuela, killing all 15 people on board. The second plane bought by NTM crashed in November of the same year at Mount Moran in Grand Teton National Park while on its way to bring missionaries abroad, killing all 21 aboard, including spouses, several children and founder Paul Fleming.

In July 1953, 14 NTM members serving as volunteer firefighters died in what became known as the Rattlesnake Fire about 25 miles (40 kilometers) north of Fouts Springs, California in the Mendocino National Forest.

=== Personnel deaths by guerrillas in Colombia and the Philippines ===
In the late 20th century and the beginning of the 21st, a number of New Tribes Mission personnel have been killed by guerrillas in different parts of the world.

- In 1993 members of the FARC guerrilla movement abducted three New Tribes Mission missionaries from a village in Panama and brought them to Colombia where they were killed in 1996.
- In 1994 two other missionaries were killed after being taken at gunpoint from an NTM school in Colombia.
- In May 2001 Abu Sayyaf rebels in the Philippines kidnapped a NTM pilot, Martin Burnham, and his wife, Gracia, as they celebrated a wedding anniversary. In June 2002, during a rescue attempt by government troops, Martin Burnham was killed and Gracia Burnham received non-fatal gunshot wounds to the leg.

== Training program ==
Ethnos360 requires all candidates to complete a training program. The training program can take up to four years to complete. In the US, this training culminates in an unaccredited bachelor's degree. Major Bible colleges such as Moody Bible Institute and Columbia International University recognize credits and degrees from Ethnos360.

The first phase of the training consists of basic Bible education. This phase lasts two years. In the US, this training takes place at the Ethnos360 Bible Institute, in Waukesha, Wisconsin, formerly called New Tribes Bible Institute. This portion of the training program is often waived for candidates possessing previous Bible training from accredited Bible colleges.

The second phase of the program involves extensive study in cross-cultural communication, church planting, and linguistic analysis. It also lasts two years as candidates study advanced linguistic techniques, learning how to alphabetize unwritten languages and translate the Bible. Formerly called "Boot Camp" this phase also emphasizes basic living skills necessary for survival in undeveloped areas of the world (e.g. constructing and cooking from clay stoves, building jungle shelters, etc.). In the US, this takes place at the Ethnos360 Missionary Training Center in Camdenton, Missouri.

An NTM Canadian training center exists in Durham, Ontario. Similar training programs exist in other countries, including Brazil, Germany, Mexico and United Kingdom.

== Aviation program ==
Ethnos360 operates an aviation program known as Ethnos360 Aviation, with the purpose of reaching more rural areas. Pilots are trained at a facility in McNeal, Arizona. It is required that they have at least 300 hours of pilot-in-command (PIC) experience, a commercial pilot certificate, and mechanic certification. Ethnos360 Aviation also flies and operates in the United States, Brazil, the Philippines, Papua New Guinea, and the Asia Pacific region. Fixed-wing aircraft, such as the Quest Kodiak, and helicopters, like the Robinson R66, are flown. In January 2020, Ethnos360 raised $2 million to purchase a Robinson R66 helicopter for use in Brazil.

== Evangelistic approach ==
New Tribes Mission's strategy for "church planting" starts with language acquisition. NTM believes that individuals should have access to the Bible and its teachings in their native languages and refuses to teach in English or local trade languages. Several unwritten languages on the verge of extinction have been given new leases of life, because of missionary efforts to reduce them to writing and to teach their speakers in literacy.

After becoming proficient in the local languages, NTM missionaries initiate in-depth Bible studies with interested parties. Rather than distributing tracts or showing the "Jesus" film (popular methods among many organizations), NTM focuses on teaching through the Scriptures chronologically. Missionaries begin with the Genesis account of creation and follow the storyline of the Bible through to the story of Jesus Christ and the teachings of the New Testament. This approach is necessary because most of the cultures in which they work have no exposure to any biblical teaching whatsoever, and therefore require solid grounding on the foundational principles of the Old Testament before they can be introduced to the New Testament Gospel.

This chronological curriculum consists of 50 lessons and is called "Building on Firm Foundations". It was written by Trevor McIlwain and Nancy Everson and originally published in 1985.

== Recognition ==
Ethnos360 is listed by Ministry Watch on the Shining Lights 'Top 30' Exemplary Ministries. MinistryWatch.com, in response to requests for a list of Christian ministries that are among the best to which donors can give with confidence, has released a "Top 30" list of ministries as the latest MinistryWatch.com Shining Light profile. Ethnos360 is one of those Top 30 Shining Lights.

== Criticism and controversy ==
=== Criticism of cultural change ===
Critics contend that the New Tribes Mission and other evangelist groups "hunt down primitive Indians and destroy their culture in the name of converting them to Christianity". Paul Gifford, Professor of Religion at the University of London, accused NTM of changing indigenous cultures and representing US foreign policy interests in countries where they were active. Due to such claims, in 1989, NTM was investigated, and subsequently cleared, of any wrongdoing by the all-party Parliamentary Human Rights Committee in Britain. However, a letter of protest signed by Bishop Trevor Huddleston, Lord Avebury, Chairman of the Parliamentary Human Rights Group; Rabbi Richard Rosen; and Survival International President Robin Hanbury-Tenison, called on the Mission to halt its controversial activities and respect tribal religion and culture. According to Stephen Corry, Director of Survival International, some missionaries do an enormous amount of work to help indigenous peoples and defend their rights, while others do great harm. He says he is not anti-missionary and that he himself and his organization have worked together with countless missionaries. He recalls how a senior member of a very large mission organisation personally told him that their critiques published in the 1970s had stimulated change for the better within his organisation.

=== Deaths of members of the Ayoreo Totobiegosode tribe ===
In 1986, indigenous Paraguayans of the Ayoreo Totobiegosode tribe were allegedly forced into trucks by another tribal group, driven to a camp set up by NTM, and subsequently endured years of unpaid servitude, leading to numerous deaths from diseases introduced by the missionaries. In 1987, the director of the mission, Fred Sammons, responded to these allegations, claiming that "The Indians live in fear, in fear of evil spirits and in fear of violent death because it's in their culture to kill. But when they come with us, they accept a new way of life ... We never force our religion on anyone." Sammons also wrote "There are people who like to say that the Ayoreos are happy living in the jungle ... Yet if you ask anyone who has had a taste of civilization if he wants to go back and live like he used to, the answer is always a very positive 'No'." Former Paraguayan minister of culture Ticio Escobar, claimed that Ayoreos who were brought out of their isolation exhibited "all of the side effects of losing one's cultural identity: alcoholism, social disorganisation, apathy, violence, suicide, prostitution, and marginalization".

=== Nukak de-isolation ===
In 1981, in what is now the Río Puré National Park in Colombia, NTM missionaries interacted with the previously uncontacted Nukak people. Gift-giving led the Nukak to seek contact with settlers nearby. Combined with encroachment from guerrilla groups and coca growers, these later interactions with the outside world resulted in cultural instability and disease. Many members of the tribe now receive government subsidies in San José del Guaviare.

=== Political controversy in Venezuela ===
In October 2005, the BBC reported that Venezuelan president Hugo Chávez had announced his intention to expel New Tribes Mission from Venezuela. He accused NTM of imperialism, collaboration with the CIA, violation of Venezuela's national sovereignty, and illegally flying into and out of the country. He also attacked the group for living in lavish encampments they had constructed next to poverty-stricken villages.

Responding to the allegations, NTM said, "Any kind of air travel we do, we always do within the guidelines of what the government allows. We always file reports." With respect to "luxury" living, they "live in homes that make it possible for them to continue the work that they do. The homes that they live in are very simple."

On November 3, 2005, hundreds of Venezuelan indigenous people marched in Puerto Ayacucho protesting against the expulsion of NTM by the Venezuelan government. Although the Venezuelan constitution recognized their collective ownership of ancestral lands in 1999, "poverty remains acute among many Indian communities and many protesters said the missionaries were the only people who have tangibly improved their lives."

=== Sexual abuse ===
A 2010 report by G.R.A.C.E.(Godly Response to Abuse in the Christian Environment), an organization dedicated to helping Christian organizations deal with abuse, documented reports of sexual, physical, emotional abuse at the Fanda boarding school operated by NTM for the children of NTM workers in the country of Senegal during the 1980s and 1990s. in 2023 an investigation was done by the Independent Historical Allegation Review Team (IHART), requested by Ethnos360. The investigation examined historical allegations of child abuse at the New Tribes Mission fields of Colombia, Indonesia¹, Mexico, the Philippines, Thailand, the United States of America (U.S.), Venezuela, and West Brazil

- A part-time instructor with New Tribes Mission was charged in 2006 with molesting two boys.
- A youth pastor faced charges of possessing images of child abuse in 2008.
- A woman sued New Tribes in 2011, alleging that she had been raped by a worker associated with the group.
- A missionary was arrested at Orlando International Airport on June 4, 2013. Warren Scott Kennell admitted to molesting four children in Brazil, authorities told WESH-TV, and two images of child abuse were found on his computer. In July 2014, he was sentenced to 58 years in prison for the sexual abuse of several Katukina girls, and for the possession of more than 940 images of child abuse on his hard drive.

== See also ==
- Evangelical Council of Venezuela
- Numonohi
- Sophie Muller (missionary)
