= Evangelical Council of Venezuela =

Christian organization

The Evangelical Council of Venezuela is an organization of evangelical mission agencies in Venezuela. Samuel Olson is the current president, with José Piñero as vice president. The group (unsuccessfully) defended the New Tribes Mission after announcement of their expulsion from Venezuela in 2005 by Hugo Chávez.
