= Fouts Springs, California =

Unincorporated community in California, United States

Fouts Springs
- Unincorporated community
- Location in California Fouts Springs (the United States)
- Coordinates: 39°21′12″N 122°39′54″W
- Country: United States
- State: California
- County: Colusa
- Elevation: 1,713 ft (522 m)

Fouts Springs is a set of springs that became a resort in the 19th century in Colusa County, California, United States. It lies at an elevation of 1713 feet (522 m). It is best known for being the headquarters of the New Tribes Mission. The post office was established in 1882, closed in 1913, reopened in 1945, closed again in 1947, reopened in 1950 and closed for good in 1956. The place is named for John F. Fouts who discovered the springs here in 1873. The springs supported a resort capable of hosting 150 guests that operated here in the early part of the 20th century. Fouts Spring water was being bottled for sale as drinking water as of 1909.
