= CBS-FM =

CBS-FM may refer to:

- WCBS-FM
- KCBS-FM
- CBS FM Buganda, a radio station in Uganda
