= Willows-Glenn County Airport =

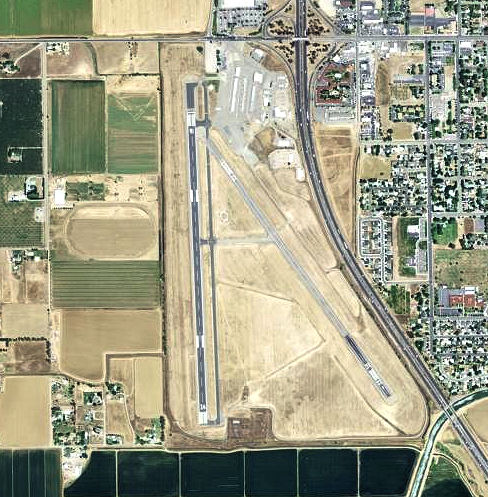
- USGS 2006 orthophoto
- IATA: WLW; ICAO: KWLW; FAA LID: WLW

Summary
- Airport type: Public
- Owner: Glenn County
- Serves: Willows, California
- Elevation AMSL: 141 ft / 43 m
- Coordinates: 39°30′57″N 122°13′02″W

Map
- Location of airport in California

Runways
Direction	Length		Surface
Direction	ft	m	Surface
13/31	3,788	1,155	Asphalt
16/34	4,125	1,257	Asphalt

Statistics (2021)
- Aircraft operations: 29,500
- Based aircraft: 39
- Source: Federal Aviation Administration

Willows-Glenn County Airport (IATA: WLW, ICAO: KWLW, FAA LID: WLW) is a county-owned, public-use airport located one nautical mile (2 km) west of the central business district of Willows, a city in Glenn County, California, United States. This airport is included in the National Plan of Integrated Airport Systems for 2011–2015, which categorized it as a general aviation facility. It is also known as Willows-Glenn Airport.

== History ==
Willows-Glenn County Airport dates to October 1928 when the Airways Division of the U.S. Department of Commerce selected a location west of Willows as an Intermediate Landing Field. The County of Glenn purchased an 80-acre tract of land for approximately $2000 and the City of Willows purchased the adjoining 80-acre tract of land for $2092.80. The land was leased to the Commerce Department Airways Division, which put up an additional $8000 for construction and equipment. Willows-Glenn County Airport was part of the San Francisco to Redding section of the Los Angeles-Seattle Contract Air Mail Route 8 (CAM-8). As the twelfth beacon north of San Francisco/Oakland it was designated as Beacon #12, “12 SF-S Willows DOCILF.”

As an Intermediate Landing Field, the airport originally consisted only of this 51-foot steel tower, with an adjacent shed and concrete directional arrow, a primitive north–south grass runway, and field lighting. The airport lighting was completed by January 10, 1929. There is no known record of when the concrete arrow and shed were removed. The beacon tower remains in its original location and is still used to the airport's rotating beacon. It is the only 51-foot Contracted Air Mail Route tower still in use in California at its original airport. Illumination at the Willows Airport was provided by a 1000-watt lightbulb and a two-foot in diameter mirror producing 1,000,000 candlepower of light, capable of being seen for fifteen to forty miles. The Willows Airport beacon and field lights were powered by electricity from Pacific Gas & Electric Company.

The original rotating beacon at the Willows Airport was 24 inches in diameter and flashed a single clear light every six seconds. In addition to the beacon, the tower was also equipped with green course lights. Willows is located about 120 miles north of San Francisco, putting it in the second 100-mile section between San Francisco and Redding so it was assigned the designation “2.” Accordingly, the course lights at Willows flashed “U” (dot, dot, dash) representing “2.”

As an Intermediate Landing Field, the Willows Airport was also equipped with 15-watt clear bulbs fixtures placed every 300 feet along the edge of the runway and green lights at opposite ends of the runway to aid pilots in a nighttime landing. Willows Airport was described in the 1931 DOC Airways Guide: "Willows—Department of Commerce Intermediate Landing Field site 12 San Francisco to Seattle Airway. One and one-half miles W. Altitude. 140 feet. Irregular shape, 85 acres, 2,781 by 2500 feet, sod, level, natural drainage. Directional arrow marked “12 SF-S.” Pole line to N. Beacon, boundary, approach and obstruction lights. Beacon 24-inch rotating, with green course lights flashing characteristic “2” (. . -). No servicing facilities."

The Willows Airport tower, completed in late 1928, was manufactured by the International Derrick and Equipment Company (IDECO) of Columbus, Ohio.

The growing interest in aviation in the late 1920s prompted Glenn County citizens to embrace the idea of the U.S. Department of Commerce funding an airport in Willows. It was with a great deal of pride that they dedicated their airport with a two-day celebration in June 1929. From the outset, the Aeronautics Branch was unhappy with the Willows Airport runway because it was subject to flooding during the winter, prompting the DOC to threaten to move the airport elsewhere. Not wanting to lose their airport, Glenn County citizens held fundraisers, including a local production of Gilbert & Sullivan's The Mikado, to improve the runway. Concern also prompted the Achaean Club of Willows and the local American Legion post to raise enough funds to purchase the airport from the federal government. Later in that decade the ownership of the airport was turned over to Glenn County.

As an Intermediate Landing Field, use of the airport was limited to emergency landings. After the service clubs took over in 1932, the airport was open to all aviation uses. The airport was officially dedicated on September 9, 1933.

The first decade of the Willows Airport was closely connected to Floyd H. Nolta, a local civic leader, businessman, and pilot. He was selected by the Aeronautics Bureau as the manager of the airport. He served as the President of the Achaean Association and was Glenn County's first Flying Officer. In 1928, Nolta perfected a method to drop rice seed and fertilizer from an airplane. The cultivation of rice in the Sacramento Valley began in 1908 near Biggs (Butte County) when it was determined that a Japanese variety of medium-grain rice would do well in the region. Cultivating rice was very labor-intensive, requiring the field to be prepared and then rice seed and dry fertilizer spread by tractor or animal-drawn farm implements. The field was flooded, hopefully before migratory birds ate the rice seed. Nolta mounted a hopper in the cockpit of his Jenny JN-4 biplane. A sliding valve with a threaded knob allowed him to measure precise amounts of fertilizer and seed that dropped from the hopper into a box. The wash from the propeller spread the product over a 50-foot swath. Nolta's method vastly improved rice propagation, leading to an entire industry of ag (agriculture) pilots seeding and fertilizing rice and other crops throughout the North Sacramento Valley. Nolta's method allowed the field to be flooded before the seed was dropped, preventing any loss to birds. It also allowed a field to be planted much more quickly and economically than the previous labor-intensive method. By 1937, there were 130,000 acres of rice under cultivation. Modern ag pilots still use the same device perfected by Nolta in 1928. In addition to remaining as the airport manager, Nolta, along with his brothers, Vance Nolta and Dale Nolta, established the Willows Flying Service, which operated from the first hangar built at the airport. They were soon joined by other agricultural flying services.

With extensive use by agricultural and other types of aviation, Willows Airport was able to thrive, even during the depths of the Great Depression. It became the busiest airport in northern California, other than those with passenger service. Air shows became annual events and were some of the largest held in northern California. Willows Airport was a beneficiary of the Roosevelt Administration's investments in public works. In 1934, the airport received $5,000 in funds from the short-lived Civil Works Administration (CWA) to build a hangar. In 1935, Willows Airport was among 250 airports to receive funds from the Public Works Administration (PWA) with the $10,819 going towards hangar and runway improvements. An additional 125 acres were added in 1940, and a second runway was built by the Army Air Forces in 1941 in preparation for taking over the airport as an auxiliary airfield during World War II. In October 1941, the Sacramento construction firm, A. Tiechert & Sons Inc., was awarded a $140,000 contract by the Army to build the new runway.

WORLD WAR II

During the final days of March 1942, the North American B-25 Mitchell bombers assigned to a squadron under the command of Lt. Col. James Doolittle were undergoing final preparations at the Sacramento Air Depot (SAD) located at McClellan Field in Sacramento. Alterations to the bomber's carburetors had been made to enable the planes to fly the long distance required for the mission. Due to the highly secretive nature of this mission, the mechanics at SAD were not aware of that and changed the carburetor settings back to the factory recommendations.[1] Lt. Col. Doolittle ordered the settings to be redone and wanted an additional test of the planes. It was impossible to conduct the short-field takeoff maneuvers at McClellan Field in front of hundreds of workers, so arrangements were made to use the Willows Airport.

During World War I, Jimmy Doolittle was an Army flying instructor at Rockwell Field in Coronado . Floyd Nolta was a mechanic in the same unit, and he and Doolittle became lifelong friends and bird hunting companions in the Willows area.

Lt. Henry L. Miller USN was the naval officer assigned to teach the Army Air Forces pilots how to conduct short take-off procedures. In 1971, Rear Admiral Miller USN (Retired) gave an oral history about his long career in the Navy. In his recollection of his time assigned to the Doolittle Raid, he said, "We put the planes in the depot there at Sacramento to get a recheck, get them all set to go aboard the carrier, and as one plane would come out of that sort of interim overhaul period there, I’d take it up with the crew to Willows, California, to a field there and give them take-offs at Willows. Then, the last day, Jimmy Doolittle said, “Well we’ll finish up at Willows then we’re going to fly down to Alameda and go aboard.”

The War Department acquired 318.2 acres (128.8 ha) by a lease (numbers W 868-ENG-2344 and W2972-ENG-1045) with Glenn County, California, in 1942. The site was used as an auxiliary airfield for Chico Army Airfield. The only improvement to the site was the asphalt runway. The Fourth Air Force declared the field excess to its needs on July 24, 1944. The lease was terminated June 11, 1945.

MENDOCINO AIR TANKER SQUAD

In 1956, through the efforts of Forest Service Officer Joseph Bolles Ely, the Willows Airport became the base of operations for the Mendocino Air Tanker Squad (MATS), the first squadron of air tankers in the U.S. Local agricultural pilots made up the initial squadron which assisted on fires throughout California during 1956. Willows Airport became the de facto center of aerial firefighting. In 1980, Carl Wilson, assistant director of the Pacific Southwest Forest and Range Experimentation Station in Riverside, wrote, "In October 1956, after the spectacular success on 25 wildfires, a series of drop tests were conducted at the Willows Airport. The primary objective was to determine the best height and air speed for the Stearmans and N3Ns (Air Force and Navy planes, respectively) to fly to obtain optimum patterns of water and sodium calcium borate on a geometric grid on the surface of the airport. Also, it was necessary to determine the effect of wind and other meteorological variables on drop patterns. As was the case in most other air attack studies, this was an interagency operation involving the California Division of Forestry (CalFire), Los Angeles County Fire Department, U. S. Forest Service (R-5), Equipment Development Center at Arcadia, Forest Service Experiment Station, and private industry."

The success of the squad in 1956 led to adding additional pilots in 1957 and then the California Division of Forestry (CalFire) to contract their own squad although many pilots flew for both agencies. Larger aircraft, mostly World War 2 surplus bombers, were added to the fleet.

The U.S. Forest Service continued to base their regional operations at Willows Airport until 1982. Larger aircraft required a longer runway, so operations were moved to Chico Municipal Airport (Butte County).

== National Register of Historic Places ==
On October 6, 2023 the airport was listed on the National Register of Historic Places.

== Facilities and aircraft ==
Willows-Glenn County Airport covers an area of 320 acres (129 ha) at an elevation of 141 feet (43 m) above mean sea level. It has two asphalt paved runways: 16/34 is 4,125 by 100 feet (1,257 x 30 m) and 13/31 is 3,788 by 60 feet (1,155 x 18 m).

For the 12-month period ending December 31, 2021, the airport had 29,500 general aviation aircraft operations, an average of 81 per day. At that time there were 39 aircraft based at this airport: 36 single-engine, 1 multi-engine, 1 jet, and 1 helicopter.

== See also ==
- California World War II Army Airfields
