= Joseph Bolles Ely =

Fire Control Officer

- Born: Joseph Bolles Ely; May 22, 1911; Chicago, Illinois, U.S.
- Died: March 20, 2006 (aged 94); Chico, California, U.S.
- Occupation: Forest Service Officer
- Spouse: Katherine Tisdale
- Children: 4

Joseph Bolles Ely (1911–2006) was a Fire Control Officer for the Mendocino National Forest who created the Mendocino Air Tanker Squad, the first such unit in the United States.

== Early life and education ==
Joseph B. Ely, the son of a banker, was born on May 22, 1911, in Chicago, Illinois. Growing up on Pewaukee Lake in Wisconsin, Ely was an avid outdoorsman. He was fascinated by stories his aunt told him about Montana.

Joe Ely and Katherine Tisdale were married on September 12, 1936

== Career ==
=== 1930s and 1940s ===
Upon joining the Forest Service in 1935, Ely spent three years at a tree nursery in Keosauqua, Iowa. Ely directed men from the Civilian Conservation Corps is growing trees for the plan by the federal government to buy and reforest submarginal land in southern Iowa to create the Hawkeye National Forest. That plan never came to fruition. Ely transferred to the tree nursery at the Lassen National Forest Headquarters in Susanville, California in 1938. In 1943 he became a District Ranger in the Foresthill District of the Tahoe National Forest. Ely was exempt from military service during the World War II as forest rangers were critical to protecting the forests from foreign attacks by fire.

=== 1950s ===
On July 9, 1953, 24 men were in a canyon 28 miles (45 km) northwest of Willows, in the Alder Springs area of the Mendocino National Forest, fighting the Rattlesnake Fire. At 10:00 PM they went down the canyon to put out a spot fire. Thinking it was out, they sat down to eat and to give thanks. The wind suddenly reappeared, coming from the opposite direction, causing a rapid flare-up in the thick chaparral brush. Nine of the men used a rope to ascend the steep canyon, while the others ran down the slope. The flames raced down the canyon at 15 miles per hour (24 km/h) overtaking, and killing, the trapped men. Many of the bodies were found next to shallow trenches the men tried to dig in the rocky ground. One of the dead was Robert Powers, a Forest Service Ranger. The other fourteen men, most in their 20s, were missionaries from a nearby training camp of the evangelical New Tribes Mission.

Dropping water from airplanes was thought of in the 1920s but no methods were tried. After World War II, the Forest Service and the military tried dropping barrels of water from a bomber. The barrels broke upon impact, but it was decided that a falling barrel endangered people on the ground. Another method was a rubber water-filled bladder loaded in a Grumman TBM Avenger. None of the methods worked.

== Death ==
Joseph Ely died in Chico, California on March 3, 2006.
