= Chronological Bible Storying =

Oral telling of stories in the Bible

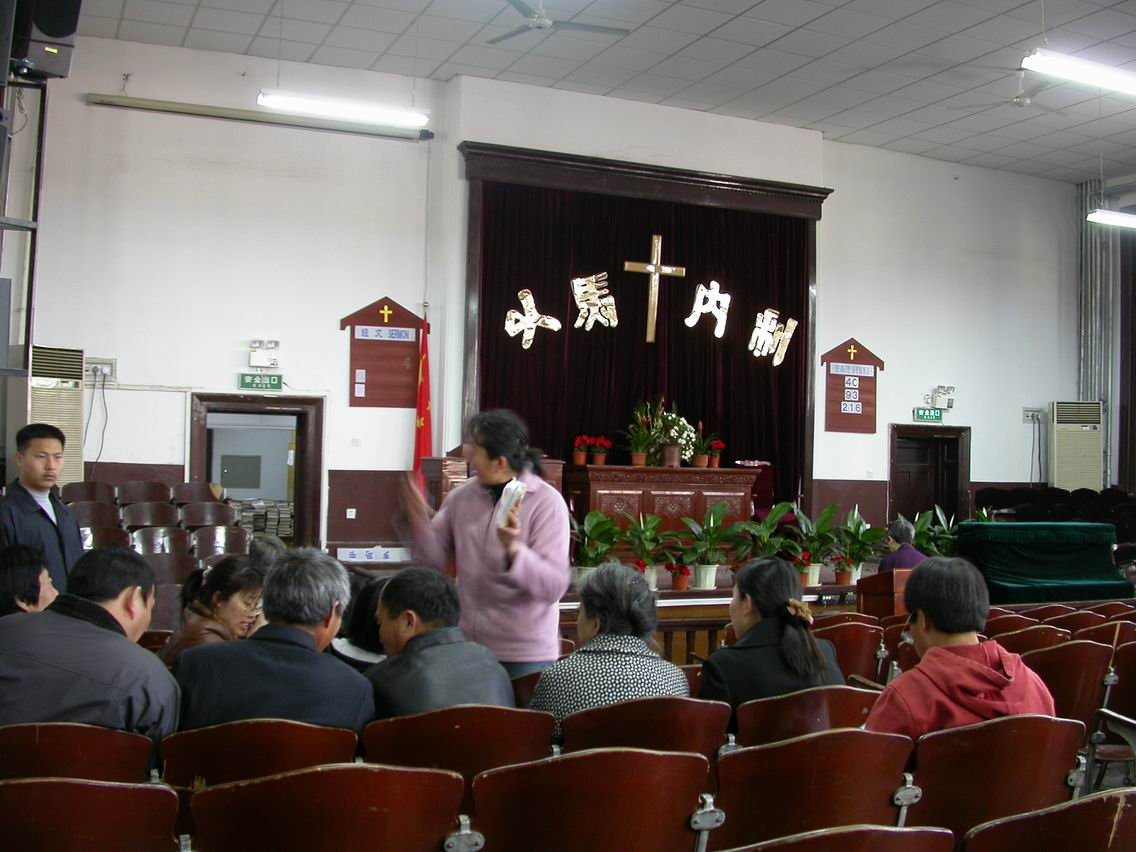
Oral Bible teaching

Chronological Bible Storying (CBS) is a method of orally communicating portions of the Bible by telling its stories aloud to listeners in chronological order. For people who are illiterate, or members of pre-literate societies, CBS presents the Bible as oral literature in a narrative format in an attempt to make it easier to understand and remember.

== Overview ==
The CBS stories are presented in what is regarded as Biblical chronological order in an attempt to allow the listener to connect the stories together to form one frame of reference regarding the Bible rather than just a series of unrelated stories.

CBS has its roots in Chronological Bible Teaching (CBT), which involves telling Biblical stories intermixed with teaching about the themes, significance, and message of the story. This form was popularized by Trevor McIlwain and used extensively by New Tribes Mission since the 1970s. McIlwain's influence on John R. Cross led him to write "The Stranger on the Road to Emmaus", which presented the Bible in a chronological format. CBT proponentes argue that the Bible and biblical theology is best understood when one studies the content beginning in Genesis, studying stories, events, and themes in the order and context in which they took place. CBT is closely related to Biblical Theology, and is often encouraged as an alternative, or complement to Systematic Theology.

CBS is unlike CBT in that it explicitly avoids mixing the stories with teaching. Instead, CBS seeks to present Biblical stories as directly as from scripture as possible with minimal explanation. Theological truths are better understood in oral cultures within the concrete example of a story rather than abstract principles present in literate teaching styles.

CBS attempts to present a comprehensive overview of the Bible that provides the necessary background pre-literate people with no previous exposure to the Christianity need to understand Jesus Christ and the gospel. CBS is often used for evangelization, discipleship, and church planting as a way to establish an organized church within illiterate cultures, generally with the long-term goal of promoting literacy and translating the Bible into a language the group can be taught to read.
