= Aviation industry of Russia =

Russia's aviation industry is a significant industrial sector of the country, employing from 355,000 to 400,000 people.

The Russian aviation industry is largely state-owned and centrally controlled, with little strategic private competition. As of 2025, the majority of both military and civil production is held by three large joint stock corporations under the State Corporation "Rostec" conglomerate. United Aircraft Corporation engages in the production of both military and civil aircraft, Russian Helicopters with a variety of helicopters, and United Engine Corporation producing aircraft, marine and industrial engines.

The Russian and Soviet aerospace industry has made many important contributions to the history of aircraft. Achievements include the second operational jetliner in service (Tupolev Tu-104) (the only jetliner from 1956 to 1958 when the British de Havilland Comet was grounded), the world's first commercial supersonic transport aircraft (Tupolev Tu-144), the largest spacecraft to remotely orbit and land (Buran), world's largest aircraft (Antonov An-225) the fastest manned serially produced aircraft in operational use, and offered for civilian flights (Mikoyan-Gurevich MiG-25), the first use of 3 dimensional thrust vectoring on a combat aircraft (Sukhoi Su-37), the world's most-produced helicopter (Mil Mi-8/Mil Mi-17), the world's largest operational helicopter (Mil Mi-26) and the first operation combat helicopter equipped with a crew ejection system (Kamov Ka-50).

The Russian aviation industry underwent an unprecedented collapse following the breakup of the Soviet Union. Once a world leader in aircraft design and production, the industry experienced a near-total contraction in the Yeltsin era as a result of fragmented supply chains, loss of centralised funding and loss of export markets, resulting in a contraction of the workforce and emigration of engineers. Well recognised former state design bureaus such as Tupolev and Ilyushin faced bankruptcy, and the production of aircraft was effectively halted. This situation was made worse by the 1998 Russian financial crisis.

In 2006, the Russian government forced the United Aircraft Corporation, merging the remaining assets of various companies under the majority stake of the government. A similar venture, Russian Helicopters, consolidated helicopter production. Contracts signed with partners such as India and China provided critical cash flow. As a result, the production of military aircraft began to recover, with large scale production of several existing and new models such as the Su-34, Su-35, Su-57 and Yak-130 underway.

The current goal of the Russian aerospace industry is to revive large scale civil passenger aircraft manufacturing. Due to the challenges posed by international sanctions, offerings such as the Ilyushin Il-114, Yakovlev SJ-100 and Yakovlev MC-21 focus on self-sufficiency and import substitution.

== History ==
=== First World War ===
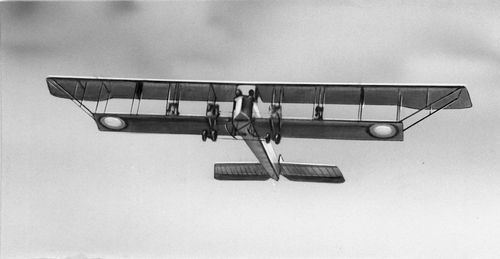
Sikorsky Ilya Muromets in flight

Russia had 24 aircraft manufacturers at the outbreak of war, but they did not have the materials or the capacity to replace the aircraft that were lost. In particular, they were dependent on foreign engines. It produced 1893 aircraft and imported 883 from 1914 to 1916, but it only produced 920 engines in this period while importing 2326. Production declined sharply after the February Revolution, and had virtually ceased when Russia left the war in 1918. The most famous aircraft produced during this period was the Sikorsky Ilya Muromets, the first four-engine bomber to equip a dedicated strategic bombing unit. This heavy bomber was unrivalled in the early stages of the war, as the Central Powers had no comparable aircraft until much later. During World War I, Russia lost only one Sikorsky Ilya Muromets to enemy action in more than 400 sorties.

=== 1922-1991 Soviet era: East giant ===
In the Soviet planned economic system, free market competition between companies was seen as wasteful. The Soviet system was instead multi-tiered, the chief components of which were design bureaus, known as OKBs, and manufacturing complexes.

The OKBs did not possess the means to mass-produce manufactured aircraft and the manufacturing complexes were unable to design aircraft.

Operational requirements for proposed aircraft were created by the Soviet Air Forces, for which individual OKBs would create a design informed by state research institutes. The state research institutes would then provide the OKSs with information on aerodynamics and available systems. This process led to competing designs being very similar in appearance. These competing designs would be evaluated against each other the winning design would be handed off to the manufacturing complexes for production. Most of these complexes were within the Soviet Union, but some production lines were assigned to allies within the Warsaw Pact. Due in part to political considerations, the assignment of production was widely dispersed, creating supply chains in which the role of state planning was paramount.

When exported, a third tier existed in the state-run export companies due to neither design bureaus nor manufacturing companies being responsible for the marketing of their products overseas. The state-run export companies did not benefit from the sale of their products, with proceeds instead being allocated to design and production units in order to meet centrally determined production targets.

With the dissolution of the Soviet Union, Warsaw Pact and Comecon there came a disconnect between end users, export companies, OKBs, assembly plants, and component manufacturers (some of which now existed in newly independent and sometimes hostile nations). Russia also found that entire segments of its aviation requirements now lay in foreign countries. One example of this was the manufacture of jet training aircraft, which was assigned to Czechoslovakia, while Poland got light helicopters and crop-dusting airplanes. Additionally, Romania possessed the manufacture of light helicopters, the majority of Russia's tactical airlift design capability in the form of the Antonov was now in Ukraine, and the main assembly plant for the Sukhoi Su-25 ground attack aircraft was in Georgia.

=== 1992-2005 Post-Soviet adjustments: Competition and struggles ===
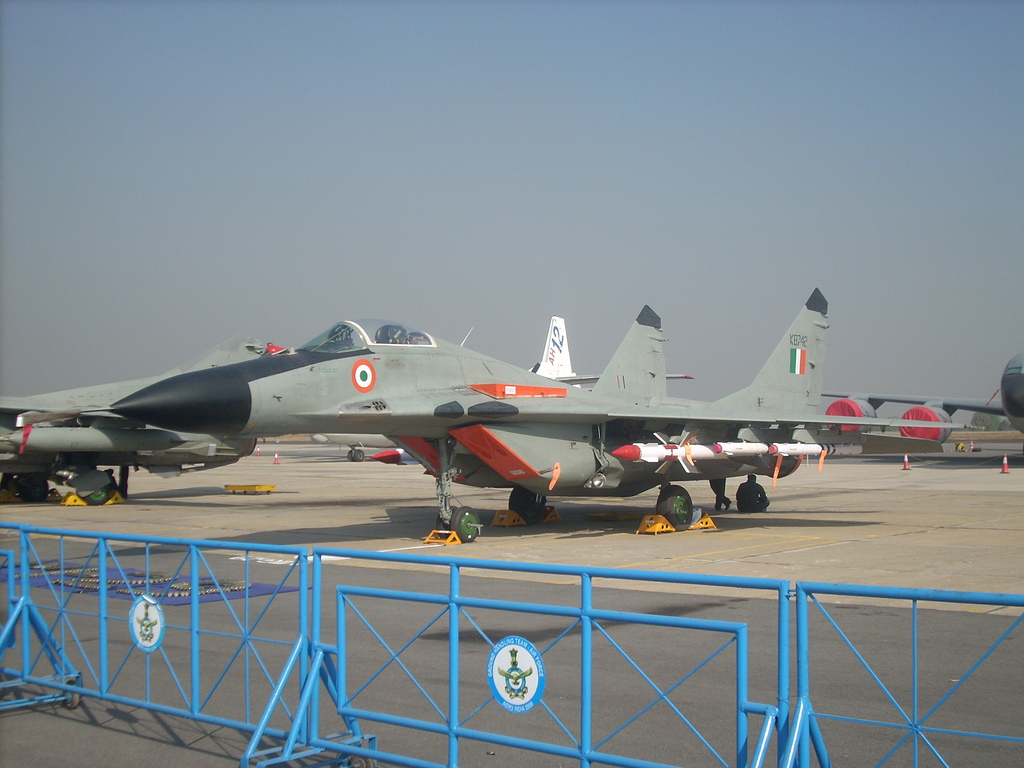
Indian Air Force MiG-29. MiG-29 fighters were one of the industry's key exports during the crisis years in 1990s

Aerospace was a well-developed industry in the Soviet Union. In late 1980s, the Soviet Union accounted for 25% of the worldwide civilian and 40% of the worldwide military aircraft production. The consequences of the Soviet Union's dissolution in 1991 were however catastrophic. The whole manufacturing sector was devastated by imports, while the aerospace and automobile industries barely managed to survive under highly protective tariffs. On the positive side, the military aircraft industry managed to benefit from improving export possibilities. It profited from a large stock of components and parts which had been produced during Soviet times. The civilian aircraft industry fared much worse: while in 1990, the country had produced 715 civilian aircraft, by 1998 the number had dropped to 56 and in 2000 only four civilian aircraft were produced.

As the industry structure was deeply fractionalised, the consensus was that consolidation was necessary. For this purpose, President Boris Yeltsin created the VPK-MAPO (Military Industrial Complex – Moscow Aircraft Production Association), which included some key companies such as Mikoyan. MAPO later became the Russian Aircraft Company (RAC) 'MiG'. This stage of consolidation was however not very successful, and MAPO was later merged with Sukhoi.

The aerospace industry's total output in 2000 was $2.7 billion, with a net profit of $600 million. Exports of military aircraft in 2000 amounted to $1.3 billion.

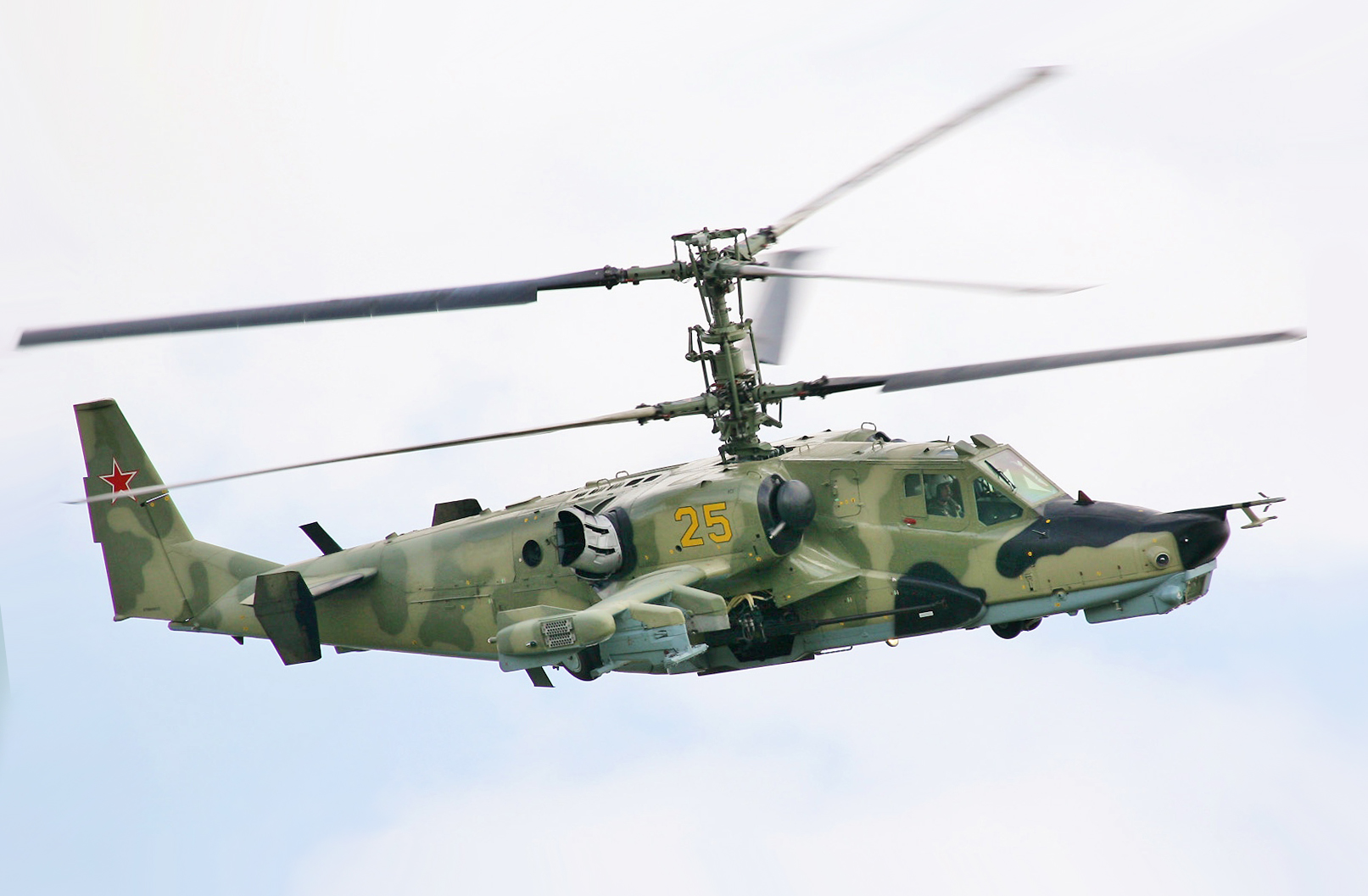
Russian Air Force Kamov Ka-50

The civilian aircraft industry was affected by the 1998 Russian financial crisis. Only a few aircraft were built and after-sale maintenance was minuscule. Many planes, both new and old, failed to receive international safety and environmental certifications. Two key companies, Aviastar-SP and Voronezh Aircraft Production Association were almost bankrupt. The profits of the civilian aircraft industry totaled just $300 million in 2001. However, in August 2000, the situation started improving considerably. In 2001, the industry finally started receiving new orders from leasing companies. Air transportation grew about 8% a year, and by 2004 domestic demand for new aircraft was soaring. Key companies managed to pay their debts or get them restructured, and production levels were increasing again.

The military aircraft industry survived the 15 years of crisis almost exclusively through exports. Only in 2005 did the industry start to receive substantial financing from the state budget.

=== 2006-2022: Industry consolidation programme and New projects ===
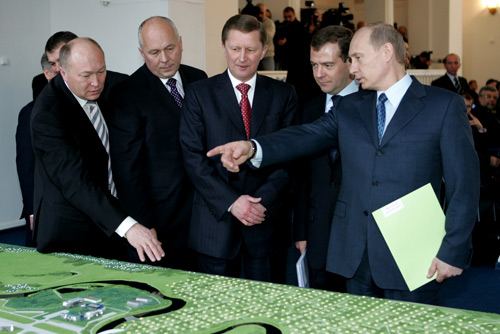
President of OAO United Aircraft Corporation (UAC) Alexei Feodorov (left) with Sergei Ivanov, President Dmitry Medvedev and Prime Minister Vladimir Putin (right) in 2008.

In 2005, the government under President Vladimir Putin initiated an industry consolidation programme to bring the main aircraft producing companies under a single umbrella organization, the United Aircraft Corporation (UAC). The aim was optimize production lines and minimise losses. The programme was divided in three parts: reorganization and crisis management (2007–2010), evolution of existing projects (2010–2015) and further progress within the newly created structure (2015–2025).

The UAC, one of the so-called national champions and comparable to EADS in Europe, enjoyed considerable financial support from the Russian government, and injected money to the companies it had acquired to improve their financial standing. The UACs first budget in 2007, was about 2 billion rubles, and next year it increased to 24 billion rubles (about $770 million).

The deliveries of civilian aircraft increased to 6 in 2005, and in 2009 the industry delivered 15 civilian aircraft, worth 12.5 billion roubles, mostly to domestic customers.

Despite the 2008 financial crisis, Russia's aircraft manufacturing industry as a whole increased production and sales by 19.5% in 2009.

==== Fifth-generation fighter ====
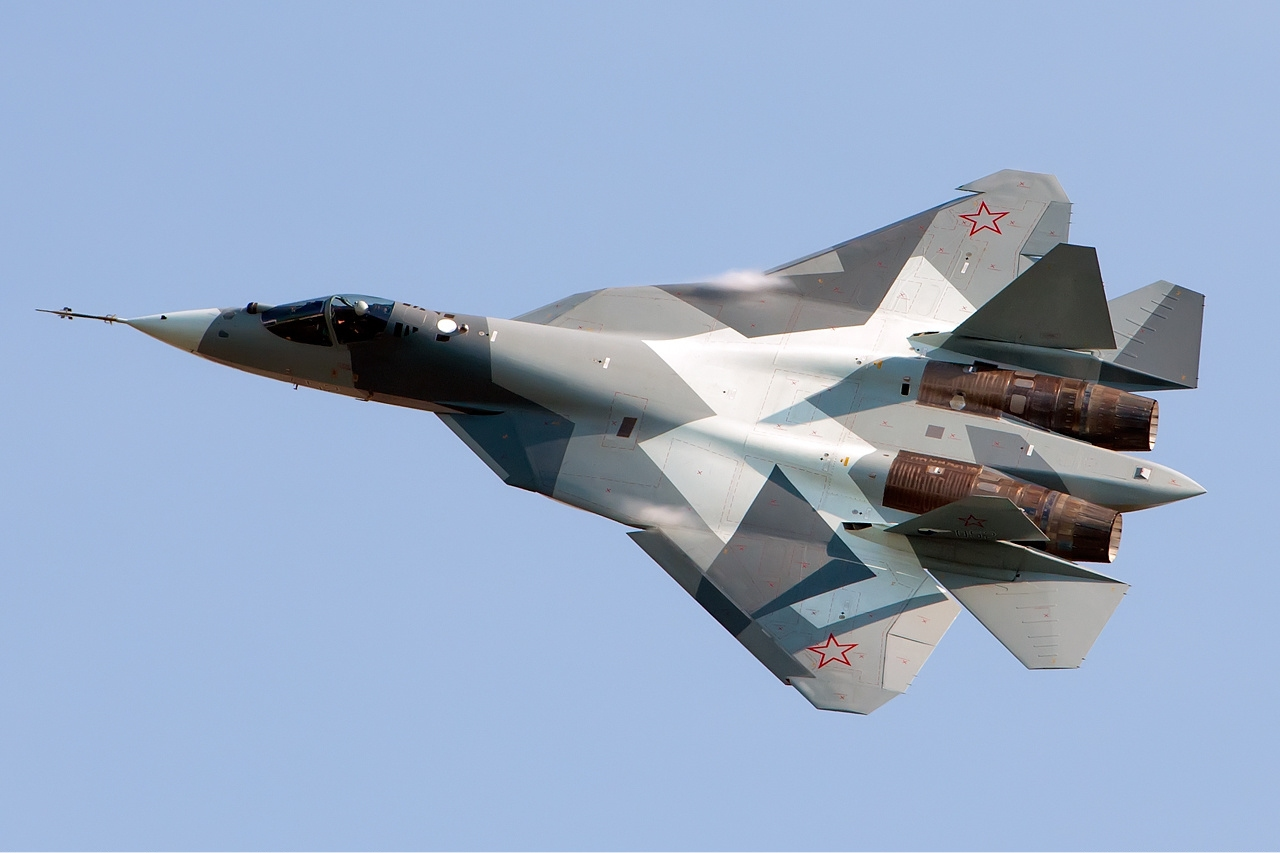
Sukhoi Su-57 prototype

In 1998, the Russian Air Force asked the industry to develop a light multirole frontline aircraft. In 2001, the requirements were upgraded to a multirole frontline aircraft system, which later became the fifth-generation fighter Sukhoi Su-57, regarded as Russia's response to the American Joint Strike Fighter. The Su-57 performed its maiden flight in 2010, breaking United States's complete monopoly on the development and production of fifth-generation jets. Moscow Defense Brief hailed it as a major coup for the Russian aerospace industry, writing that:

"while not America's equal militarily, Russia is still a solid second in terms of defense technology, outranking both Western Europe and China and punching well above its economic weight."

Russian prime minister Vladimir Putin announced that government would increase financing of Russian defence industry complex.

Su-57 development could be delayed due to international sanctions on Russia's defence industries following the 2022 Russian invasion of Ukraine, and Russia could not import semiconductors and high-tech machining equipment from the European Union.

==== Sukhoi Superjet 100 ====
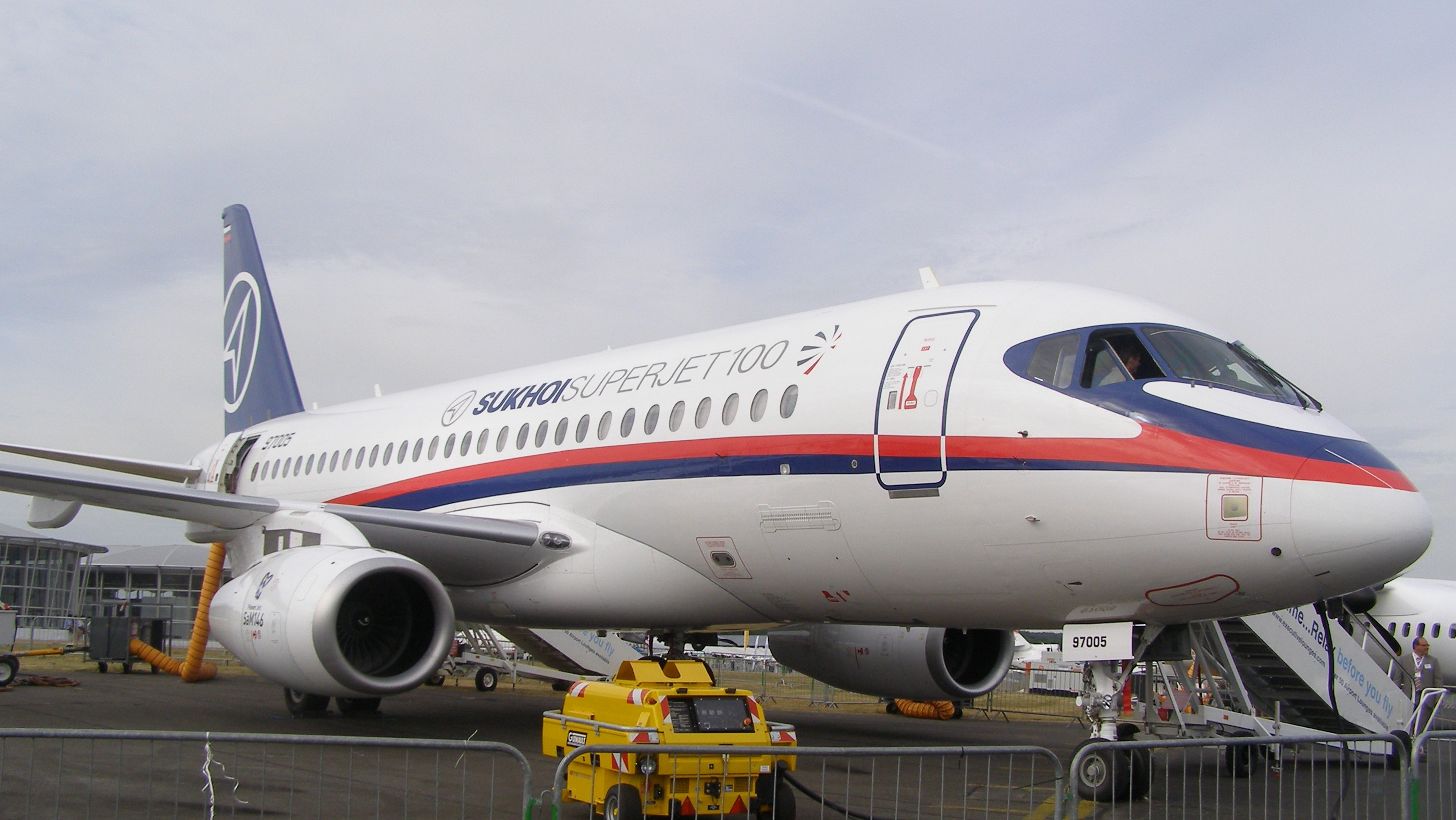
Sukhoi Superjet 100 at the 2010 Farnborough Air Show

The Sukhoi Superjet 100 regional airliner is the first major Russian civilian aircraft whose development was started after 1991. The plane, which first flew in 2008, was described in 2009 as the most important and successful civil aircraft program of the Russian aerospace industry. Designed by the United Aircraft Corporation subsidiary Sukhoi in cooperation with foreign partners, all versions of the plane are assembled by Komsomolsk-on-Amur Aircraft Production Association (KnAAPO) in the Russian Far East, while Novosibirsk Aircraft Production Association (NAPO) focuses on component production. The two companies have been heavily investing in upgrading of their facilities, and were expected to produce 70 airframes by 2012. Sukhoi delivered only three SSJs in the first half of 2019; its financial results showed a sevenfold drop in aircraft sales revenue and a fourfold drop in overall sales revenue, resulting in a 32% increase in its net loss. The company needs to achieve a production rate of 32 to 34 aircraft per year to make a profit, though demand for Russian models in the 60–120 seat category was forecast to be only 10 aircraft per year over a 20-year period. In the short-term, the company's main hope was that Aeroflot would firm up its 2018 preliminary agreement for 100 SSJs.

==== Yakovlev MC-21 ====
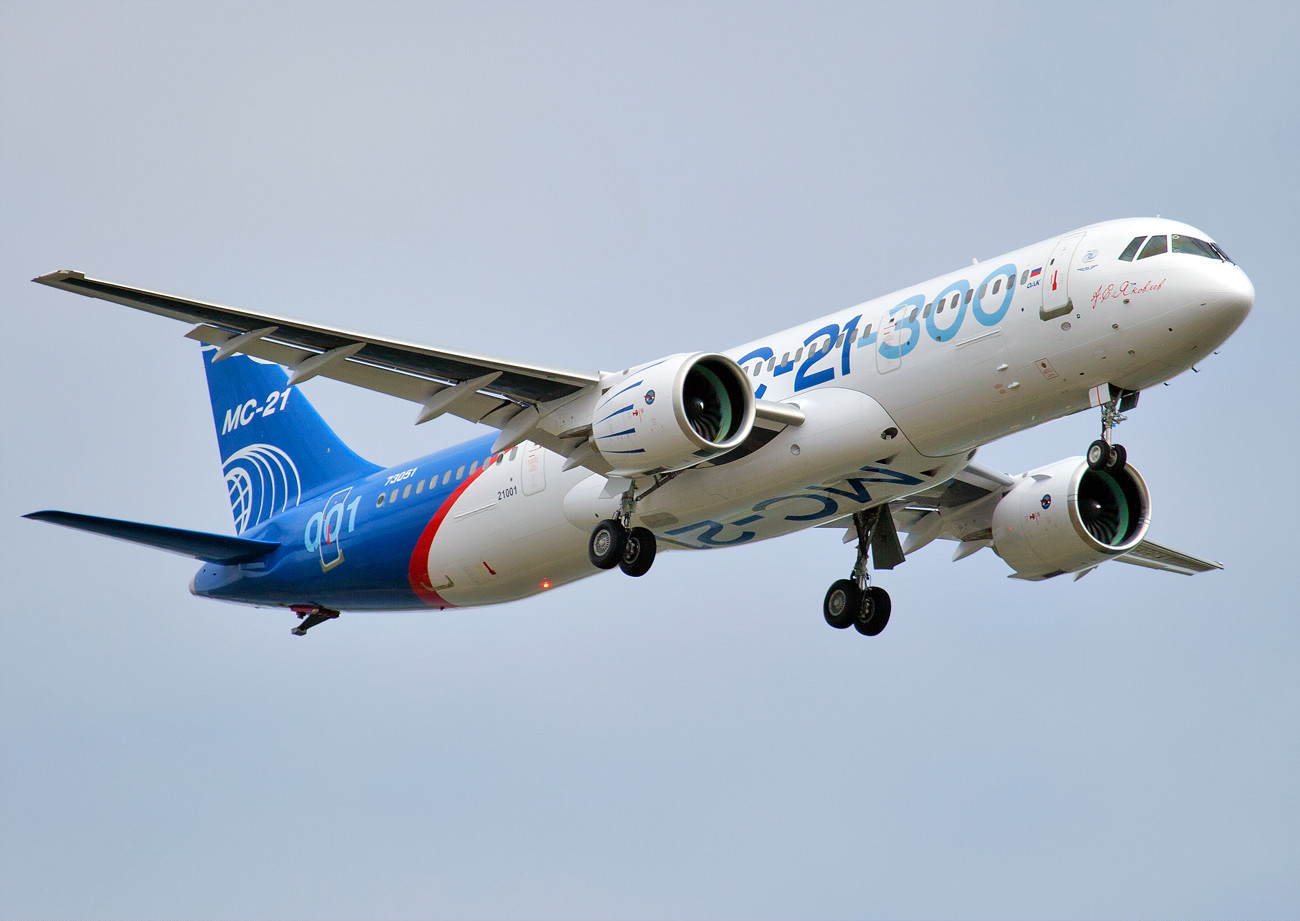
The MC-21-300 during its maiden flight in Irkutsk (05.28.2017)

Development of the Yakovlev MC-21 passenger aircraft was begun in the early 2000s. The aircraft, which will have a passenger capacity of 150–200 and a range of 5,000 km, is being designed by Yakovlev Corporation, initially in cooperation with foreign partners. It is targeted at the most popular segment of the domestic airline industry, and is intended to replace older planes such as the Tupolev Tu-154. The program is in the production phase. The MC-21 certification and delivery was initially planned by 2016, but delivery was delayed. The developers aim to sell 1,200–1,500 planes in total, amounting to a 12–15% share of the international market.

=== 2022-today: Impact and renovation ===
In 2022, after international sanctions against Russia were imposed, Rosaviatsia announced that in a resulting change of plans, Russia will only use a domestic engine. The original model – the MC-21-300 powered by Pratt & Whitney PW1000G engines – will not enter service, and instead production will have to wait for the MC-21-310, powered by the Russian Aviadvigatel PD-14, built by the United Engine Corporation. The MC-21-300 consists of between 40% and 50% imported parts, and Yakovlev will need to replace those that were to be supplied by the sanctioning countries.

==== Other projects ====
Other new aircraft developed in recent times include the Yak-130 advanced trainer and light attack jet, the modernized Tu-204SM and the Ukrainian An-148 regional aircraft, which was mostly manufactured in Voronezh prior to worsening Ukrainian-Russian relations. Seaplane manufacturer Beriev is also designing several new passenger aircraft. Tu-214 and the cargo Il-76 are expected to be capable of re-manufacturing massively in the 2020s.

== Structure ==
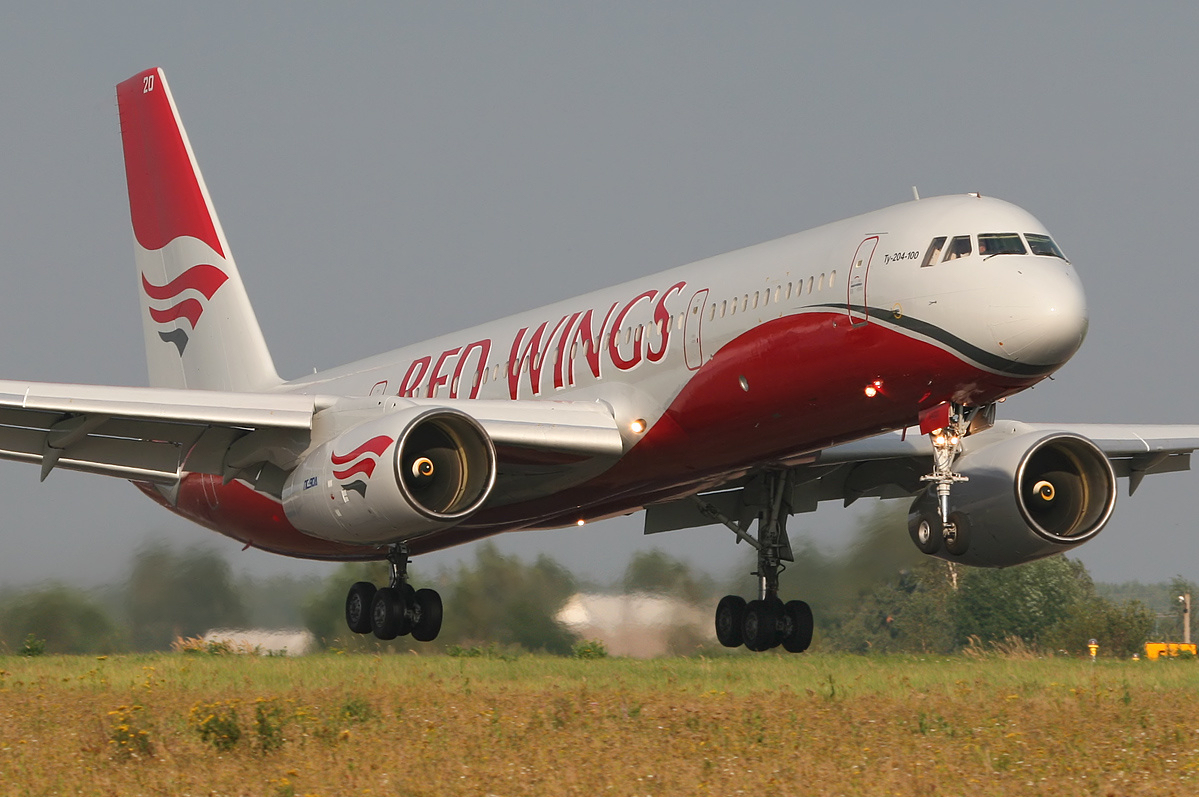
Red Wings Airlines Tupolev Tu-204-100. Tu-204 planes are manufactured by Aviastar-SP in Ulyanovsk

In 2008, the aircraft industry consisted of 106 enterprises, 18 of which belonged to the United Aircraft Corporation. One of the most successful companies is Sukhoi, which possesses a wide portfolio of internationally competitive military aircraft, including the Su-27, Su-30 and Su-35 models. On the civilian segment, the company's most important project is the Superjet 100. Komsomolsk-on-Amur Aircraft Production Association, Russia's largest aircraft enterprise, is responsible for manufacturing Sukhoi products. Joint Stock Company Tupolev focuses on the civil aviation market with its Tu-204 and Tu-214 planes, but is also responsible for the long-range bomber Tu-160 and for developing its successors. Mass production of Tu-204 planes is accomplished by Aviastar SP, located in Ulyanovsk, while the Tu-214 variant is produced by Kazan Aircraft Production Association. Ilyushin focuses on the military cargo and transport sector. Yakovlev has a portfolio of trainer and amphibious aircraft projects and competes in the onboard electronics and avionics niche. In the unmanned aerial vehicle segment, ZALA Aero and Vega Radio Engineering Corporation are among the leading companies.

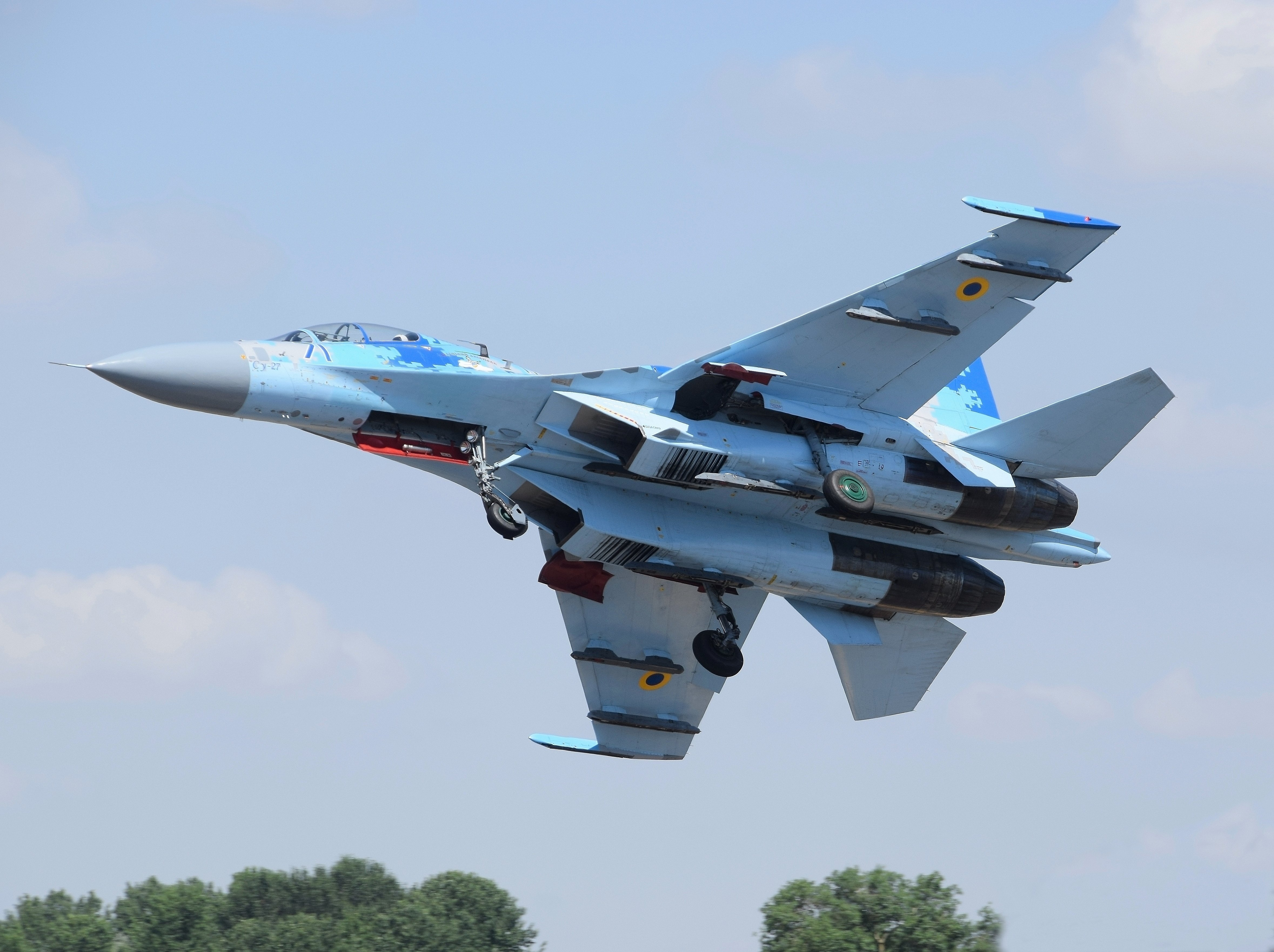
Sukhoi Su-27UB arrives at the 2018 RIAT, England

United Aircraft Corporation	Russian Helicopters JSC	Other major producers:
Beriev; Ilyushin; Voronezh Aircraft Production Association; Yakovlev Corporation; Irkutsk Aviation Plant; BETA AIR; IRKUT AviaSTEP Design Bureau; Russian Avionics Design Bureau; Mikoyan; Sokol Aircraft Plant; Sukhoi; Komsomolsk-on-Amur Aircraft Production Association; Novosibirsk Aircraft Production Association; Tupolev; Aviastar-SP; Kazan Aircraft Production Association; Lavochkin	Kamov; Kazan Helicopter Plant; Mil Helicopters; Rostvertol; Ulan-Ude Aviation Plant	Aviakor; Myasishchev; Technoavia; Ural Works of Civil Aviation

== Scientific institutions ==
- Central Aerohydrodynamic Institute
- Gromov Flight Research Institute
- Baranov Central Institute of Aviation Motor Development
- All-Russian Institute Of Aviation Materials
- State Scientific Research Institute of Aviation Systems

== Production ==
=== Commercial aircraft ===
Commercial aircraft in production

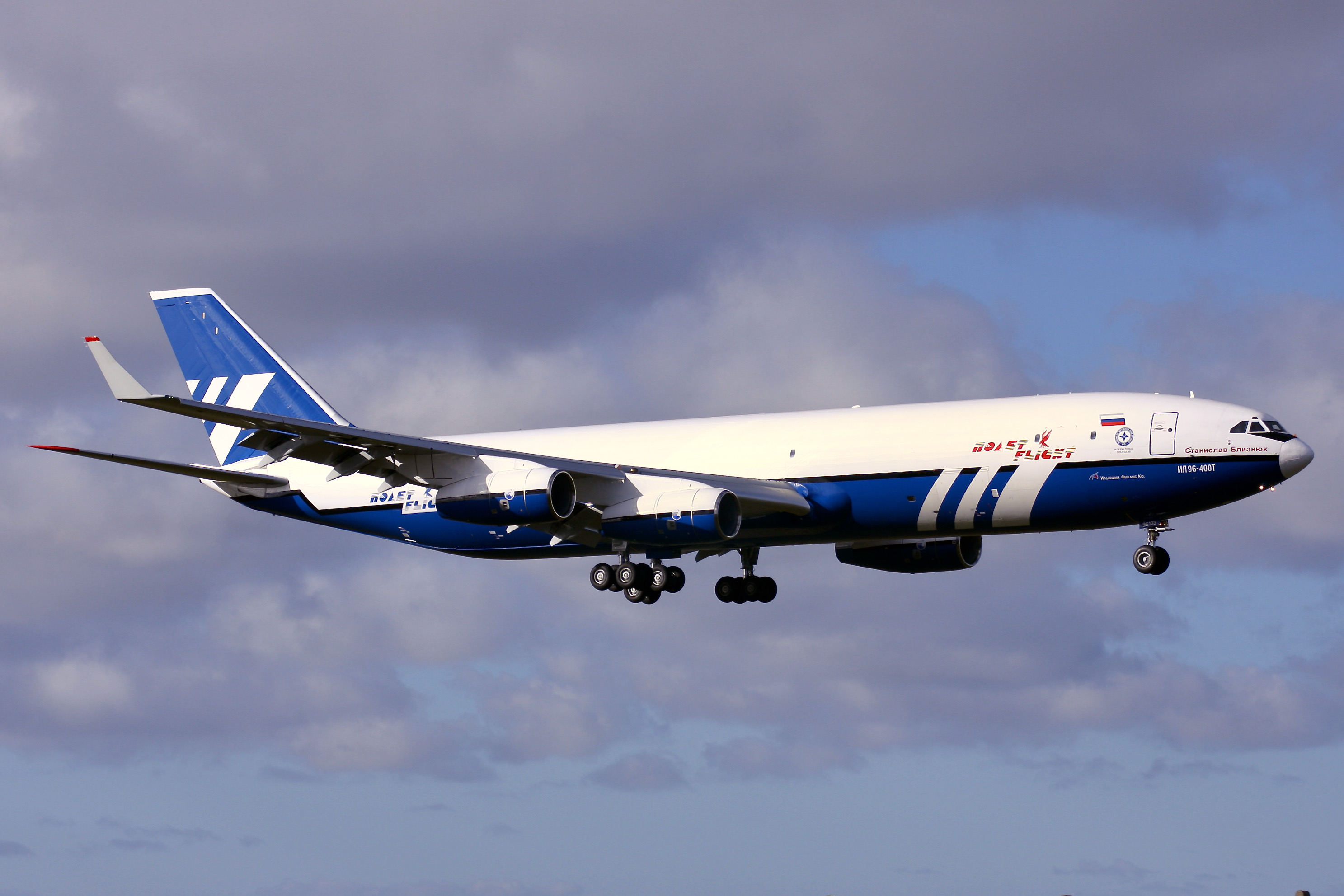
Ilyushin Il-96

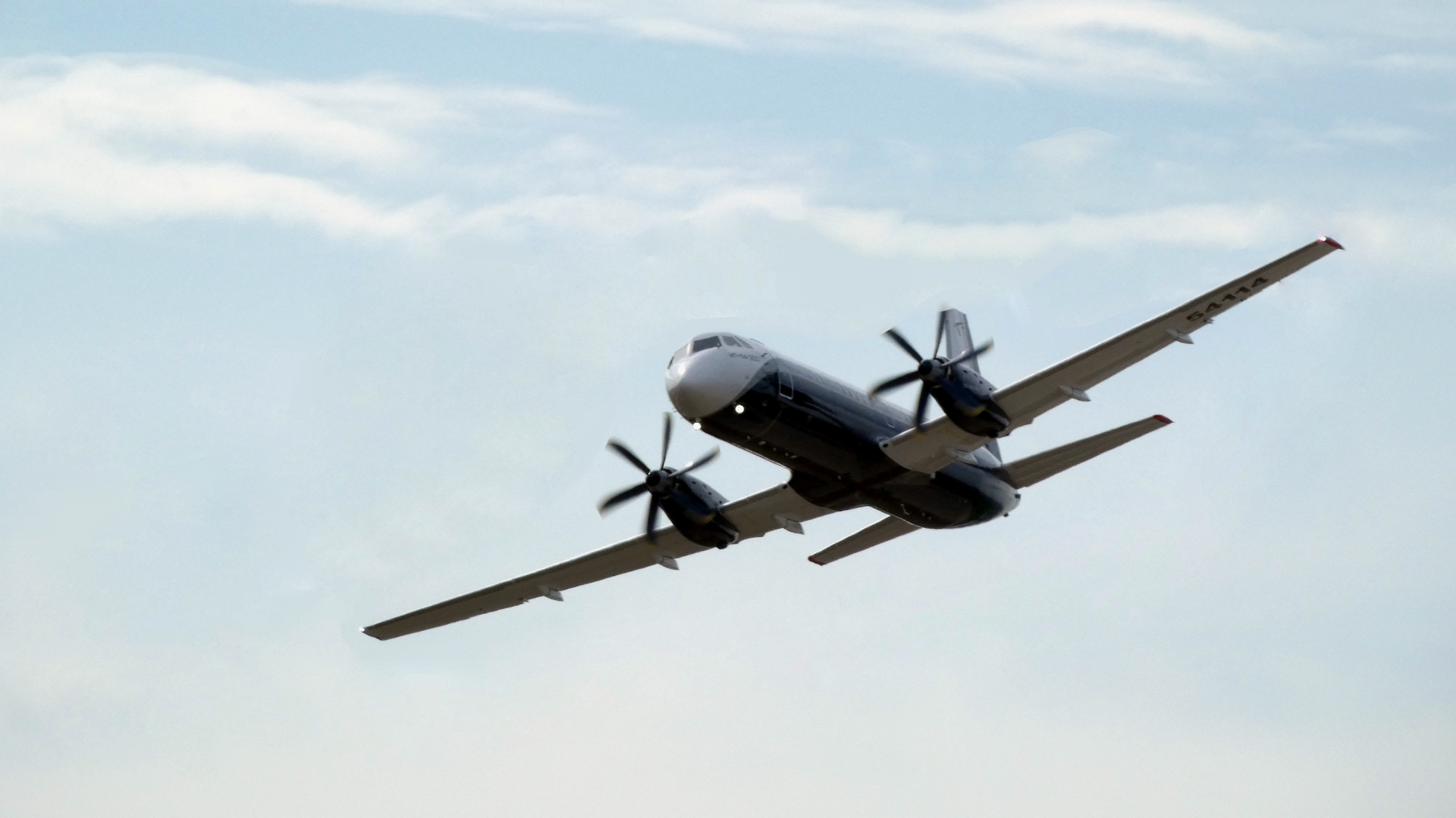
Ilyushin Il-114

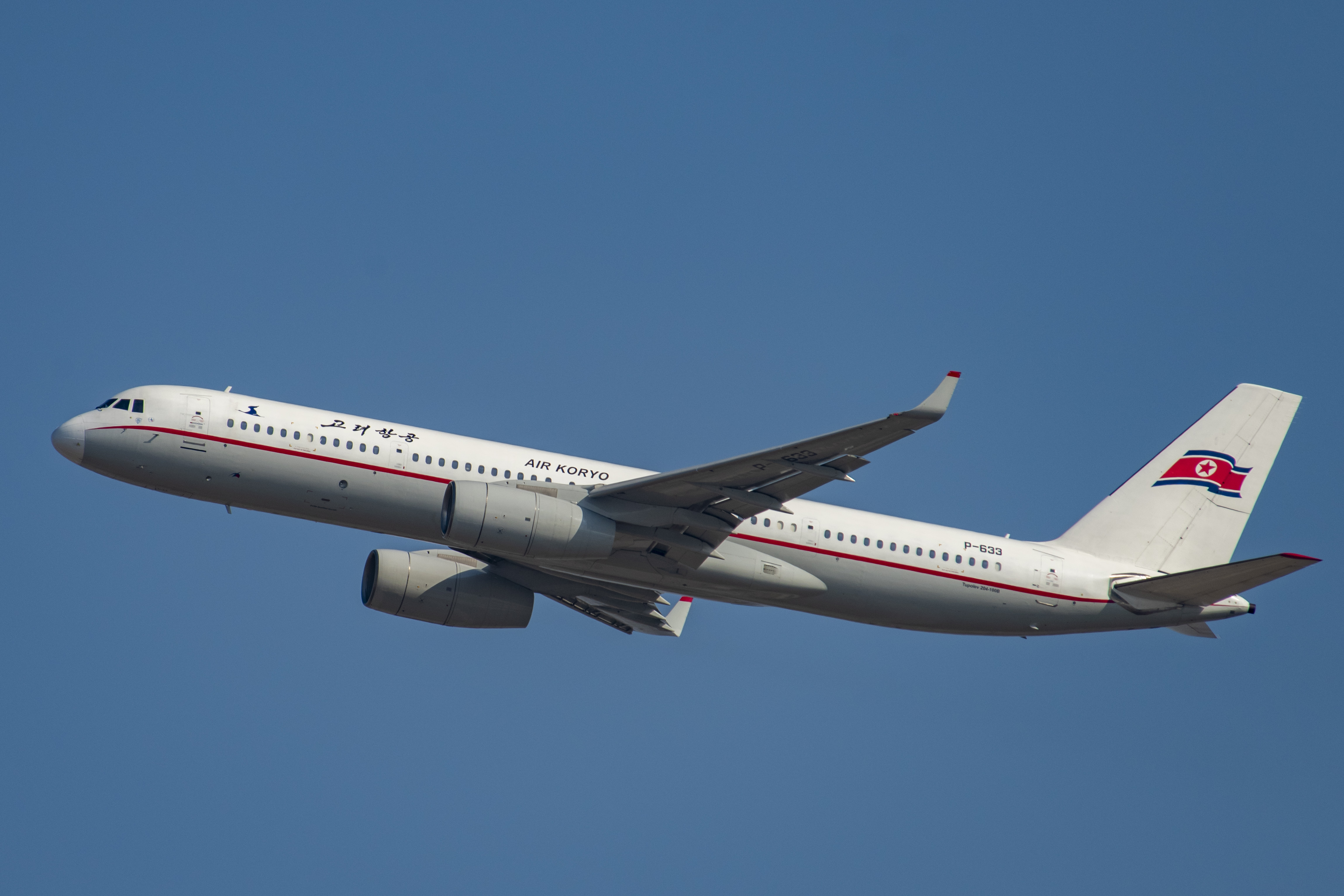
Tupolev Tu-204

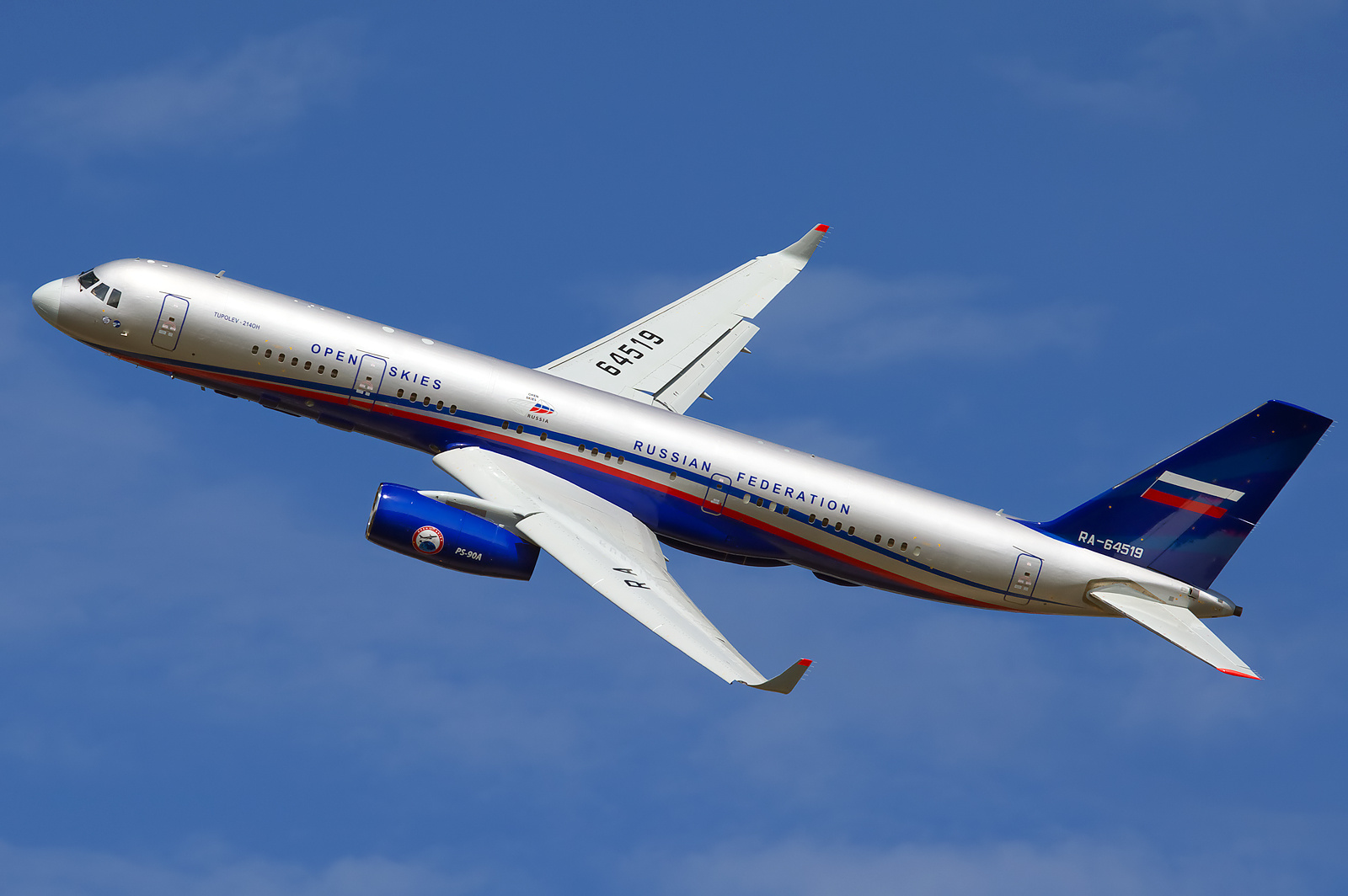
Tupolev Tu-214

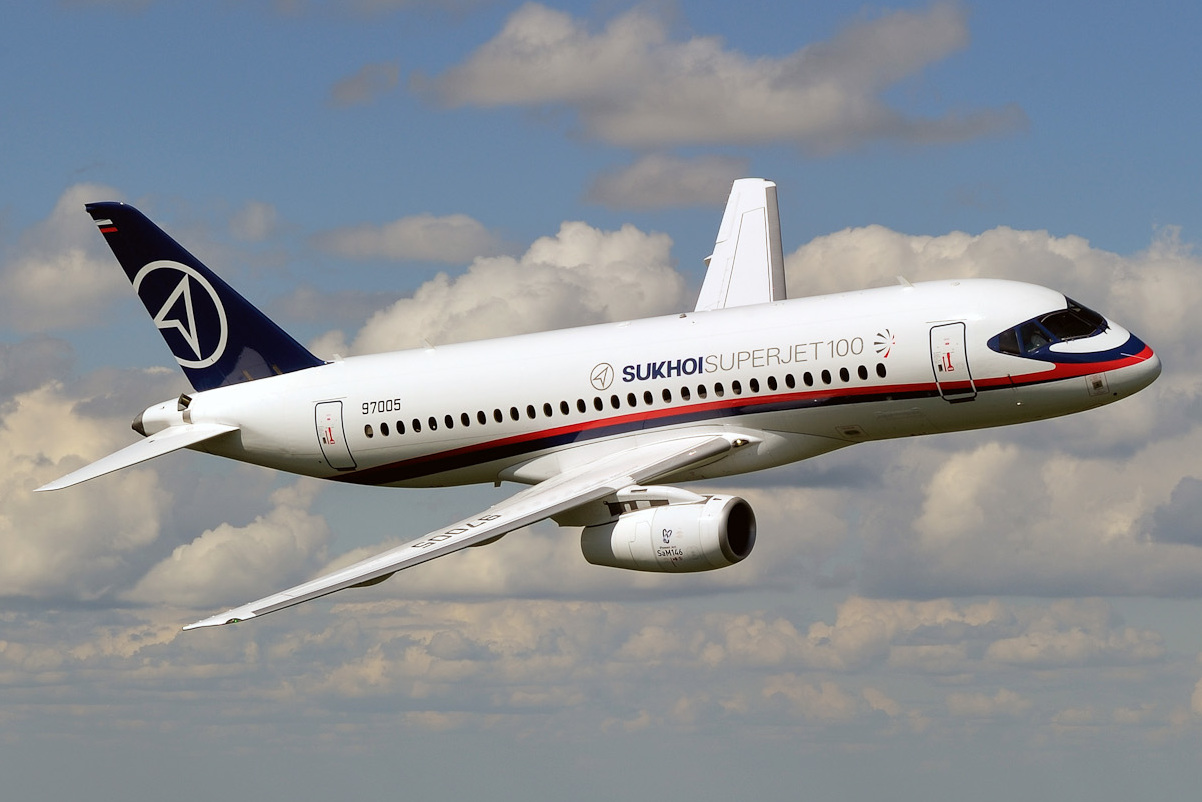
Yakovlev SJ-100

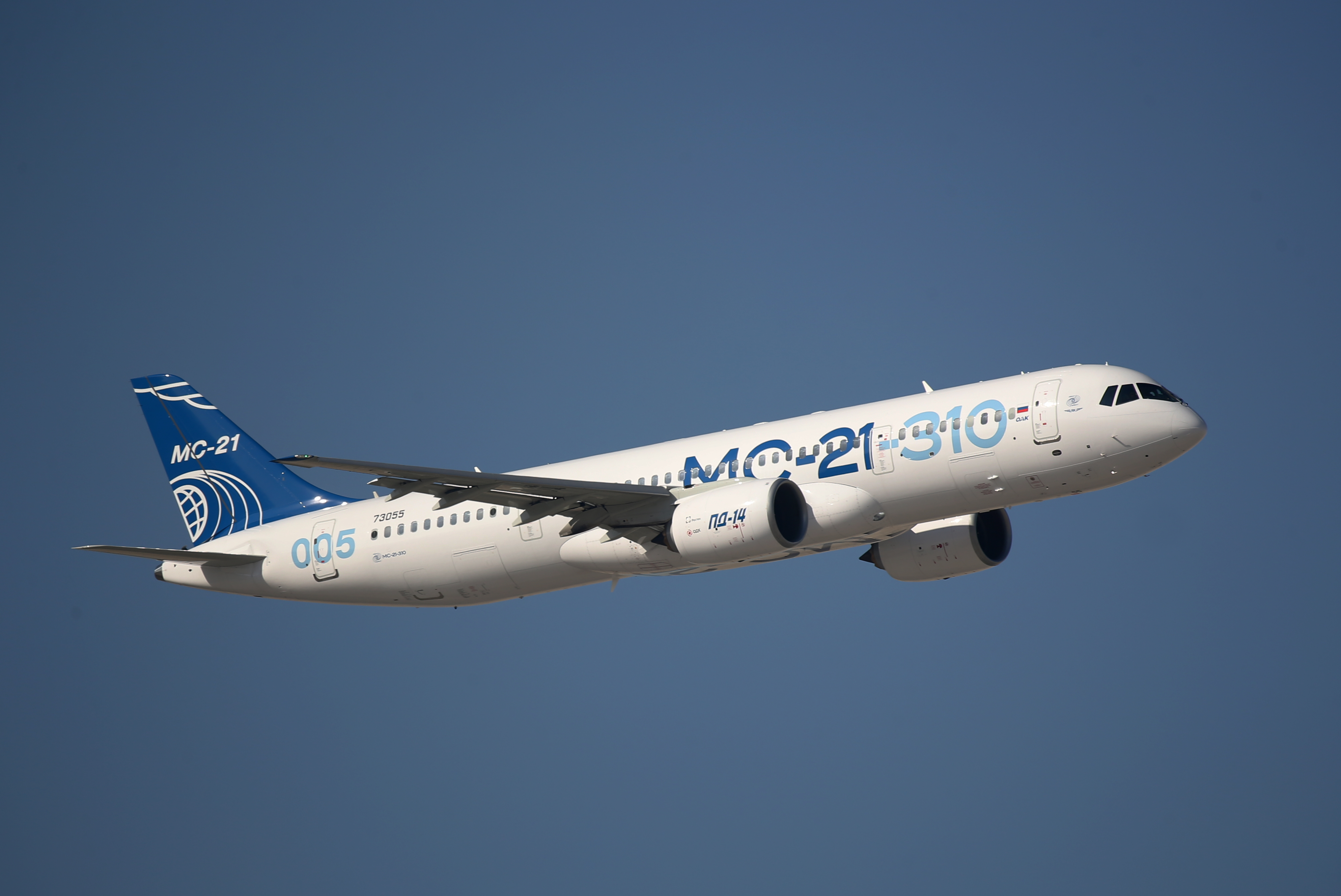
Yakovlev MC-21

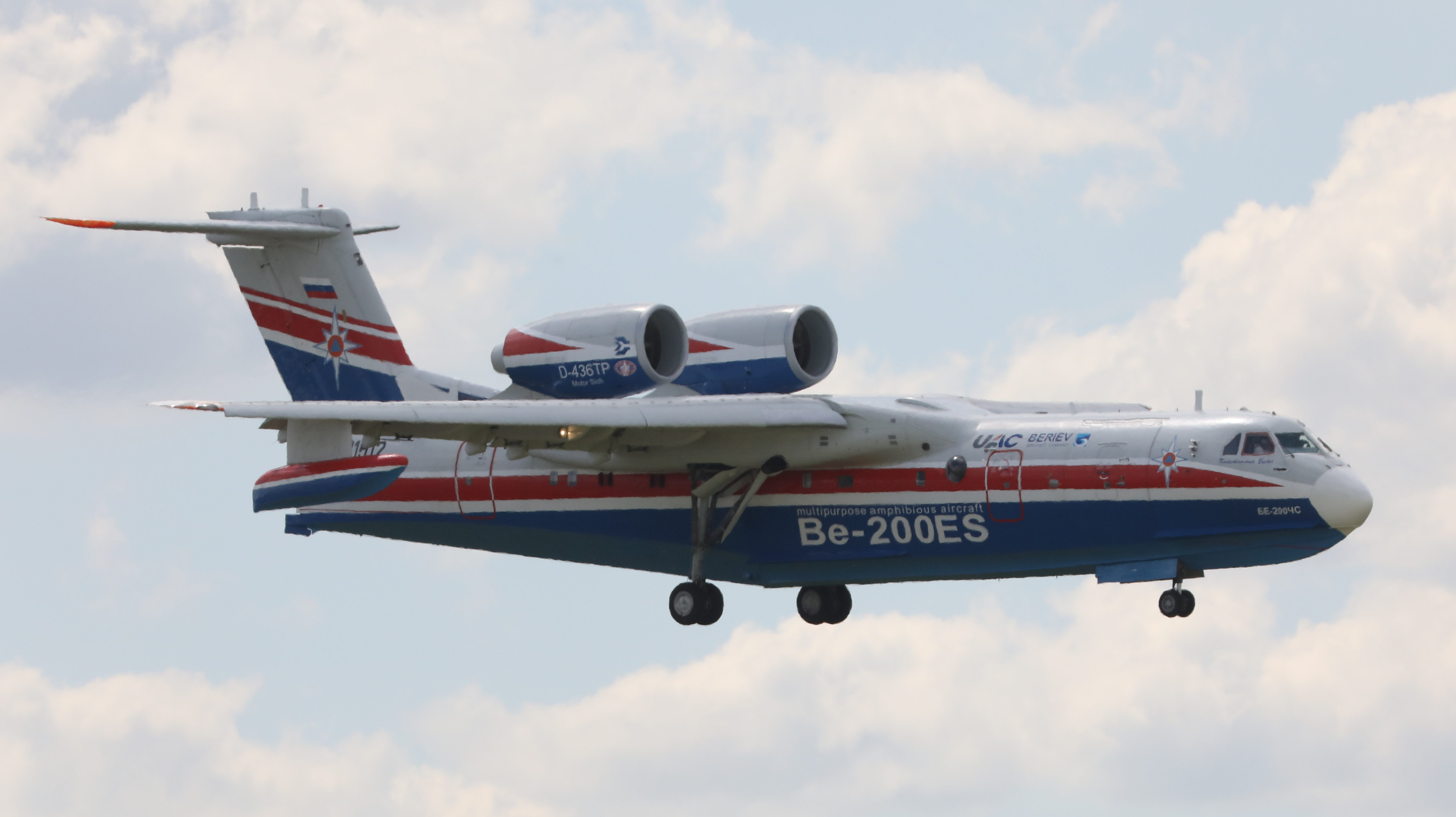
Beriev Be-200

Civilian fixed-wing aircraft deliveries by Russian companies 2005–2018
Type	2005	2006	2007	2008	2009	2010	2011	2012	2013	2014	2015	2016	2017	2018
Il-96 family	1	2	2	2	2		1	1	1	1	2	2	1	
Tu-154M	1	1	1			1		2	X	X	X	X	X	X
Tu-204 family	3	3	3	6	4	1	3	2				1	1	
Tu-214	1	2		1	2	2	3	1	2	1	2	1	2	3
Be-200						1	1							
SSJ-100					1	2	5	12	24	36	18	19	33	24
Il-76 family														
Total	6	8	6	9	9	7	13	18	27					

=== Military aircraft ===
Military aircraft in production

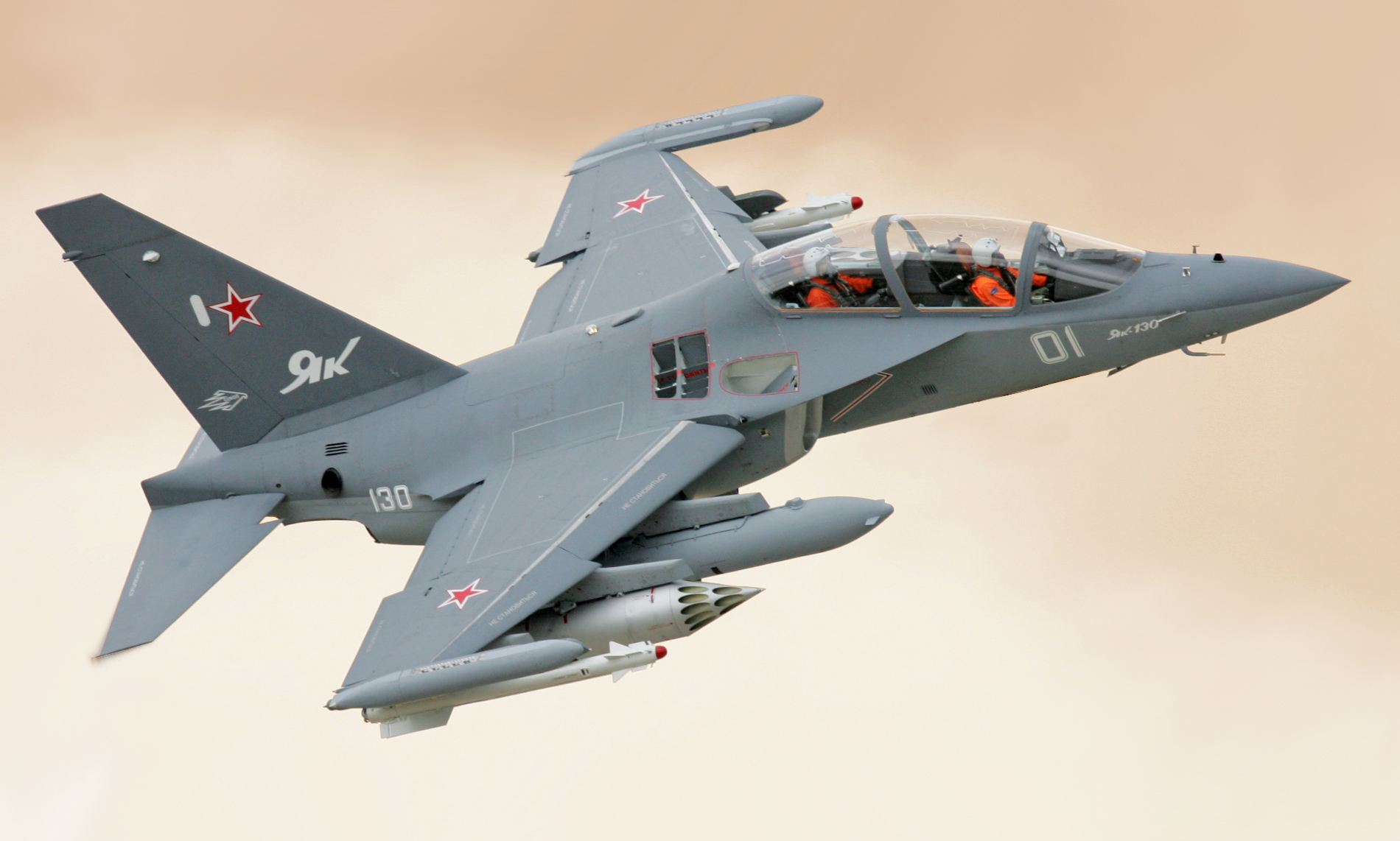
Yakovlev Yak-130

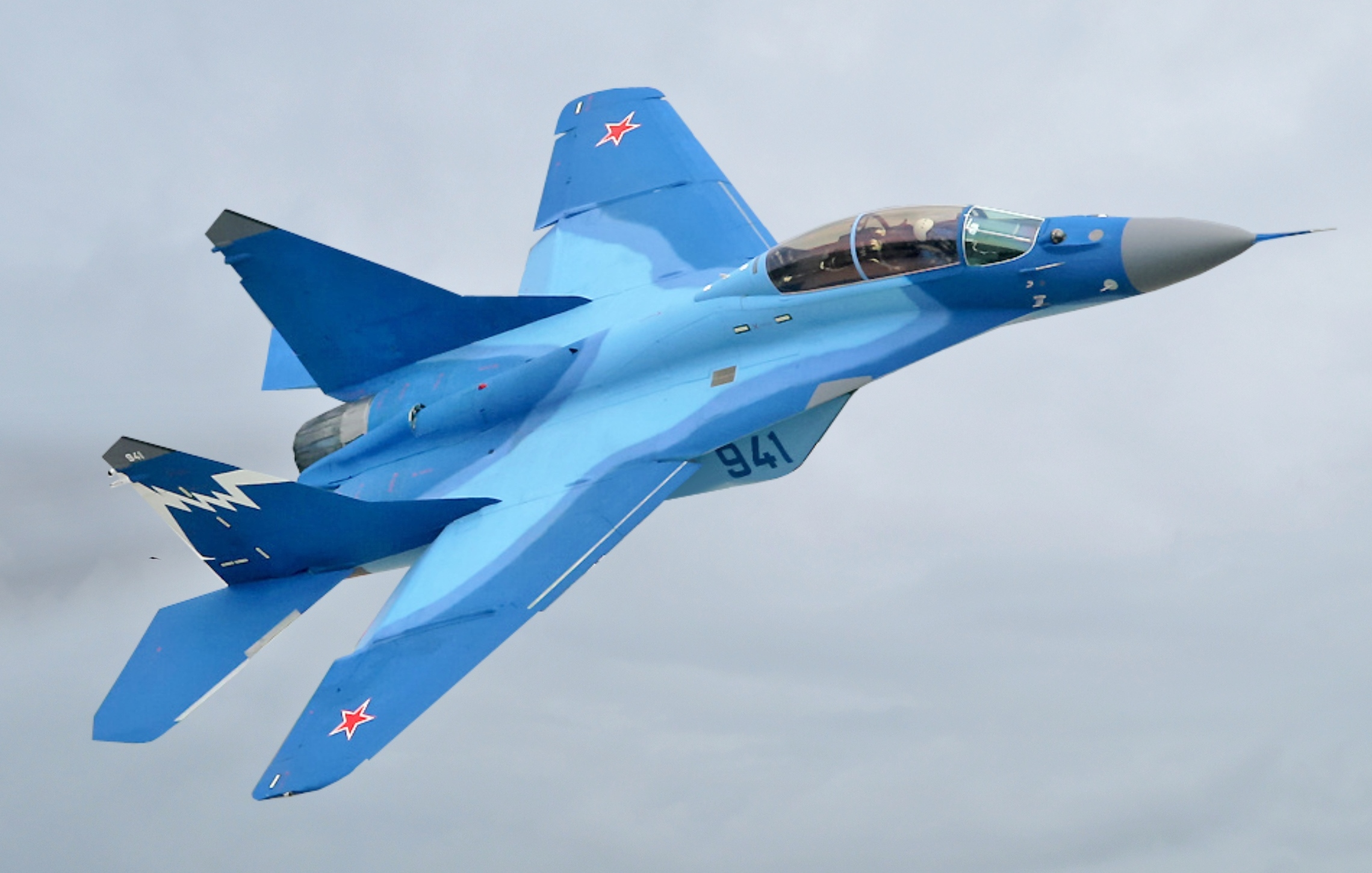
Mikoyan MiG-29

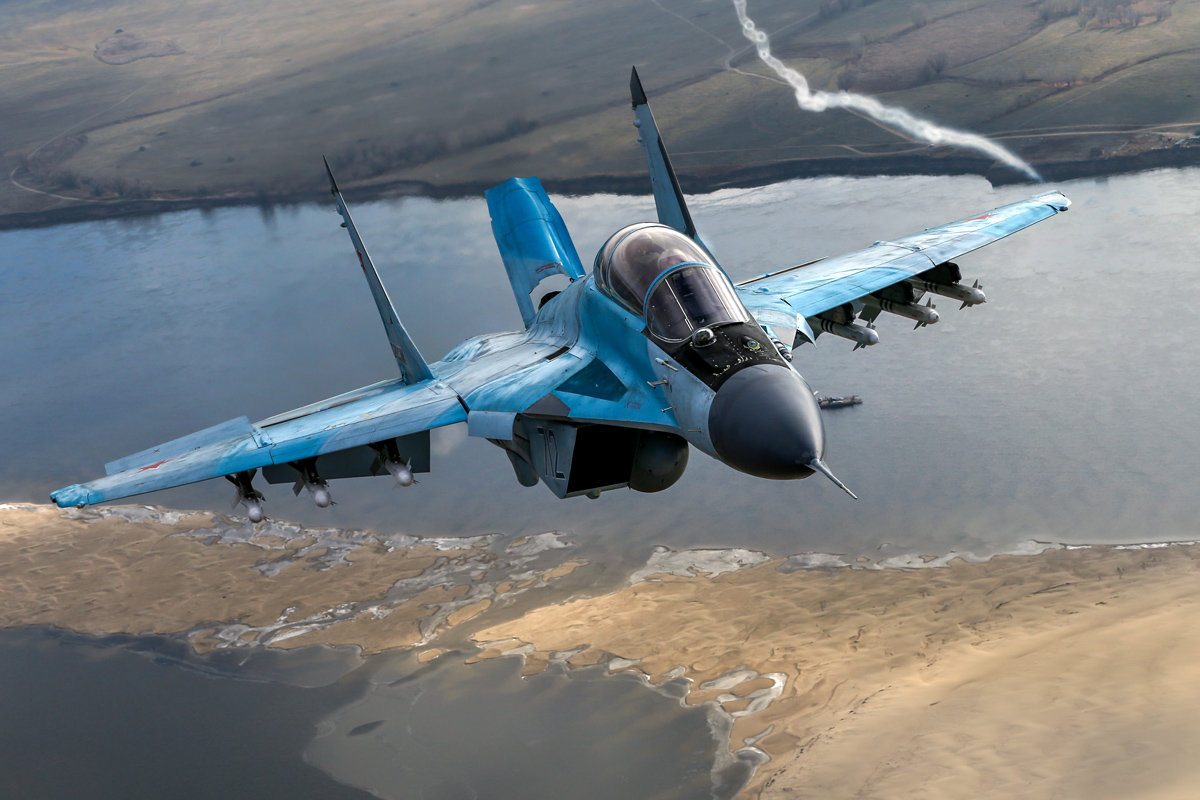
Mikoyan MiG-35

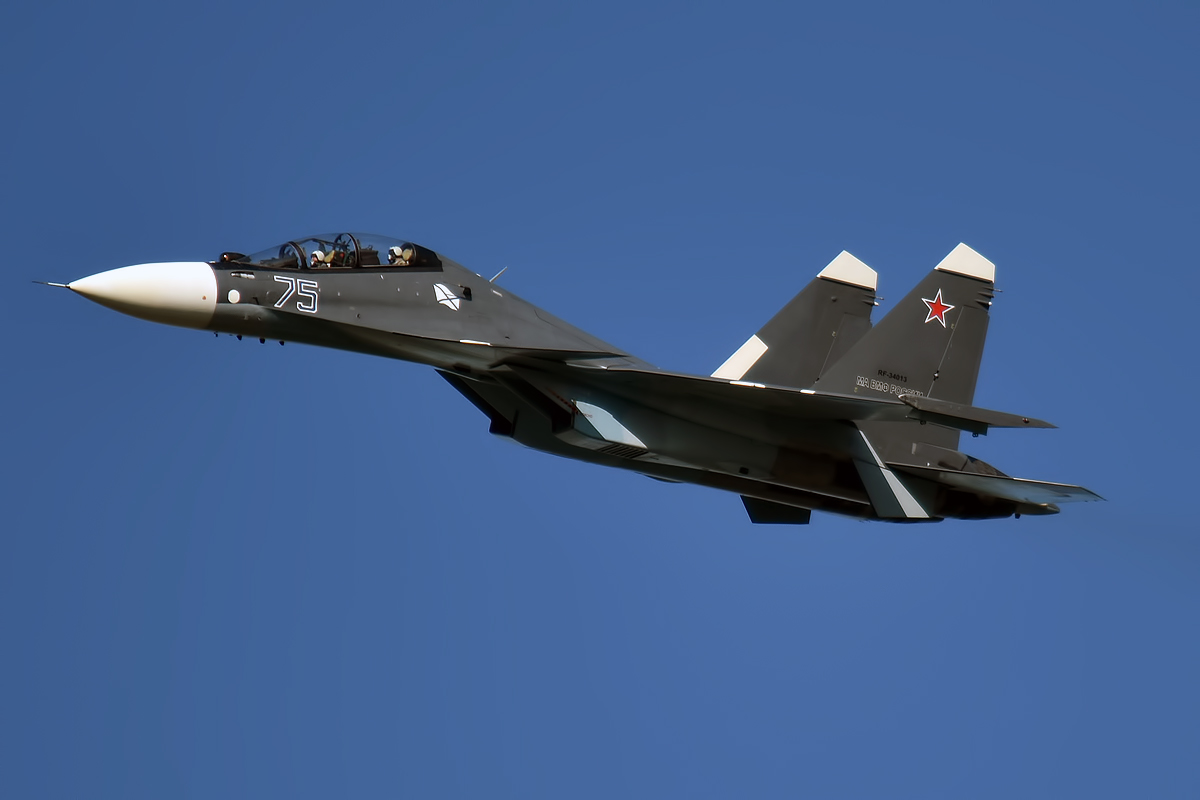
Sukhoi Su-30

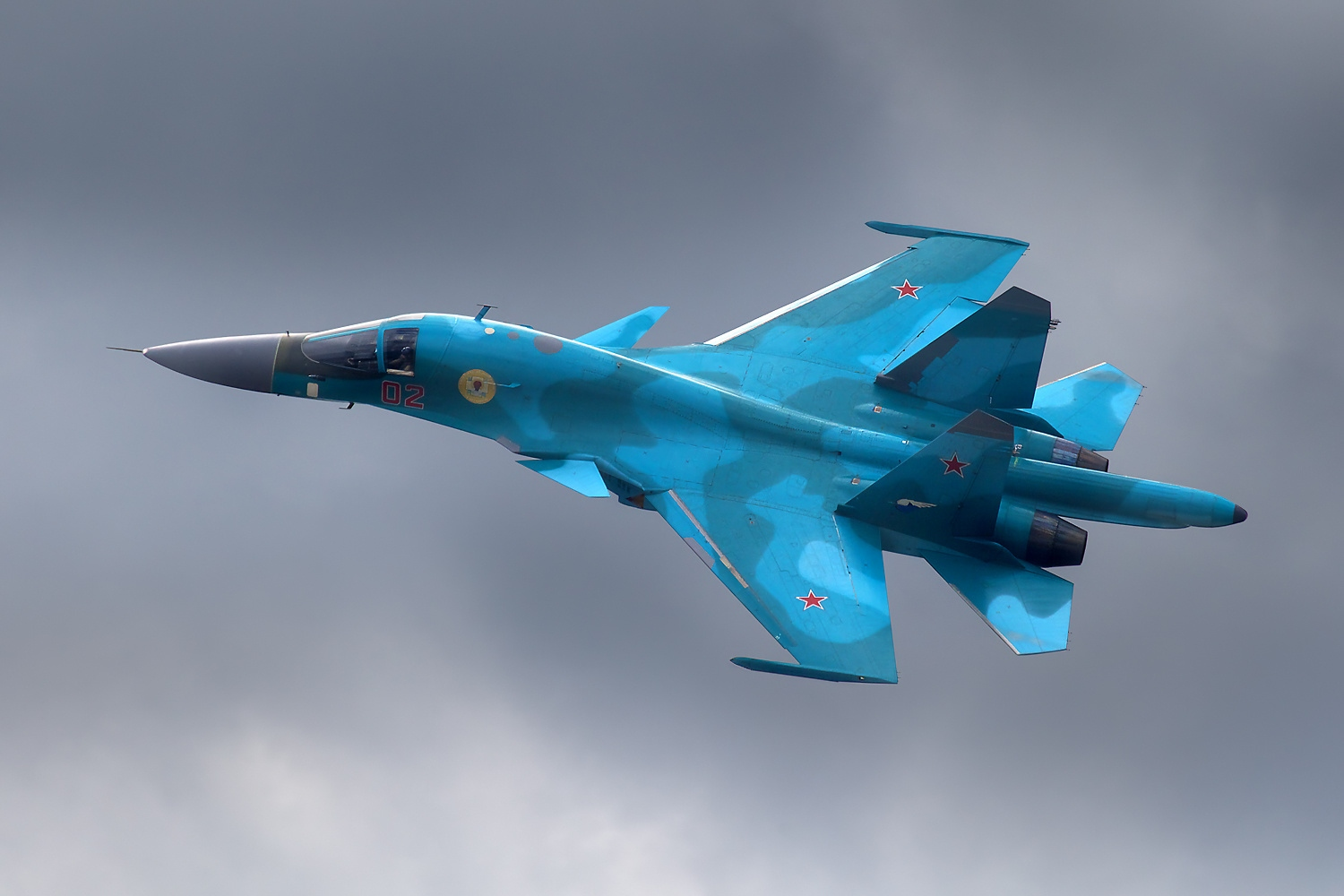
Sukhoi Su-34

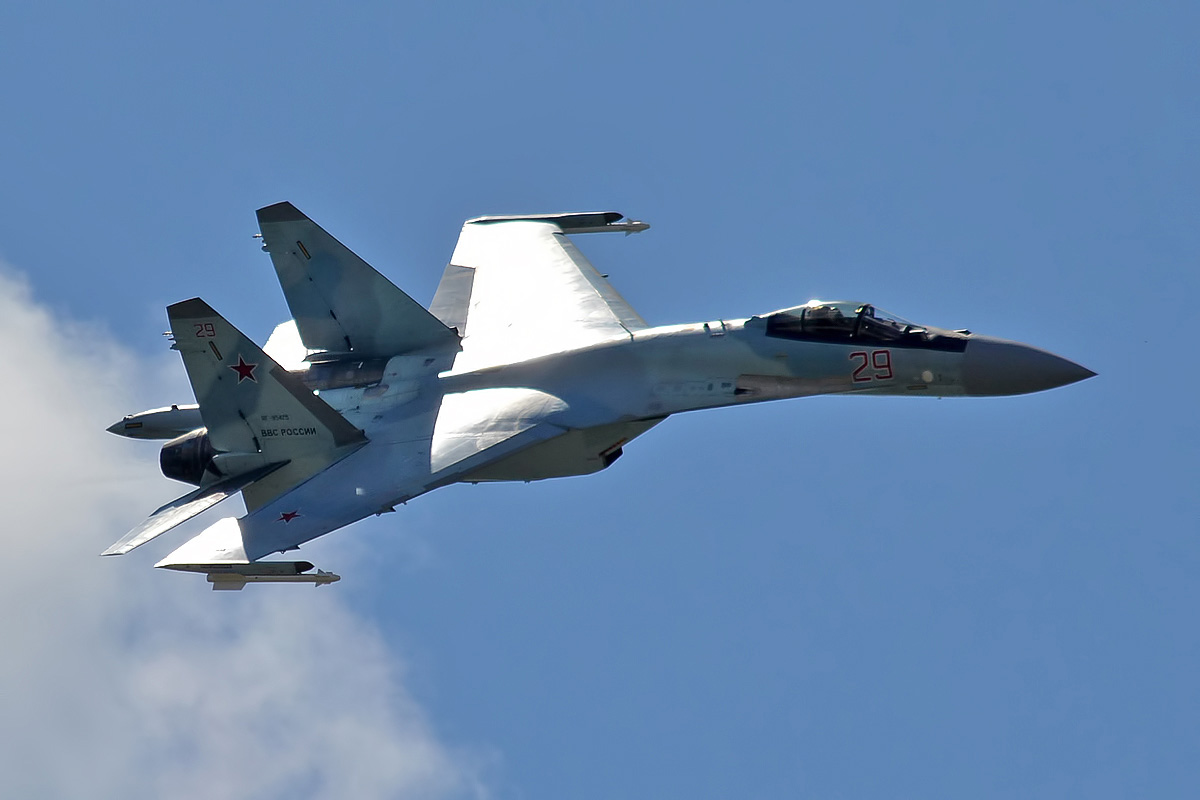
Sukhoi Su-35

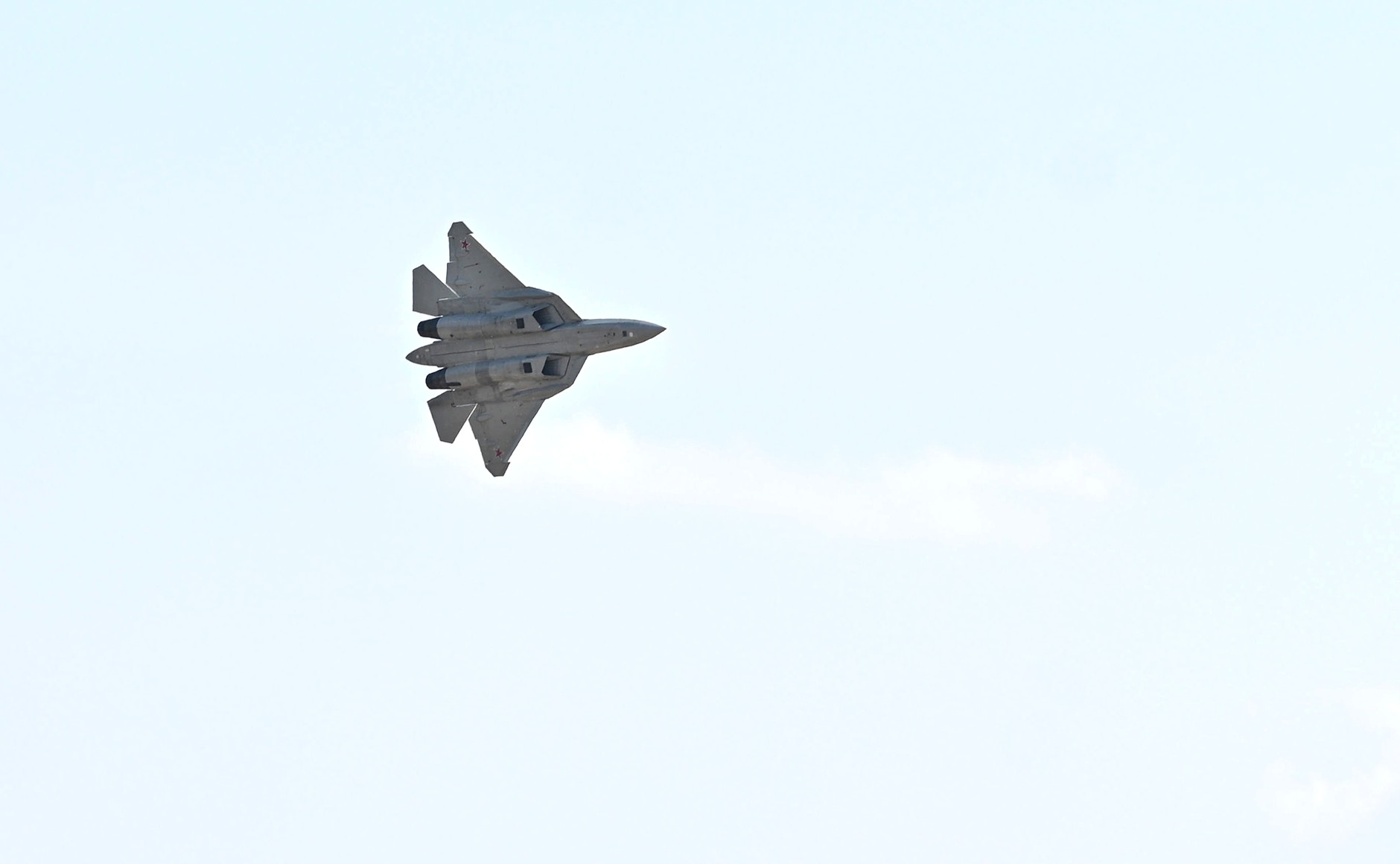
Sukhoi Su-57

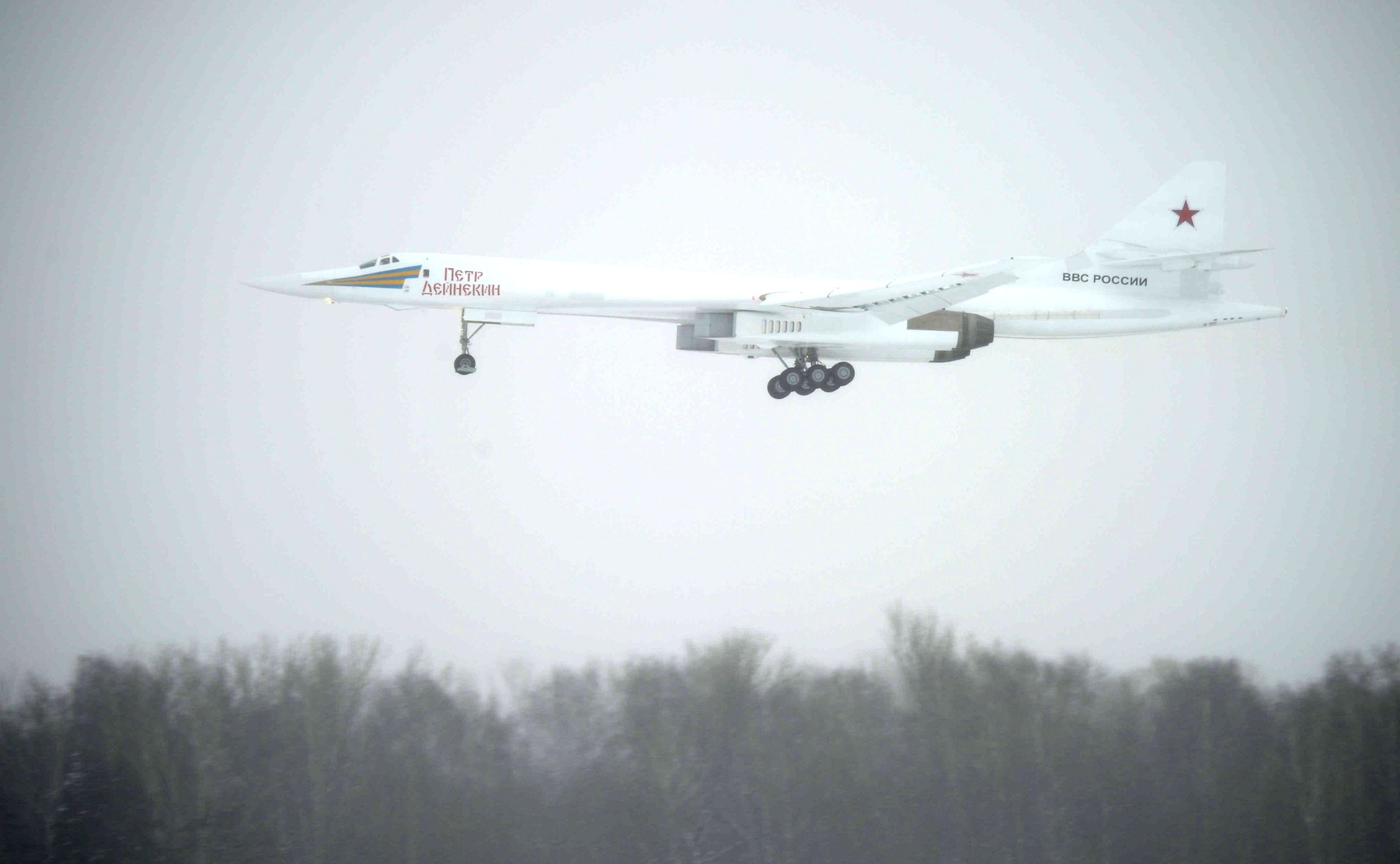
Tupolev Tu-160

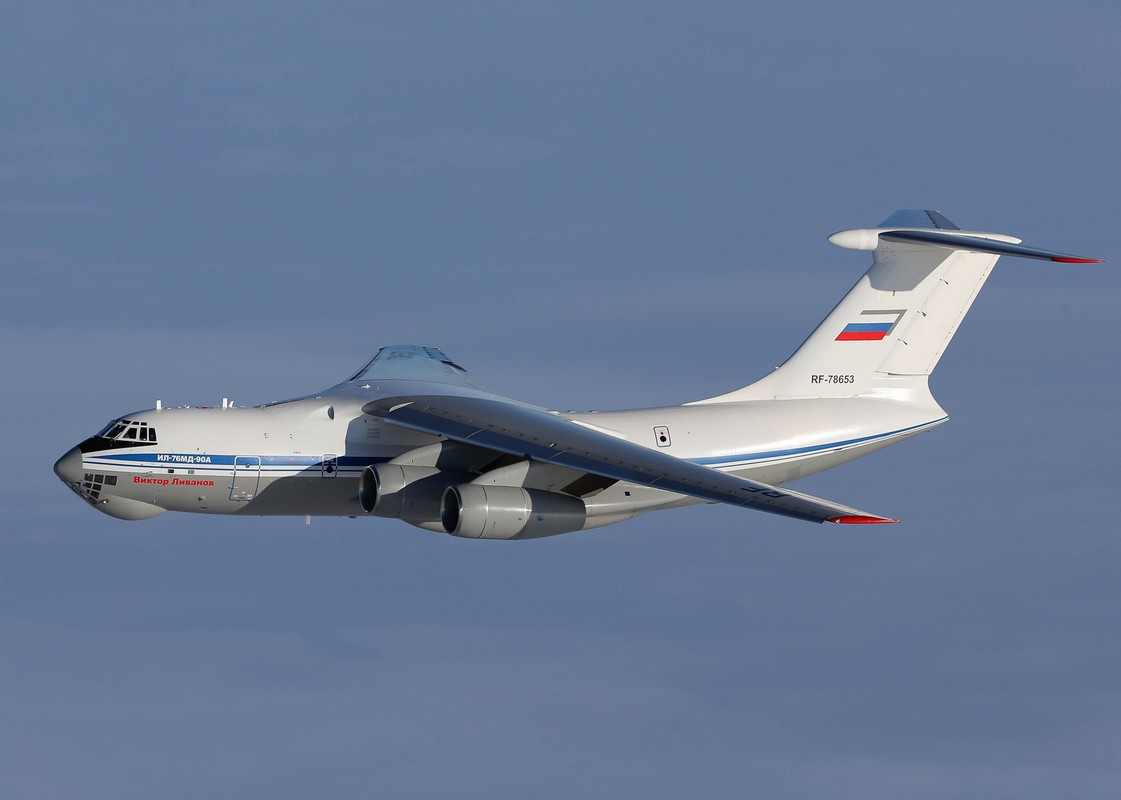
Ilyushin Il-76

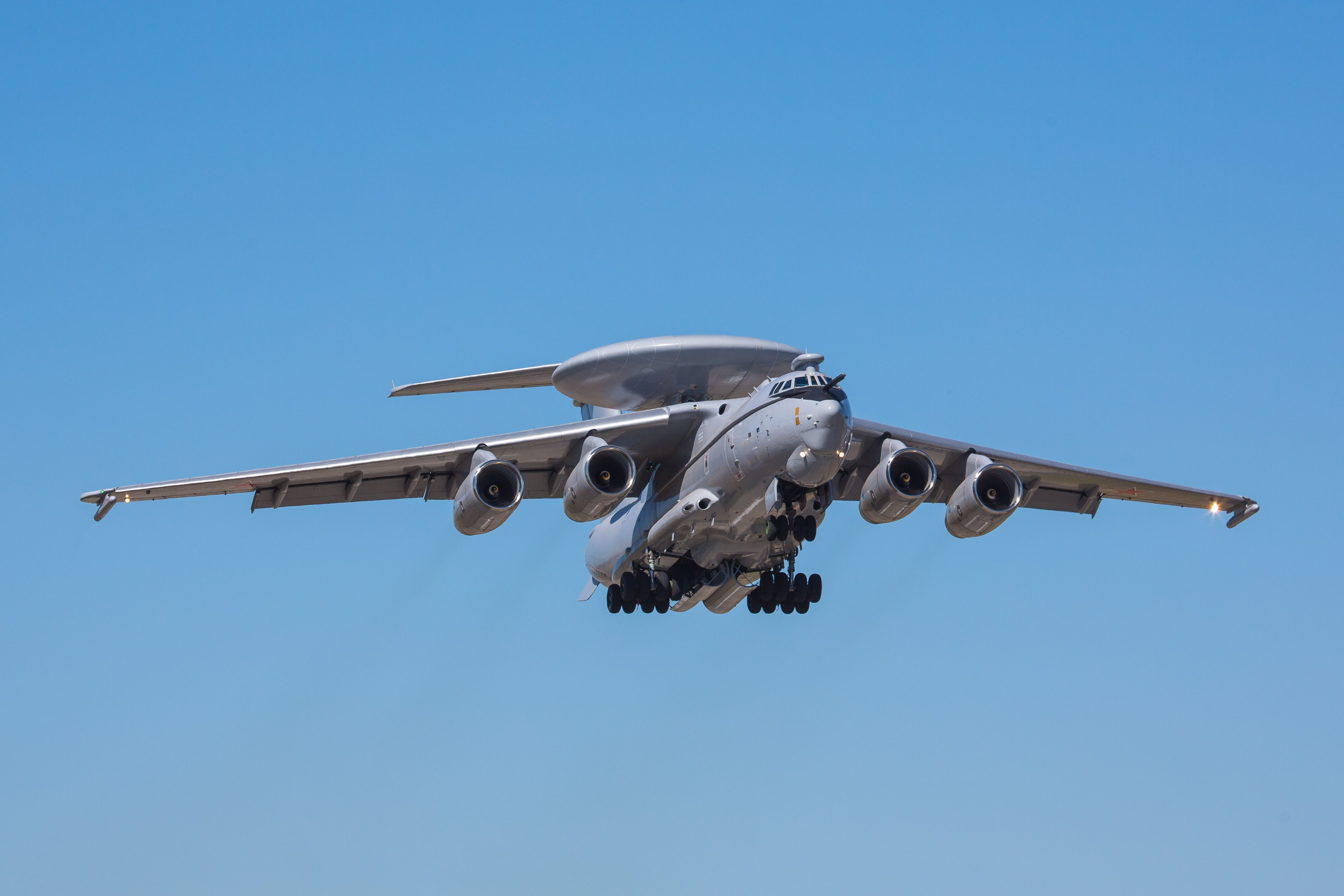
Beriev A-100

==== Irkutsk Aviation Plant ====
In November 2025, an unspecified number of Su-30 multirole aircraft were delivered to the Russian Navy. Several batches of aircraft were also exported to Belarus, completing the contract signed at the 2017 Paris Air Show.

==== Kazan Aviation Plant ====
In December 2025, Russian Defence Minister Andrei Belousov reported that two newly-built Tupolev Tu-160M strategic bombers had entered service with the Russian Air Force.

==== Komsomolsk-on-Amur Aircraft Plant ====
In 2025, the Komsomolsk-on-Amur Aircraft Plant delivered seven batches of Su-35 air-superiority fighter aircraft to the Russian Air Force in March, May, June, August, September, November and December, with an estimate of 17-20 aircraft delivered. In comparison, approximately 15 aircraft were delivered in 2024. By the end of 2024, approximately 135 aircraft had been delivered since 2012. Furthermore, the delivery of export aircraft to Iran is expected in the near future.

In November 2025, United Aircraft Corporation CEO Vadim Badekha stated that an unspecified foreign partner had received two Su-57E fifth-generation fighter aircraft.

==== Novosibirsk Aircraft Production Association ====
In 2025, the Novosibirsk Aircraft Production Association delivered seven batches of a minimum of 14 Su-34M fighter-bombers in April, July, August, September, October, November and December. A minimum of 10 aircraft had been delivered in 2024. Su-34ME for export to Algeria were also observed.

=== Helicopters ===
Helicopters in production

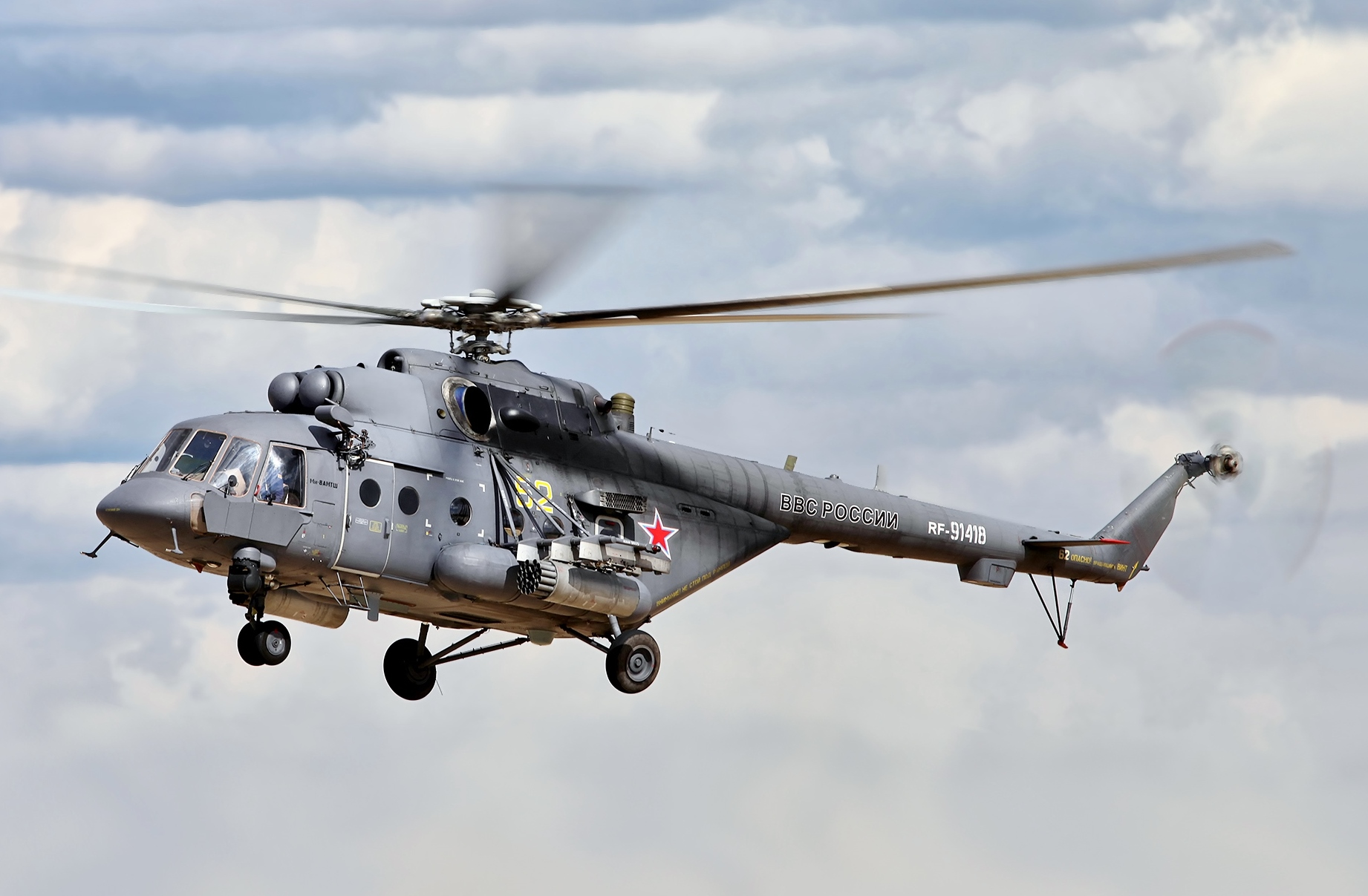
Mil Mi-17

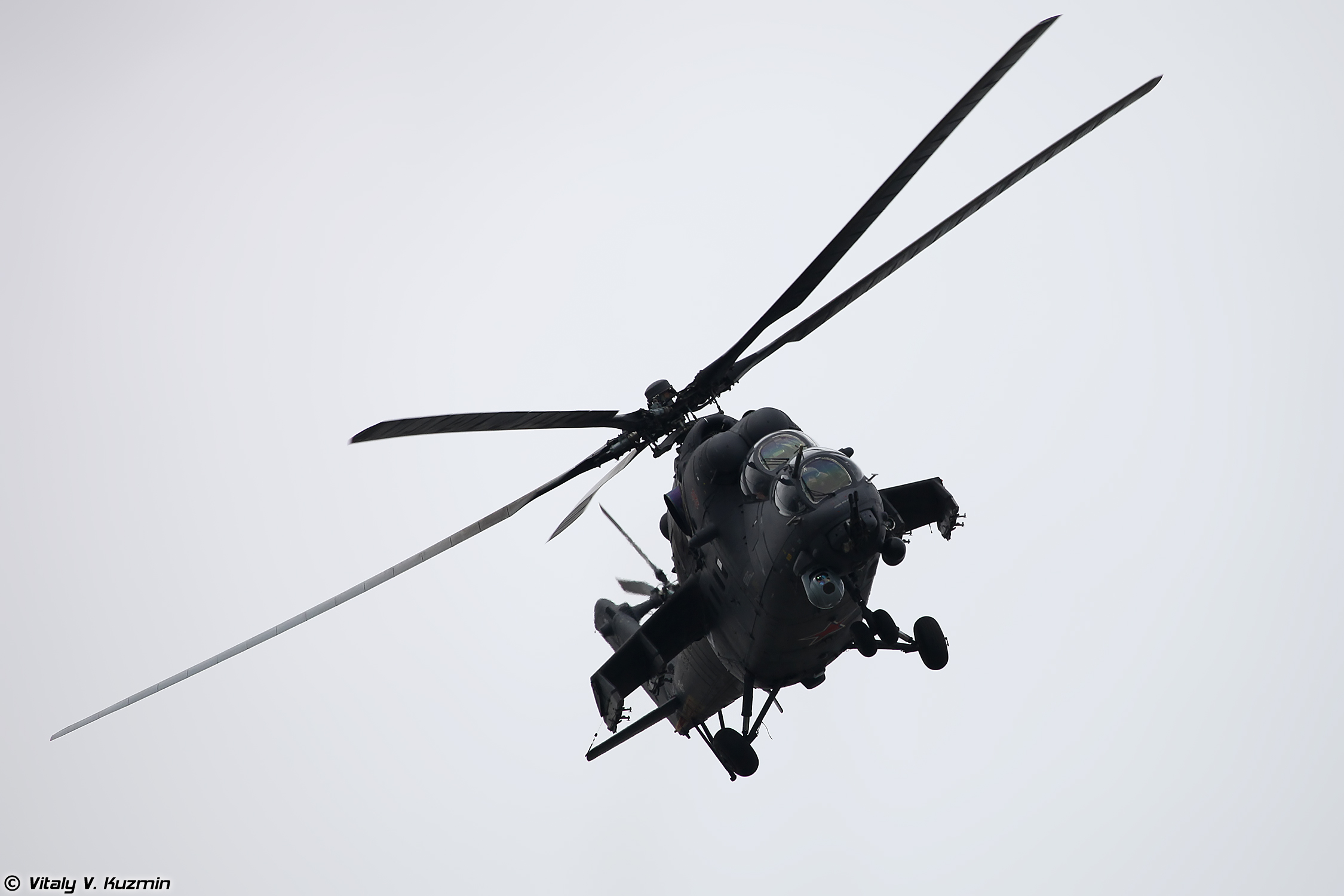
Mil Mi-24

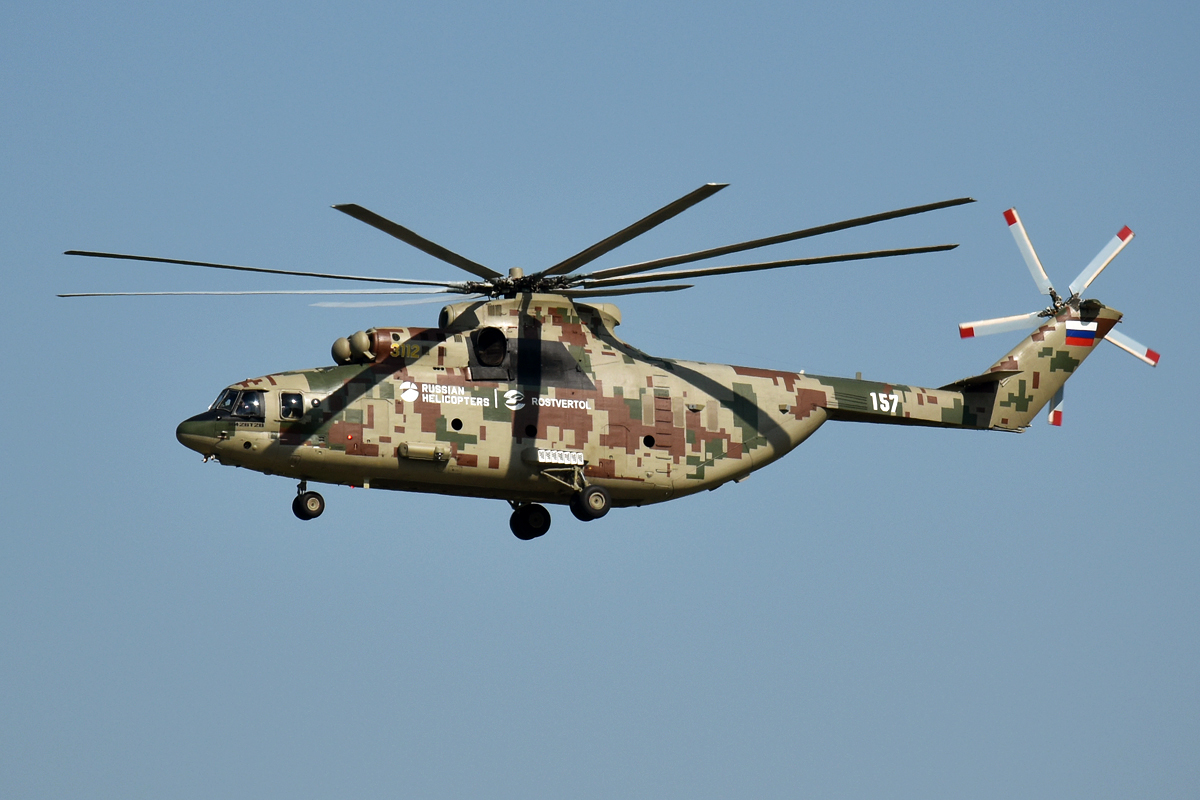
Mil Mi-26

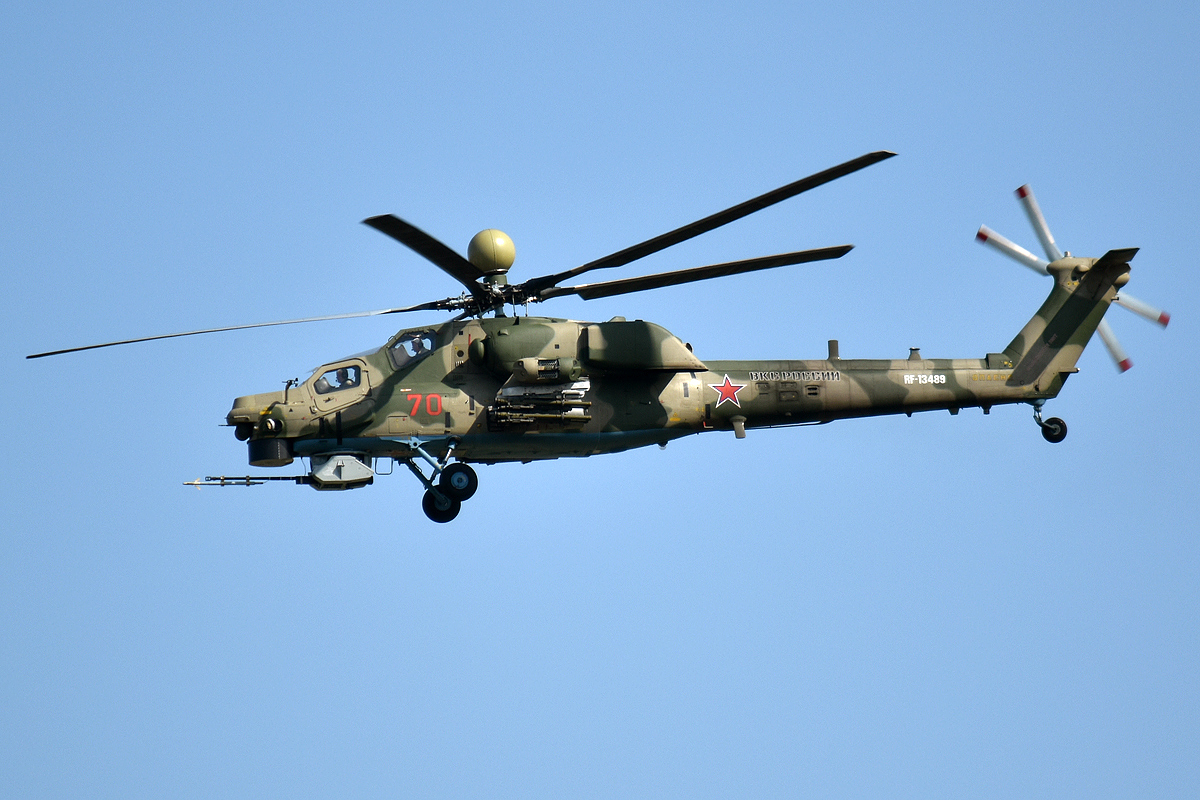
Mil Mi-28

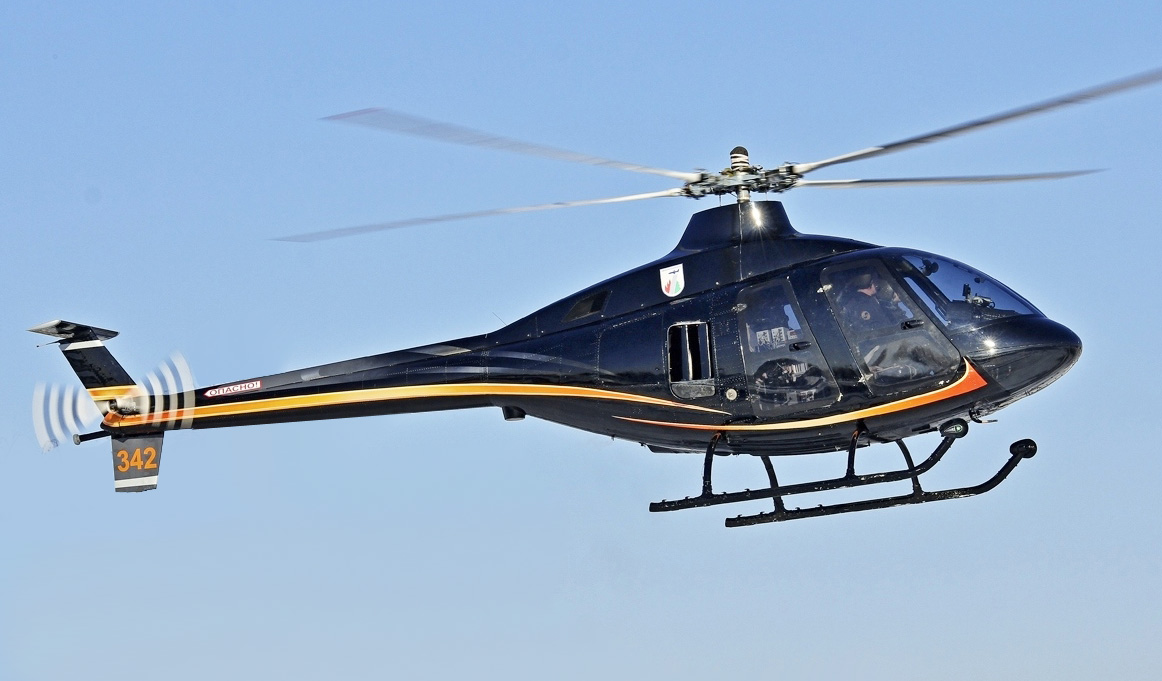
Mil Mi-34

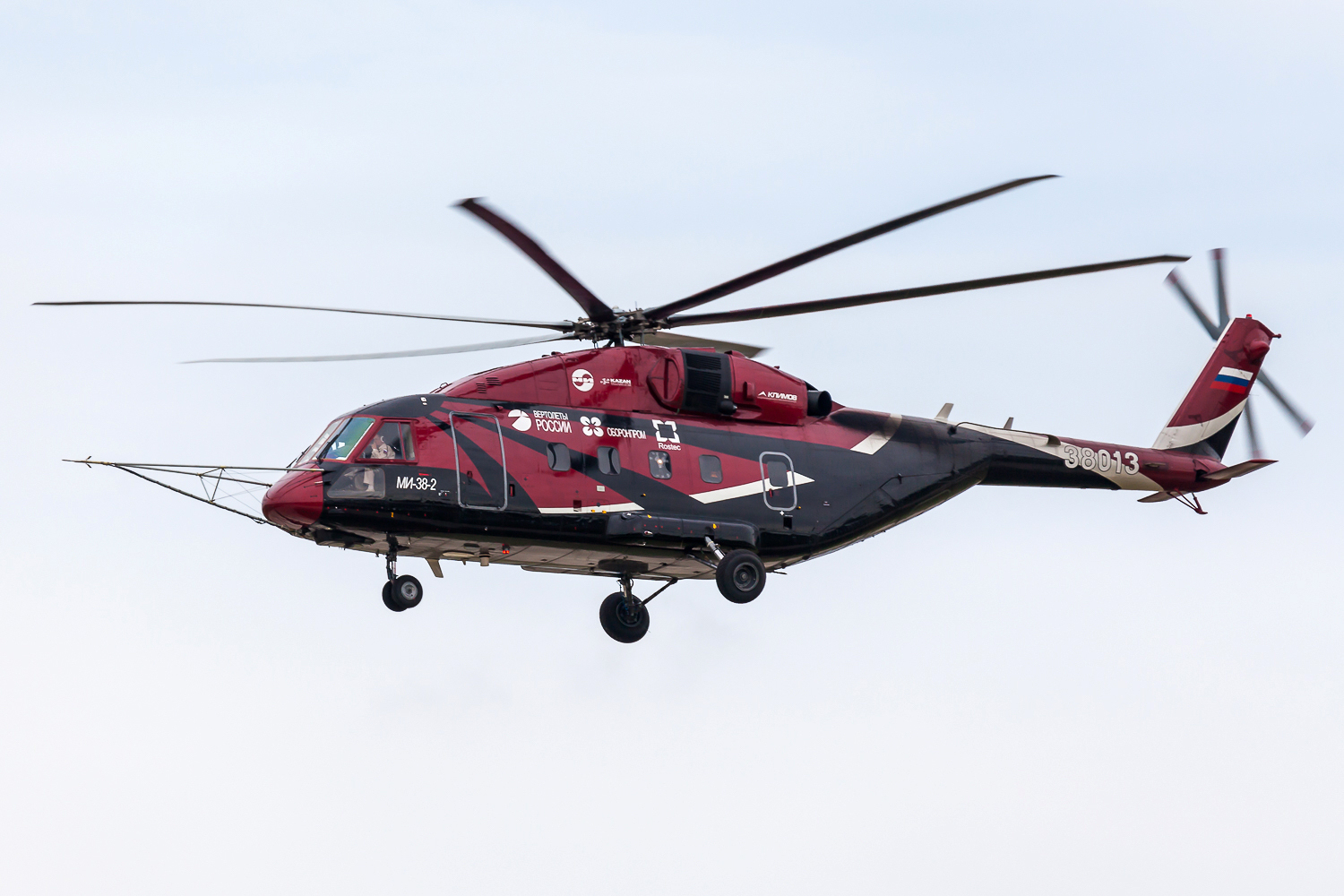
Mil Mi-38

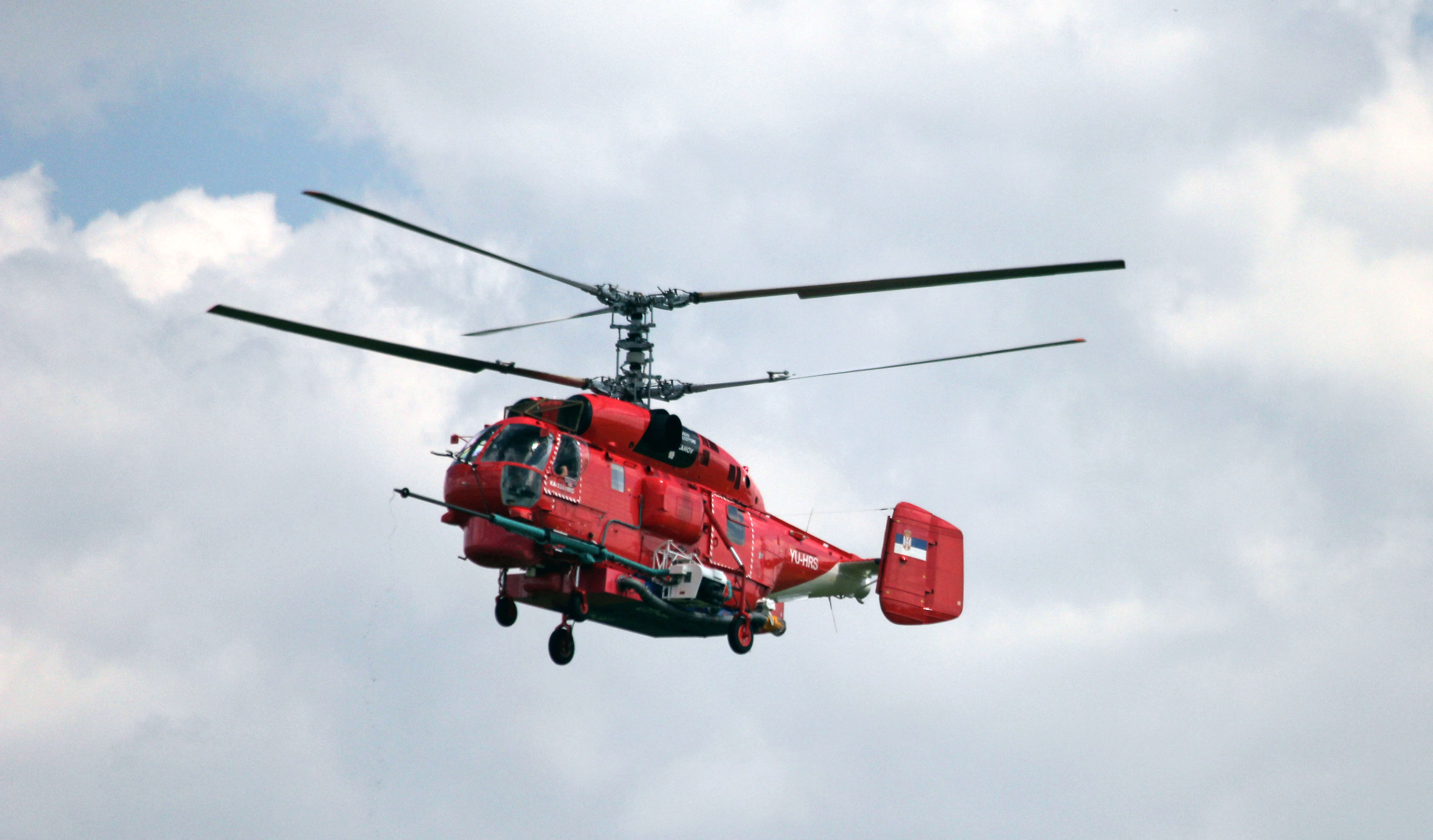
Kamov Ka-32

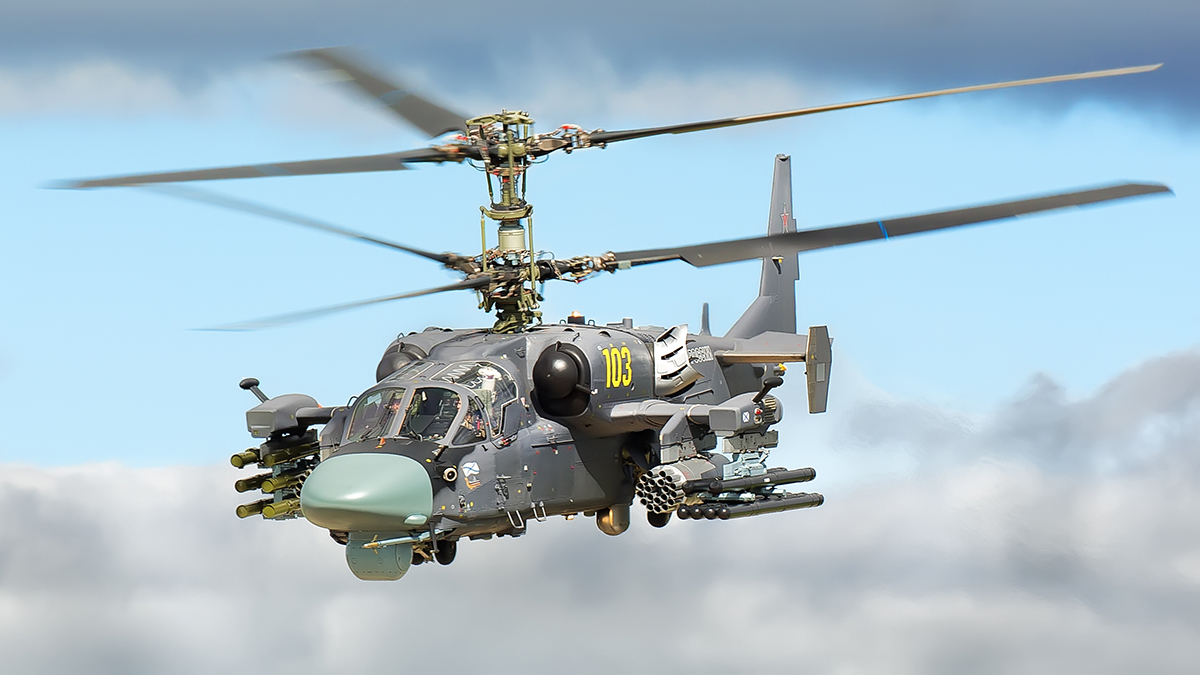
Kamov Ka-52

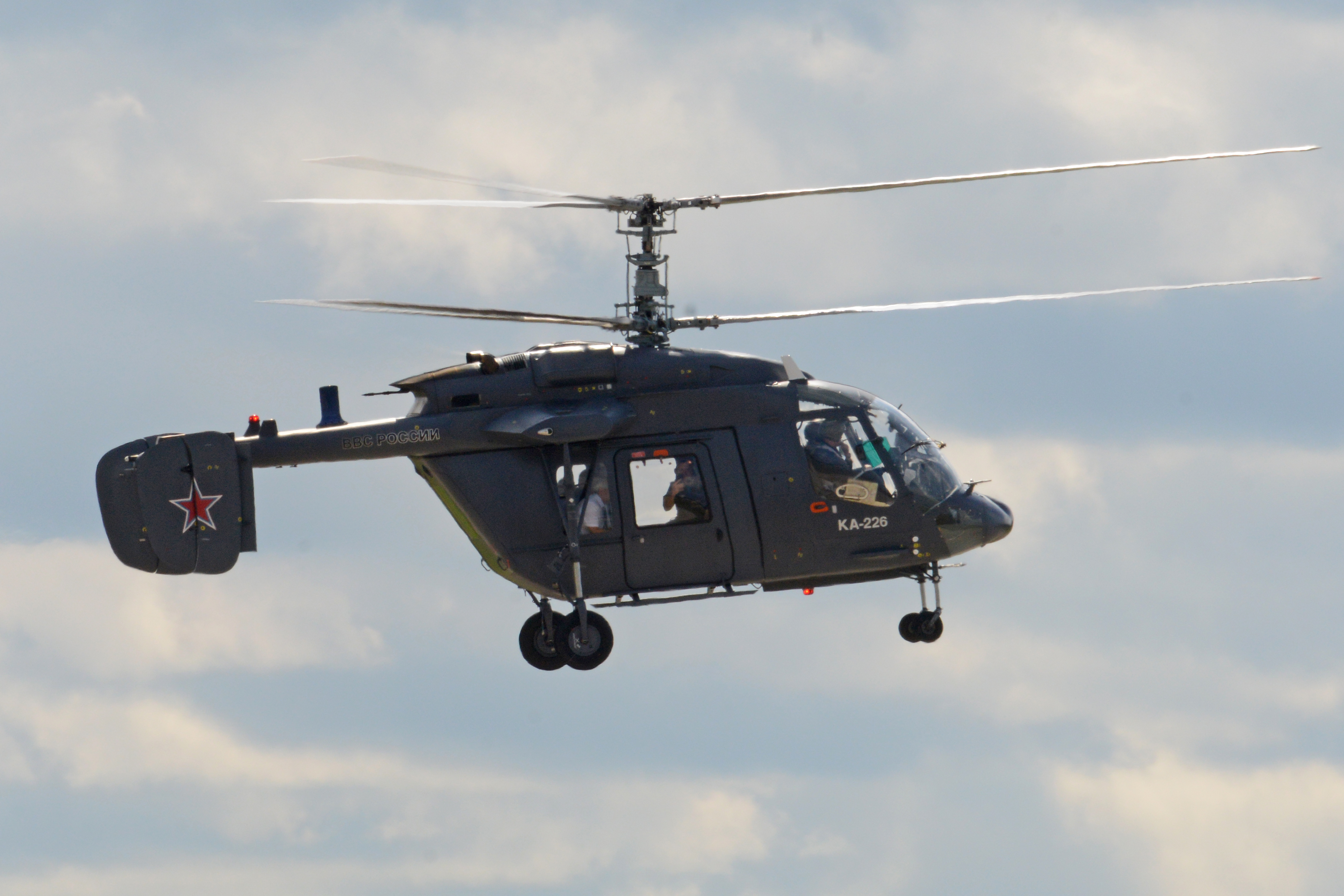
Kamov Ka-226

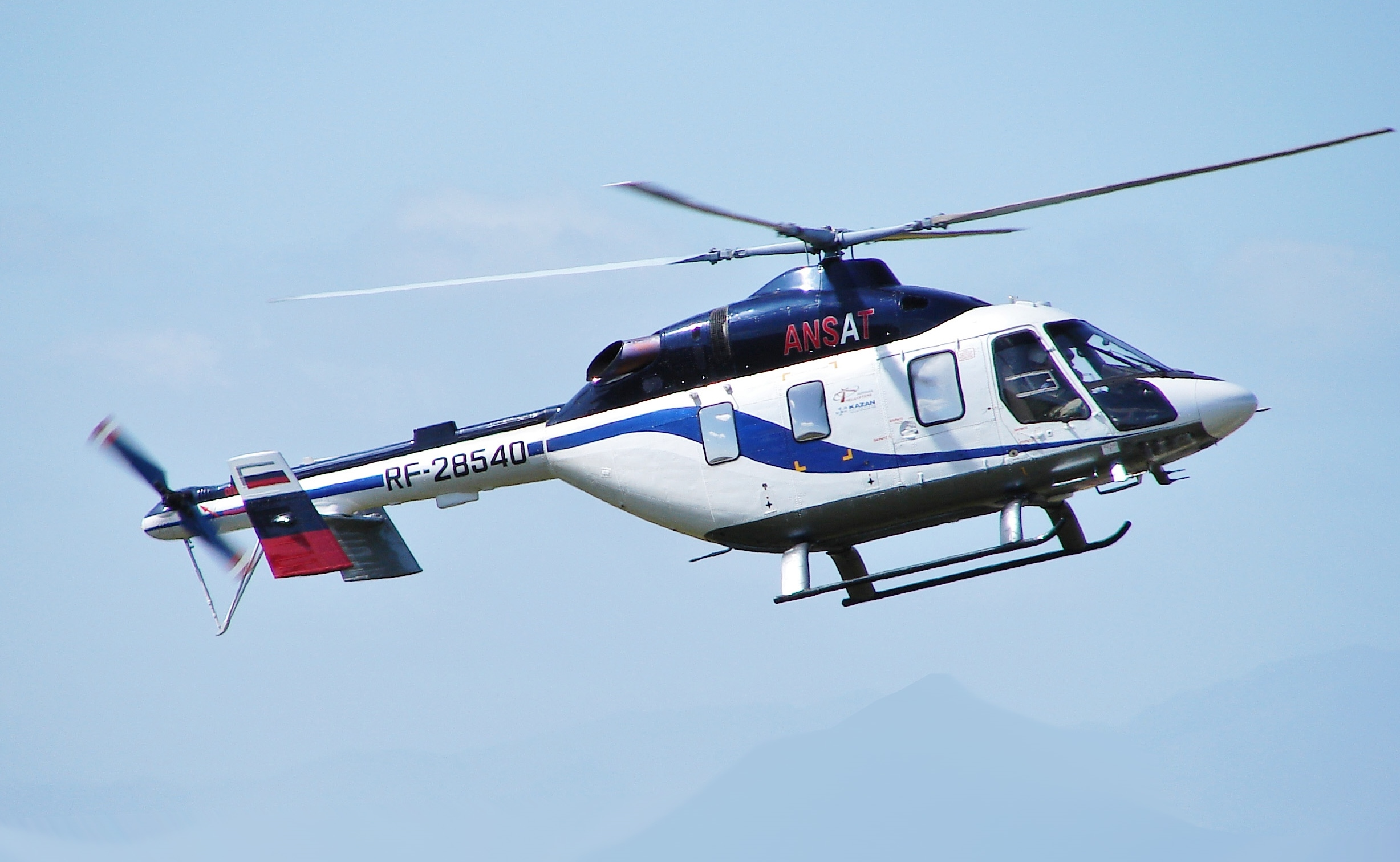
Kazan Ansat

Type	2012
Mi-8 family	193
Mi-35 family	29
Mi-26	7
Mi-28N	18
Ka-31	1
Ka-32А11ВС	5
Ka-52	21
Ka-226	11
Ansat	5
Total	290

Production of the Ka-27/Ka-28/Ka-29/Ka-32 was discontinued in 2010

In 2021 a total of 134 helicopters were manufactured by Russian Helicopters. This rose in 2022 to 296.

=== General aviation ===
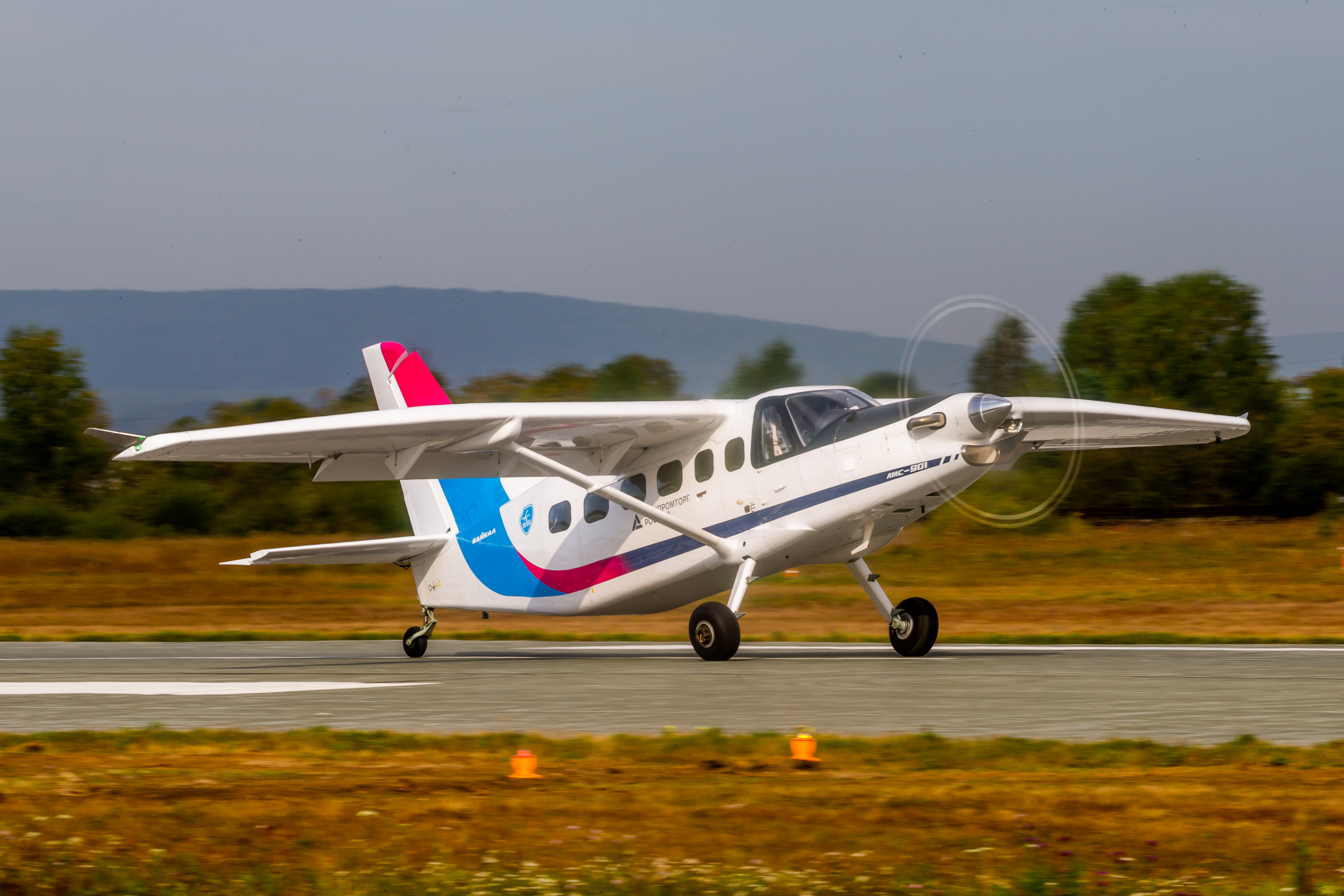
UZGA LMS-901 Baikal

The general aviation fleet in Russia remains dominated by the Soviet era Antonov An-2, with numerous aircraft remaining in service. Several attempts have been made to upgrade existing aircraft, as well as provide a replacement. These include the Antonov An-3 and SibNIA TVS-2, which involve replacing the engine on existing aircraft with turboprop engines. The UZGA LMS-901 Baikal is envisioned as a future replacement for the venerable aircraft, but this is dependent on the successful development of the Klimov VK-800 turboprop engine.

On 30 January 2022, the first prototype LMS-901 made its first flight from Yekaterinburg Aramil Airport. A General Electric H80 engine was installed on the aircraft, pending the development completion of the VK-800. In September 2024, the President of Russia Vladimir Putin ordered the LMS-901 into serial production, although its intended VK-800SM engine is not expected to be certified until 2025, with deliveries of the engine not expected until 2026.

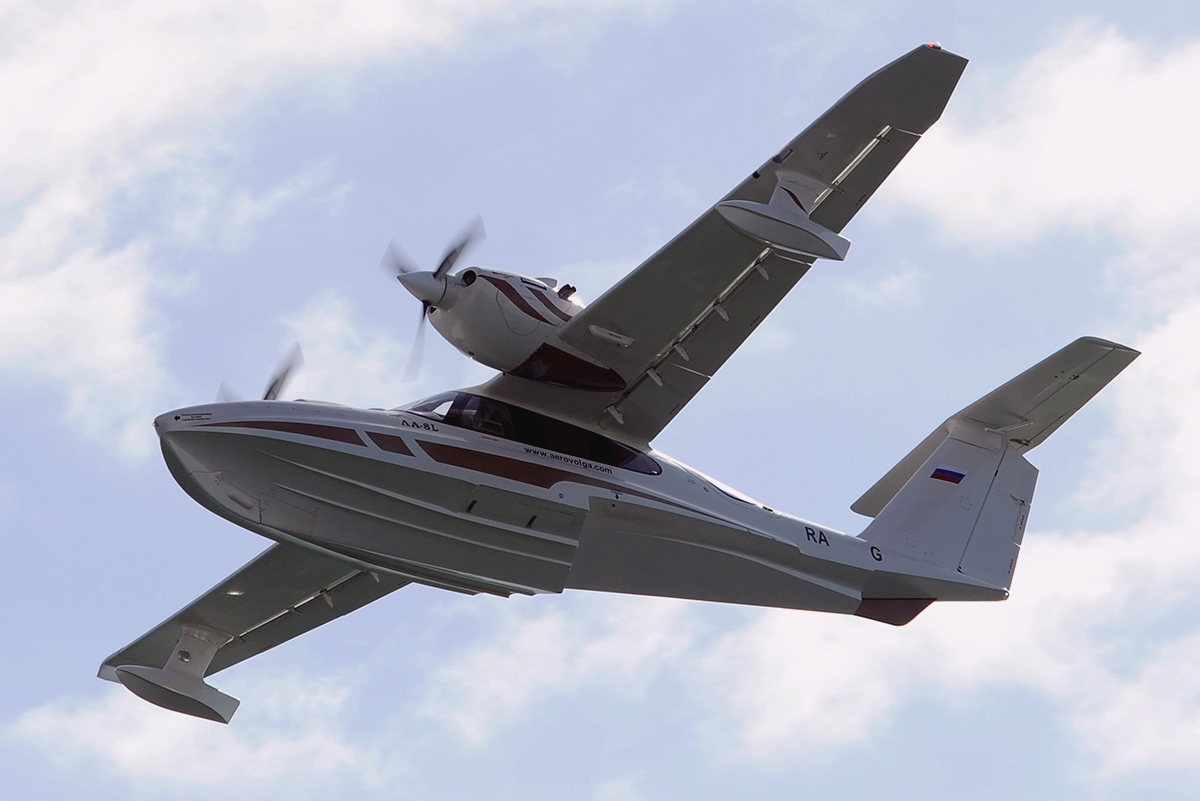
An AeroVolga La-8 twin-engine light flying boat.

The company AeroVolga, based in Samara produce a number of amphibious twin-engine light aircraft, including the AeroVolga LA-8 and AeroVolga Borey light flying boats.

Licensed production of the Diamond DA40 and Diamond DA42 light aircraft take place at the Ural Works of Civil Aviation. Additionally, the production of the UTS-800, a local derivative of the Diamond DART is planned.

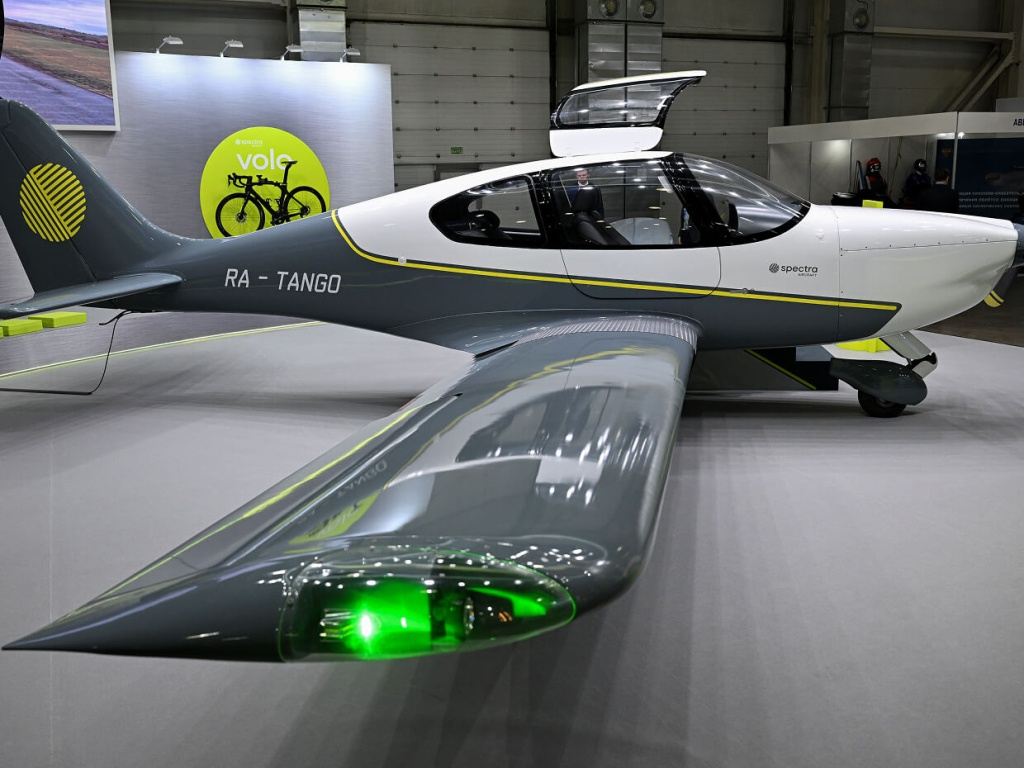
Spectra PV-10 Tango

In late 2022, development of a new four seat trainer aircraft began by the private firm Spectra Aircraft, a subsidiary of the S7 Aerospace Corporation. Prior to this, a number of facilities had been built by the company at Torbeyevo Aerodrome in Moscow Oblast, to house the companies aircraft production, as well as flight training facilities. In 2023, the first prototype aircraft was revealed as the Spectra PV-10 Tango. It was stated that the aircraft was entirely made of domestically produced composite materials. The first flight of the PV-10 Tango took place on 21 September 2024 at Torbeyevo Aerodrome in Moscow Oblast, piloted by SIBNIA test pilot Vladimir Barsuk. The test aircraft was equipped with a Belgian ULPower UL520, but serial aircraft are expected to be built with the APD-520 engine, also made by S7 Aerospace. According to S7 CEO Vladislav Filov, the primary use case of the aircraft would be for use in civil aviation flight schools and aero clubs.

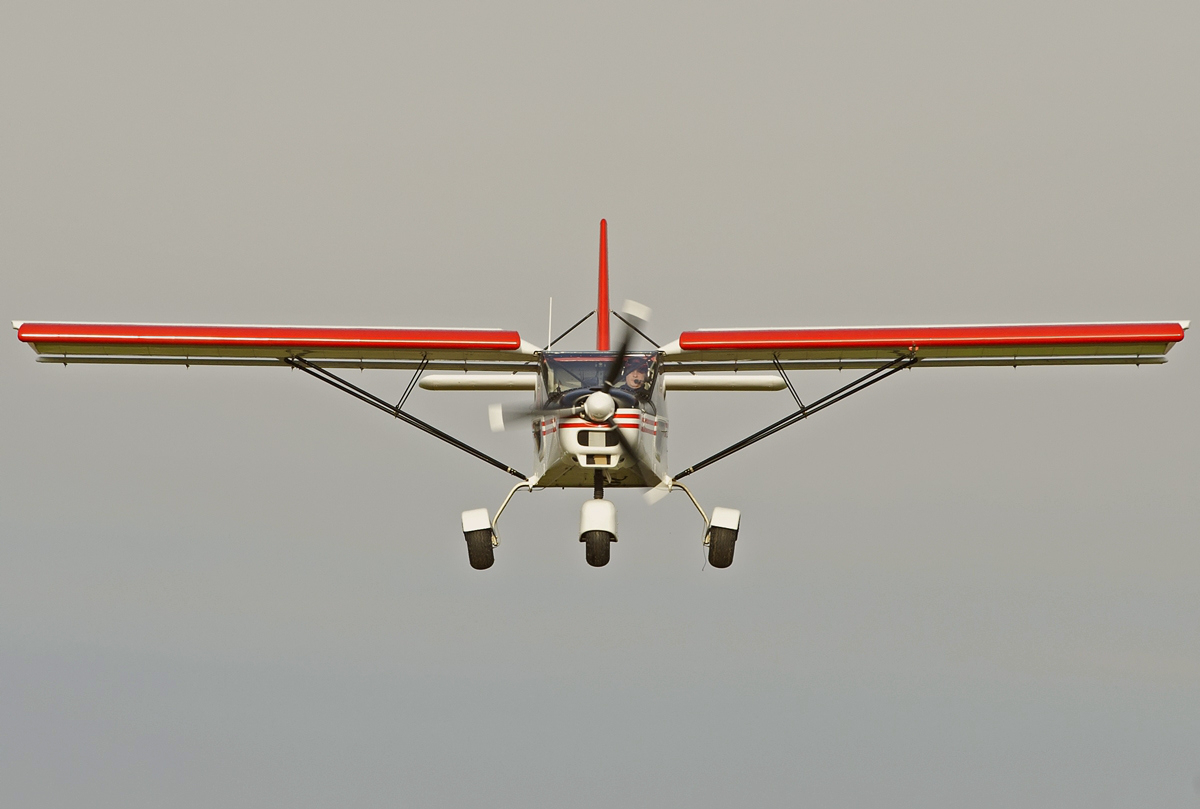
A Spectra Aero SP-30 bush plane. The aircraft is specifically built to withstand the harsh conditions of remote and undeveloped areas.

The assembly of bush flying aircraft is conducted by the First Experimental Design Bureau in Taganrog, producing the Spectra Aero SP-30 bush plane based on the Canadian Zenith STOL CH 701. More than 250 aircraft have reportedly been produced. The aircraft is specifically built to withstand the harsh conditions of remote and undeveloped areas, and can operate under STOL conditions.

Earlier models of the aircraft used Austrian origin Rotax 912 engines. These were later replaced with Zongshen C-100 engines of a similar specification. The further localisation of aircraft components is planned.

The light aircraft industry remains bottlenecked by the lack of available engine options. While a number of prospects are underway to address this issue through import substitution, this issue will need to be addressed in order to achieve reliable serial production.

== International cooperation ==
=== Belarus ===
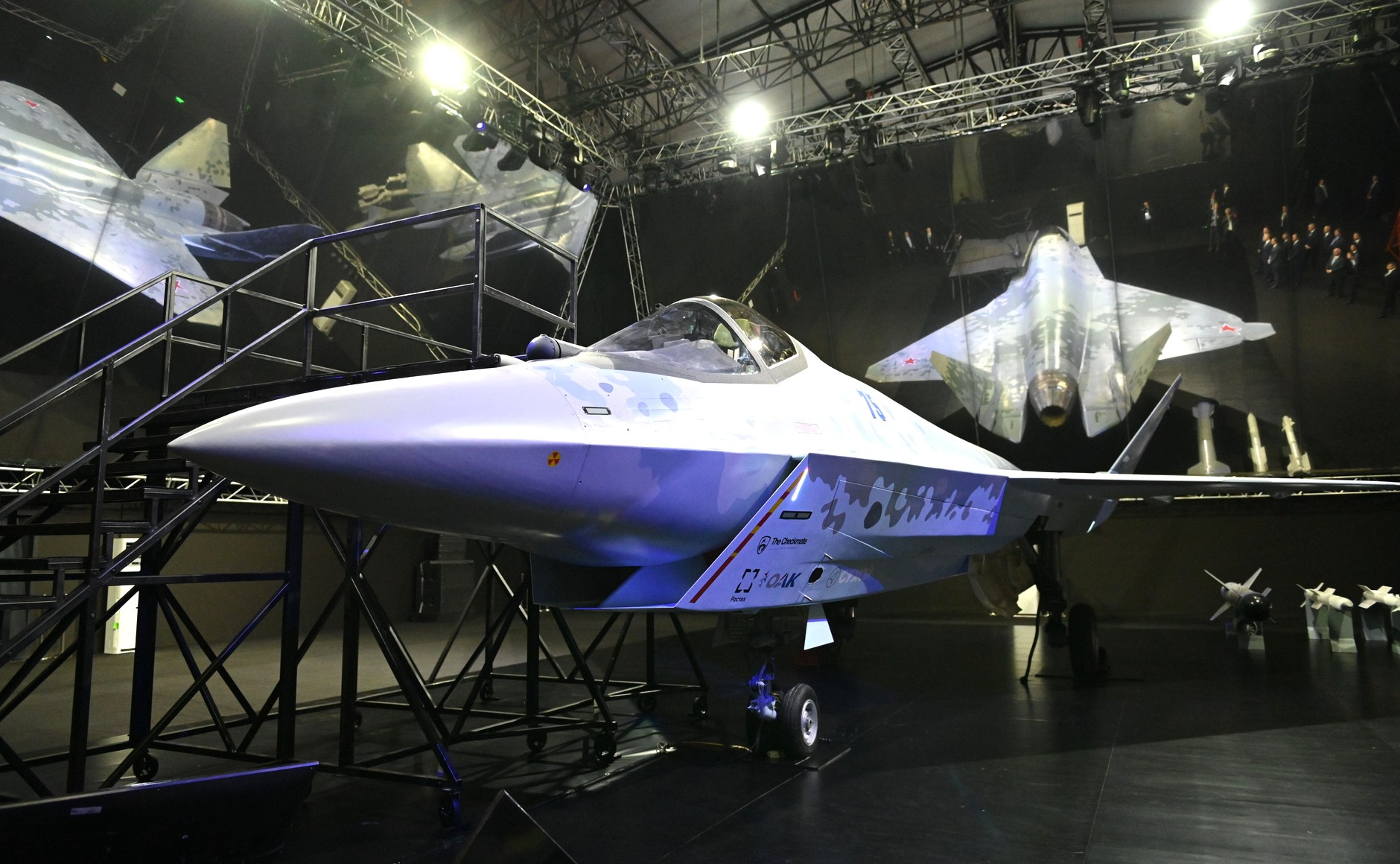
Sukhoi Su-75 Checkmate

==== Military aircraft ====
In November 2025, it was reported that Belarus was considering joint participation in the Sukhoi Su-75 Checkmate project.

==== Civil aircraft ====
A joint venture between Ural Works of Civil Aviation (UZGA) and the 558th Aircraft Repair Plant based in Baranovichi aims to produce a utility aircraft, namely the LMS-192 Osvey, based on an earlier design study conducted by UZGA and its partner Diamond Aircraft. The aircraft is named after Lake Osveya in northern Belarus.

=== India ===
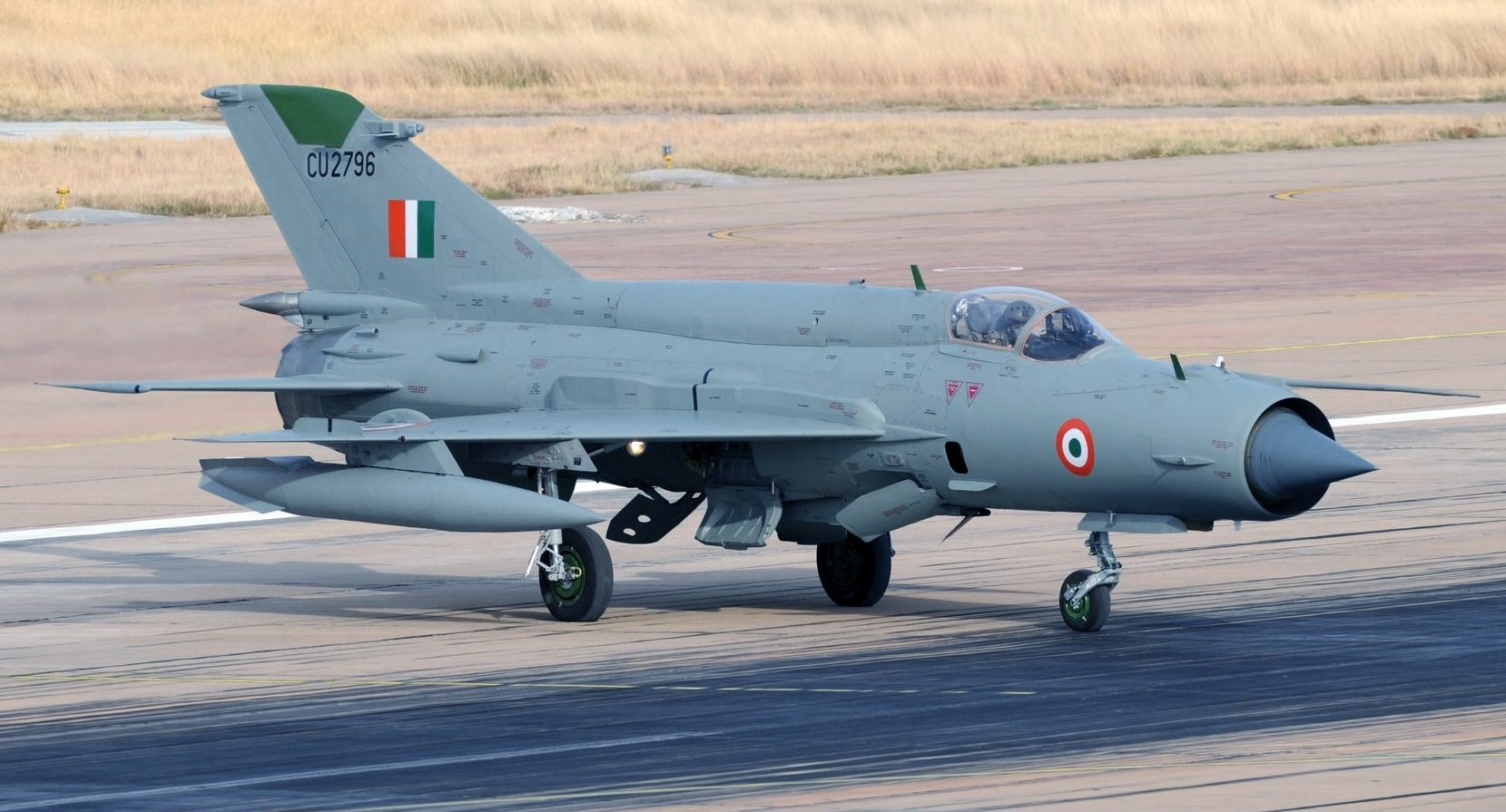
Indian Air Force MiG-21

==== Military aircraft ====
As the Sino-Soviet split deepened, the Soviet Union made a effort to support India, especially with the sale of advanced MiG-21 fighter aircraft. The United States and the United Kingdom refused to sell advanced weaponry to India, further compelling the country to turn to the Soviets for military aid.

The Soviet Union offered India full transfer of technology and rights for local assembly to Hindustan Aeronautics Limited. Subsequently, the MiG-27 attack aircraft was also produced locally by HAL.

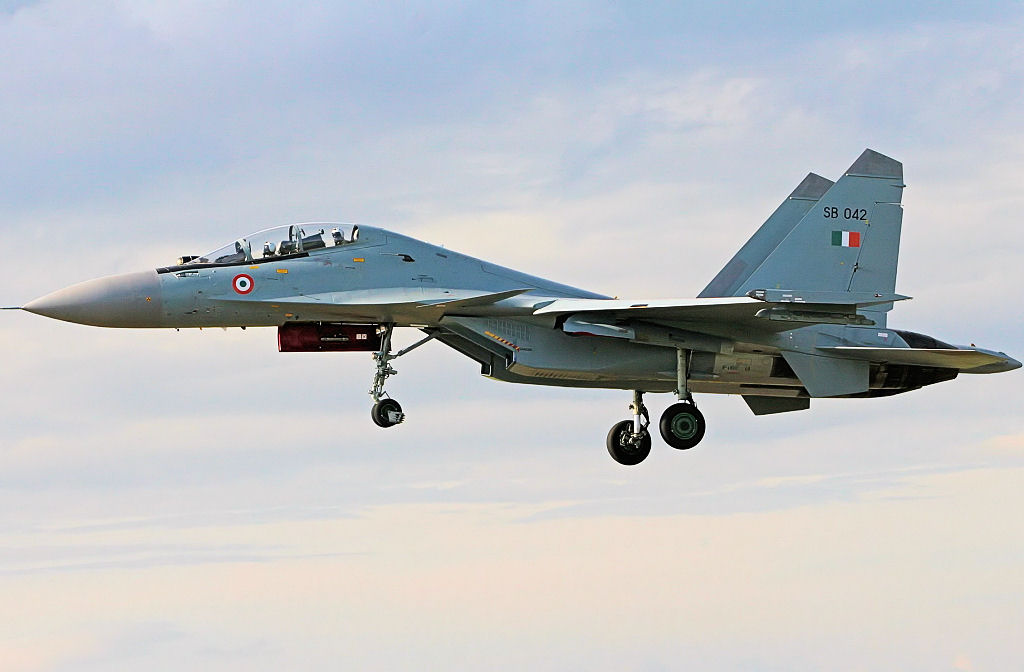
Sukhoi Su-30MKI aircraft are produced under licence by Hindustan Aeronautics in Nashik, India.

Large scale cooperation between India and the Soviet Union in aircraft production increased under the term of Indian Prime Minister Indira Gandhi following the signing of the Indo-Soviet Treaty of Friendship and Cooperation in 1971, in response to closer relations between Pakistan, China and the United States. This was a significant deviation from India's previous position of non-alignment.

This cooperation would continue following the breakup of the Soviet Union, with production and maintenance of the Sukhoi Su-30MKI under licence by HAL beginning in 2004. In 2024, Indian media reported negotiations between HAL and Russia for exporting Indian-produced Su-30MKIs.

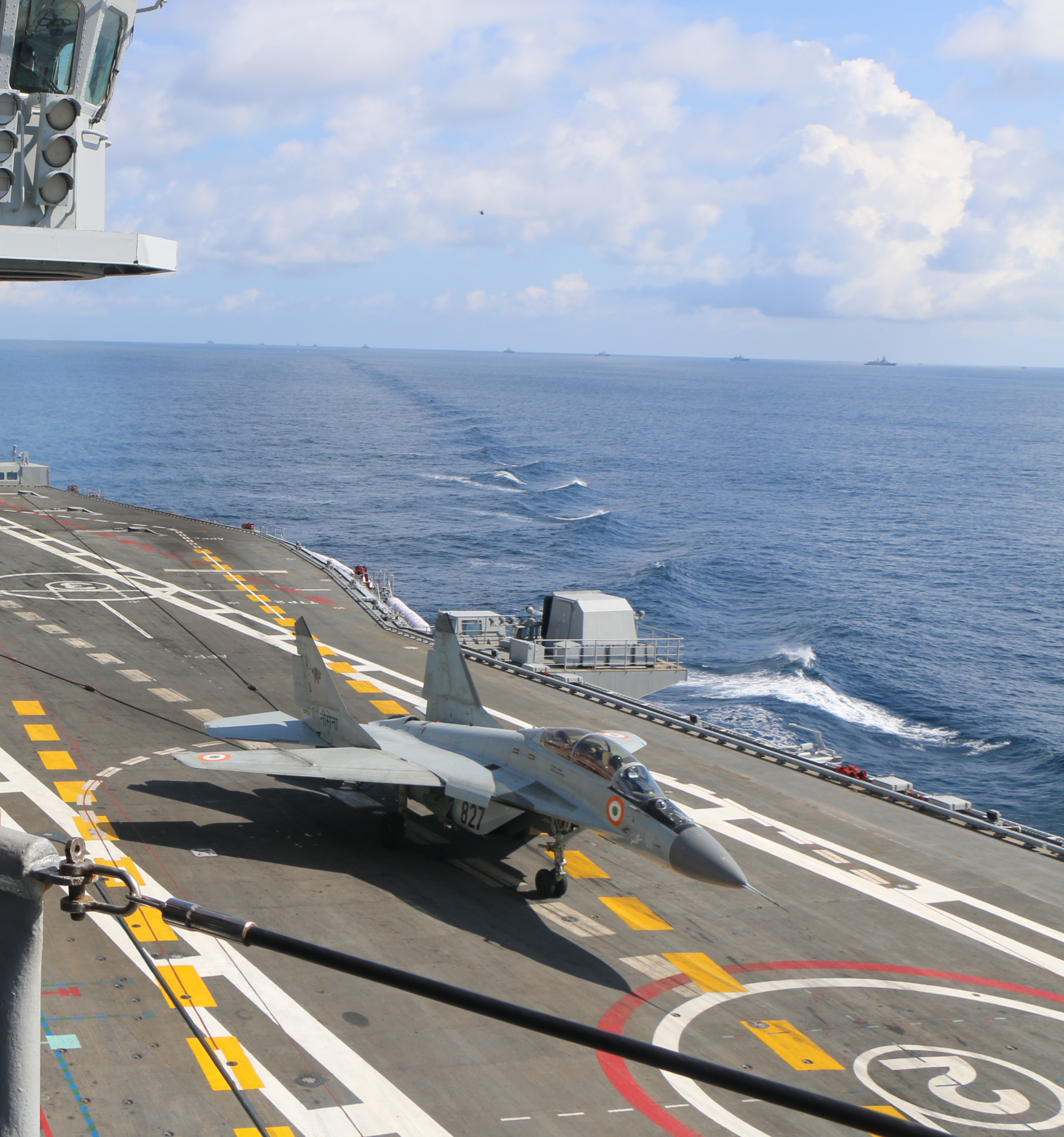
Mikoyan MiG-29K performing an arrested landing on INS Vikramaditya.

The MiG-29K programme was revived in response to the decision of the Indian Navy to acquire the former Russian Navy carrier Kiev-class carrier Admiral Gorshkov, renamed as INS Vikramaditya after undergoing an extensive conversion. The program had previously stalled due to lack of funds, as well as the Russian Navy preferring the Sukhoi Su-33 during the 1990s. Modifications were made to fit Indian requirements, including the Zhuk-ME radar, RD-33MK engines, and updated avionics. This marked the first time a Russian origin aircraft operated from an aircraft carrier, replacing the previous British Aerospace Sea Harrier in Indian Navy service. The improvements made to the MiG-29 were carried over to the Russian Navy, when it ordered a batch of MiG-29KR aircraft for its carrier Admiral Kuznetsov in 2009.

In late 2025, several sources reported that Armenian Air Force was considering a deal for 12 Sukhoi Su-30MKI aircraft from Hindustan Aeronautics Limited, as a counter to the acquisition of JF-17 Thunder fighters by the Azerbaijani Air Force from Pakistan. Armenia already operates a small number of Su-30SM aircraft delivered from Russia.

==== Civil aircraft ====
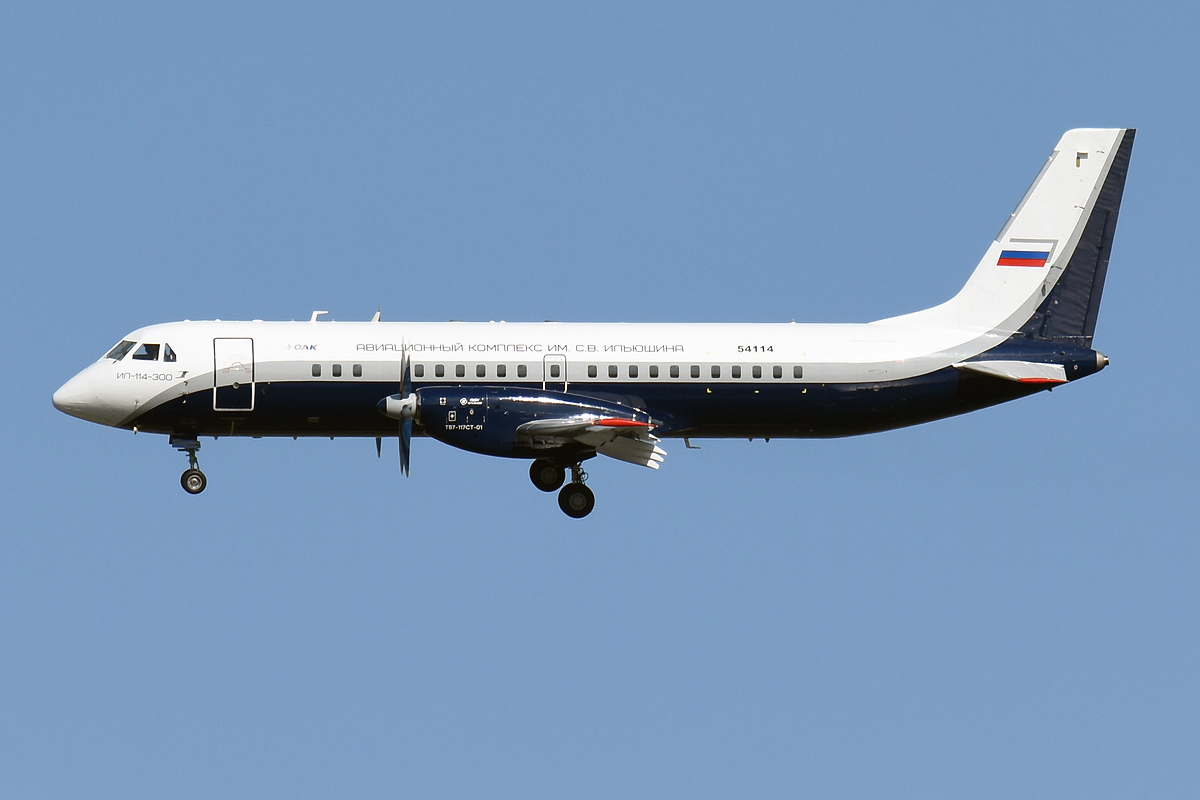
Ilyushin Il-114-300

In October 2025, Hindustan Aeronautics Limited signed a memorandum of understanding with United Aircraft Corporation to manufacture the SJ-100 under license for the Indian domestic market, as part of the Indian Regional Jet strategy. This partnership marks the first time a passenger aircraft would be produced in India since the end of licensed production of the British Avro HS748 in 1988. In December 2025, during the 23rd India – Russia summit, Sergey Chemezov, the head of Rostec, stated that Russia and India had begun discussing the joint production of the Ilyushin Il-114 with Hindustan Aeronautics Limited.

==== Engines ====
HAL MiG Engine Division Koraput

In April 1964 Hindustan Aeronautics Limited opened the MiG Engine Division Koraput complex to license manufacture the Tumansky R-11 turbojet engine for the MiG-21. The facility would further go on to manufacture the Tumansky R-25 and Tumansky R-29 for upgraded variants of the MiG-21, MiG-23 and MiG-27. MiG Koraput currently produce the Klimov RD-33 engine to support the MiG-29 in service with the Indian Air Force and Indian Navy.

HAL Sukhoi Engine Division Koraput

In 2002, Hindustan Aeronautics Limited operated the Sukhoi Engine Division Koraput complex to license produce the Saturn AL-31FP engine for the Sukhoi Su-30MKI.

==== Missiles ====
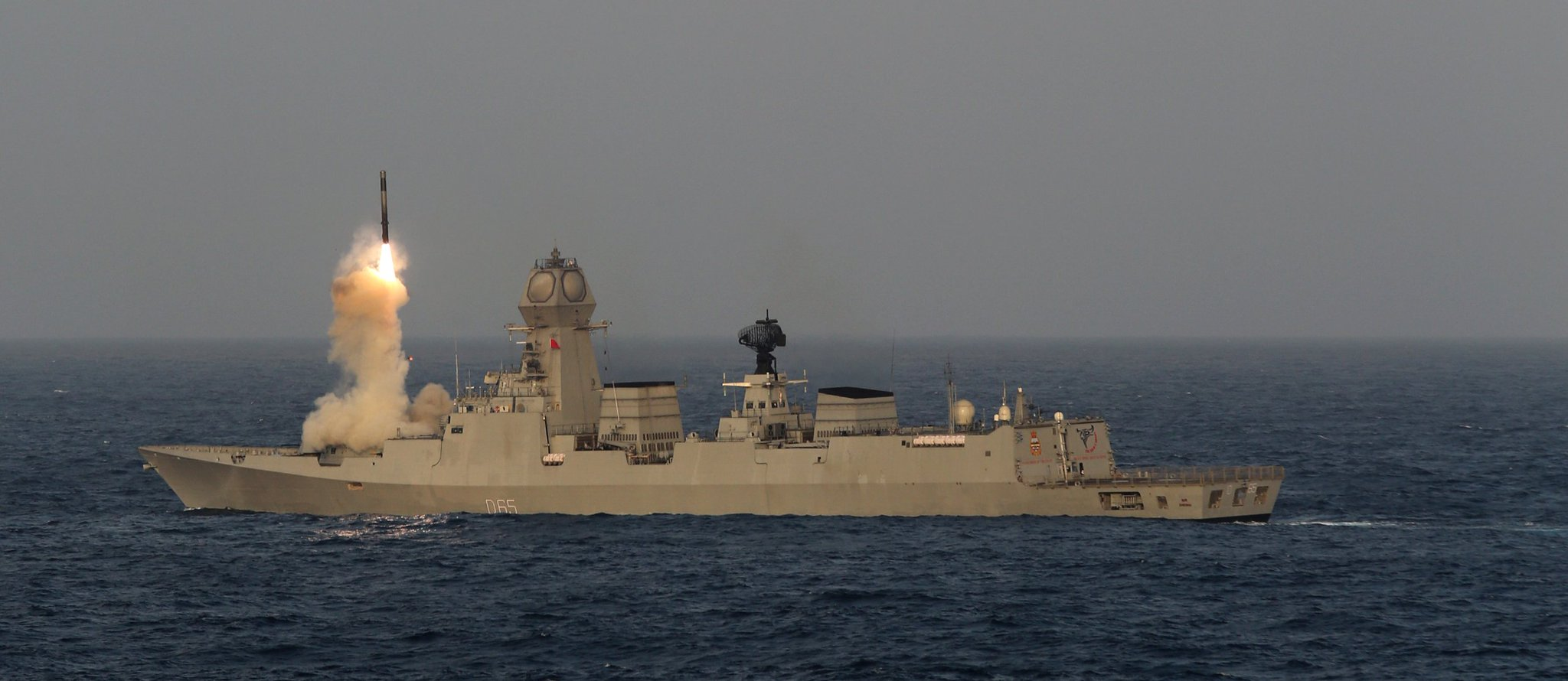
BrahMos missile fired from INS Chennai.

In 1995, BrahMos Aerospace was formed as a joint Indo-Russian venture between India's Defence Research and Development Organisation (DRDO) and NPO Mashinostroyeniya. The companies name is a portmanteau formed from the names of two rivers, the Brahmaputra of India and the Moskva of Russia. The company currently manufactures the BahMos universal missile, an advanced derivative of the P-800 Oniks. Land, ship and air based versions of the missile have been inducted across the Indian Armed Forces.

In 2022, the CEO of BrahMos Aerospace, Atul Rane, stated that a future hypersonic missile, designated as the BrahMos-II and based on the 3M22 Zircon, could be developed, named the BrahMos-II.

The missile was used during the 2025 India-Pakistan conflict as part of Operation Sindoor, hitting targets across Pakistan using missiles launched in the air from Sukhoi Su-30MKI aircraft.

=== Israel ===
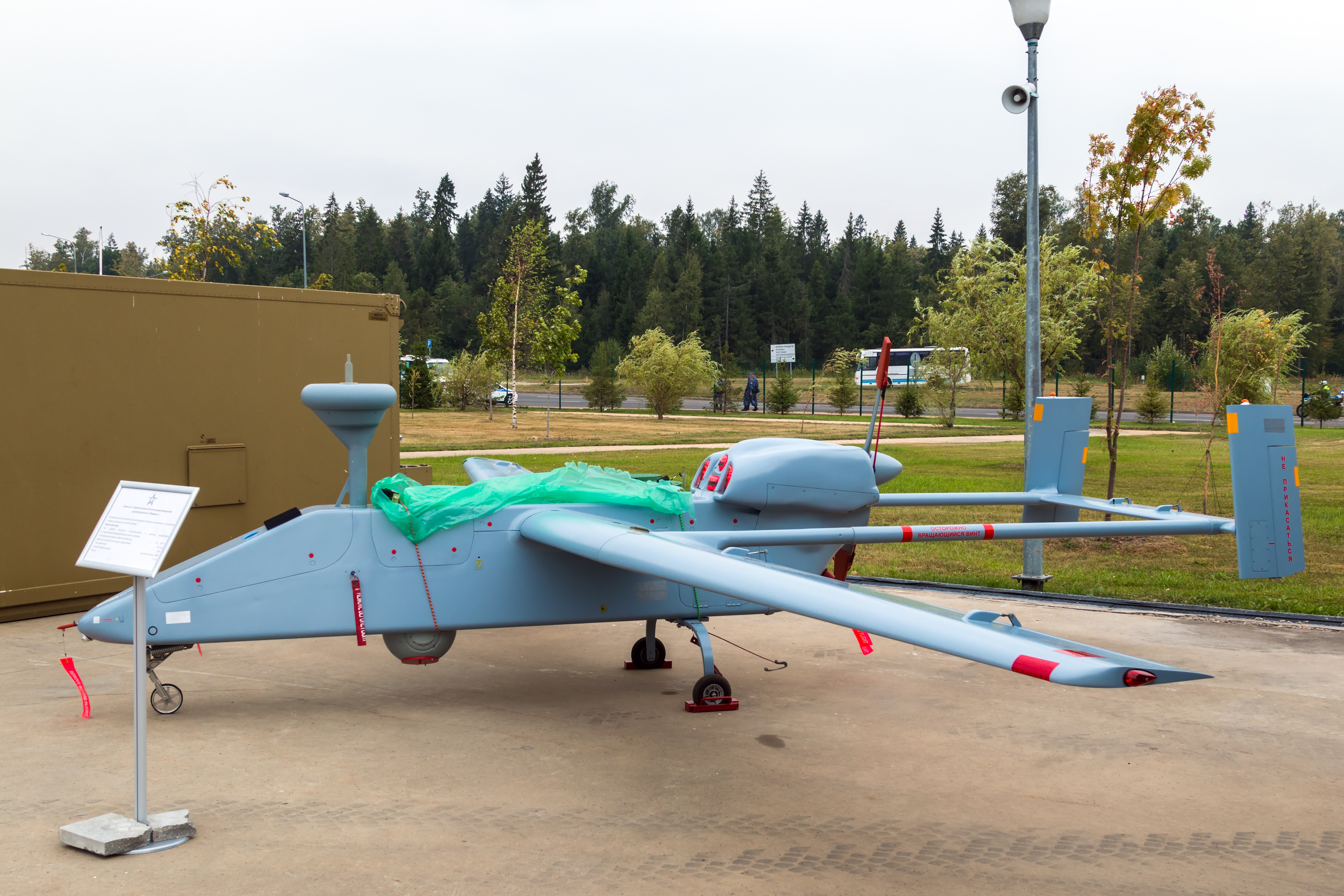
IAI UZGA Forpost

A licensed copy of the Israeli IAI Searcher UAV is produced by UZGA. A fully domestic version Forpost-R made its first flight in 2019, with production continuing as of 2025 in both reconnaissance and strike configurations. The domestic variant of the drone replaces its engine and electronic components with those of Russian manufacture.

In 2009, Israel and Russia signed a contract to supply a batch of IAI Bird-Eye reconnaissance drones to the Russian Ground Forces, following a Russian evaluation of combat performance during the Russo-Georgian War. In December 2009 media reports suggested that Russia is negotiating a second purchase of drones. In October 2010, Israel Aerospace Industries announced that it signed a $400 million agreement to sell unmanned aerial vehicles components for a production line of UAVs to be assembled in Russia. In Russian service, the drones were given the designation Zastava. A small number of IAI I-View drones were also purchased.

=== Ukraine ===
==== Civil aircraft ====
Ukraine inherited a significant portion of the Soviet aviation industry, including the Antonov and Ivchenko-Progress design bureaus, as well as several manufacturing and maintenance facilities. These facilities were closely associated and reliant on partnerships with the industries of Russia, particularly in regards to aircraft design, avionics and flight testing. From Ukrainian Independence until the geopolitical turmoil as a result of the Euromaidan, the joint production of aircraft was relatively successful. The aircraft on offer were primarily aimed at serving the countries of the CIS, or other friendly countries such as Cuba, Iran and North Korea, which have limited access to western-built aircraft.

Following the deterioration of relations between the two countries, production of these aircraft have largely halted. Russia has chosen to focus on more modern aircraft such as the SJ-100 and MC-21 with a focus on import substitution. Ukrainian civil aircraft production has largely collapsed in the years following, despite attempting to court potential investors from China and Saudi Arabia, struggling to compete with industrial giants such as Airbus, Boeing or Embraer

Former Joint Russia-Ukraine Aircraft Projects

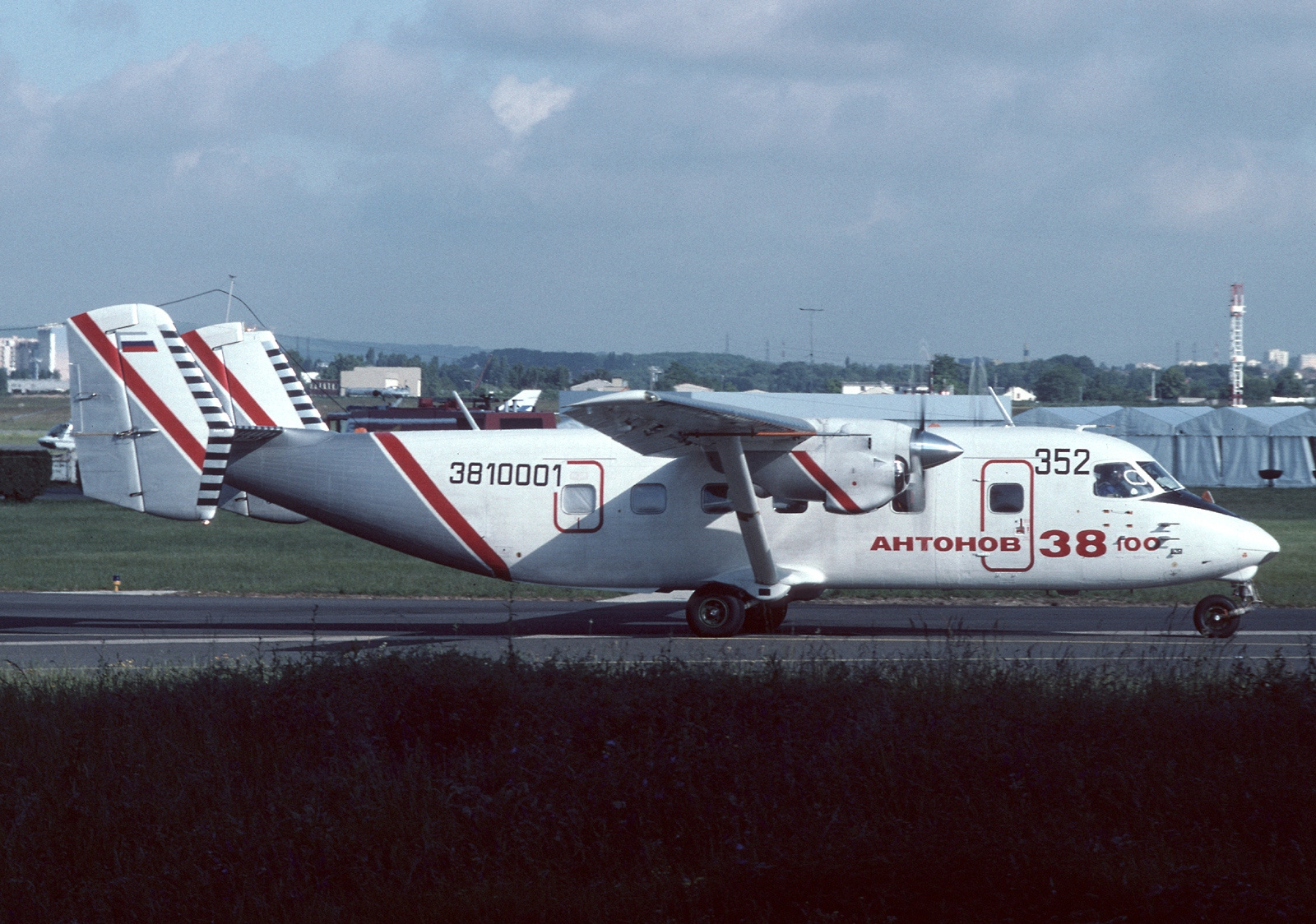
Antonov An-38

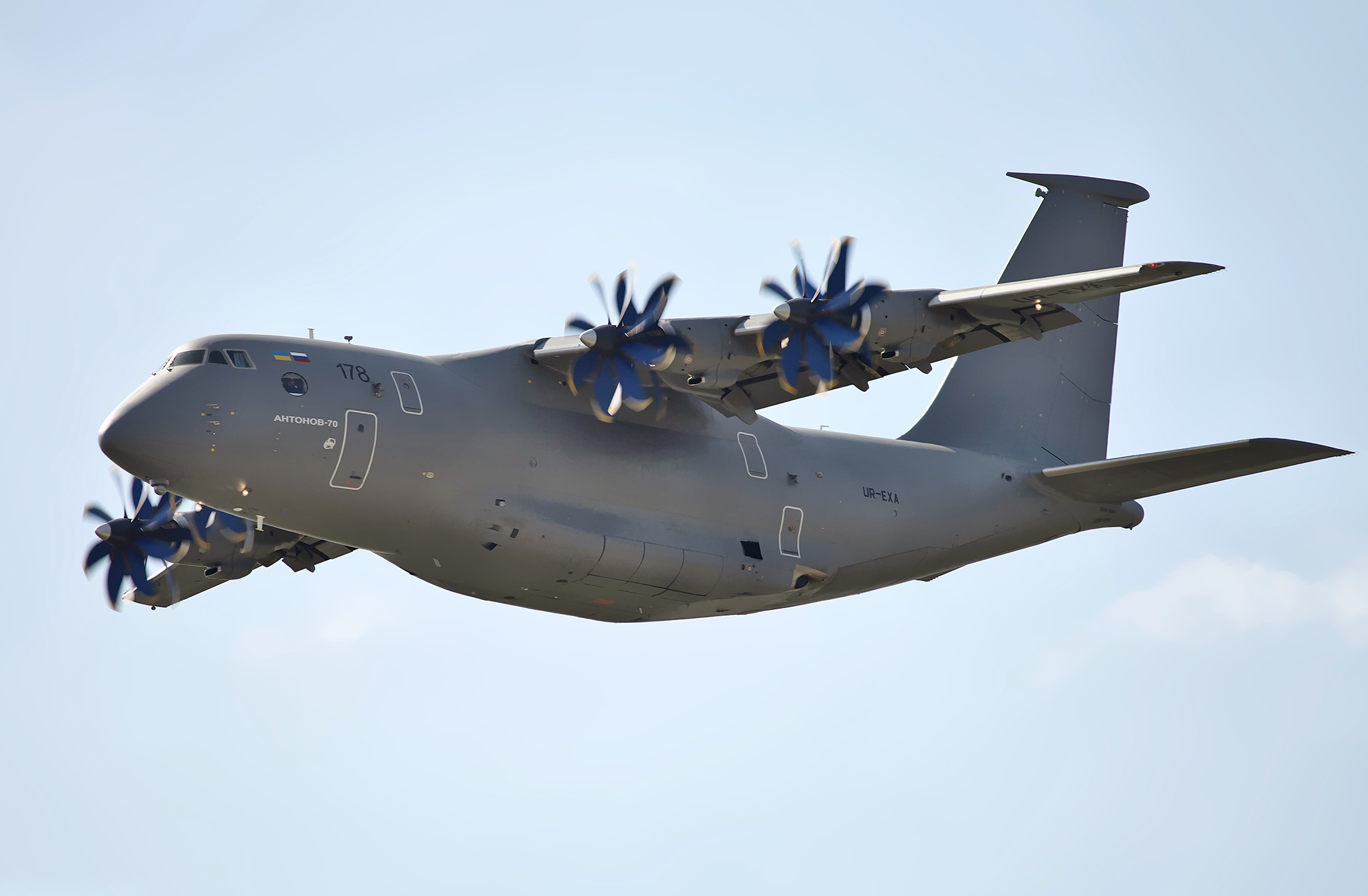
Antonov An-70

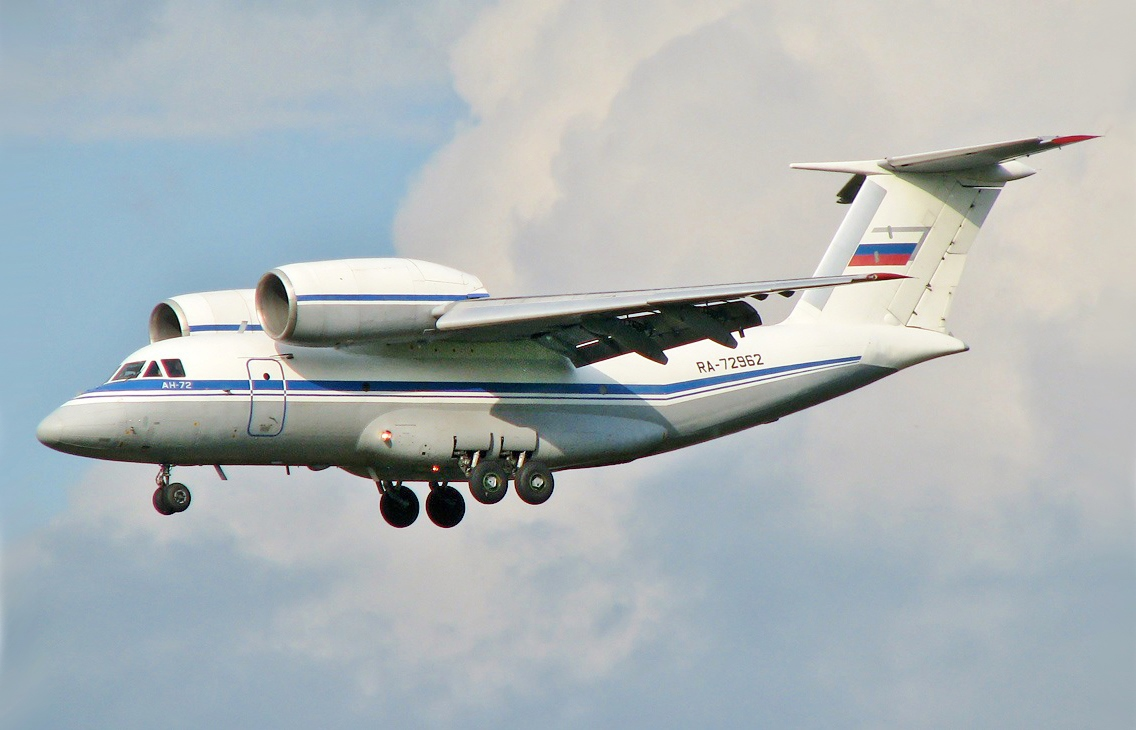
Antonov An-72

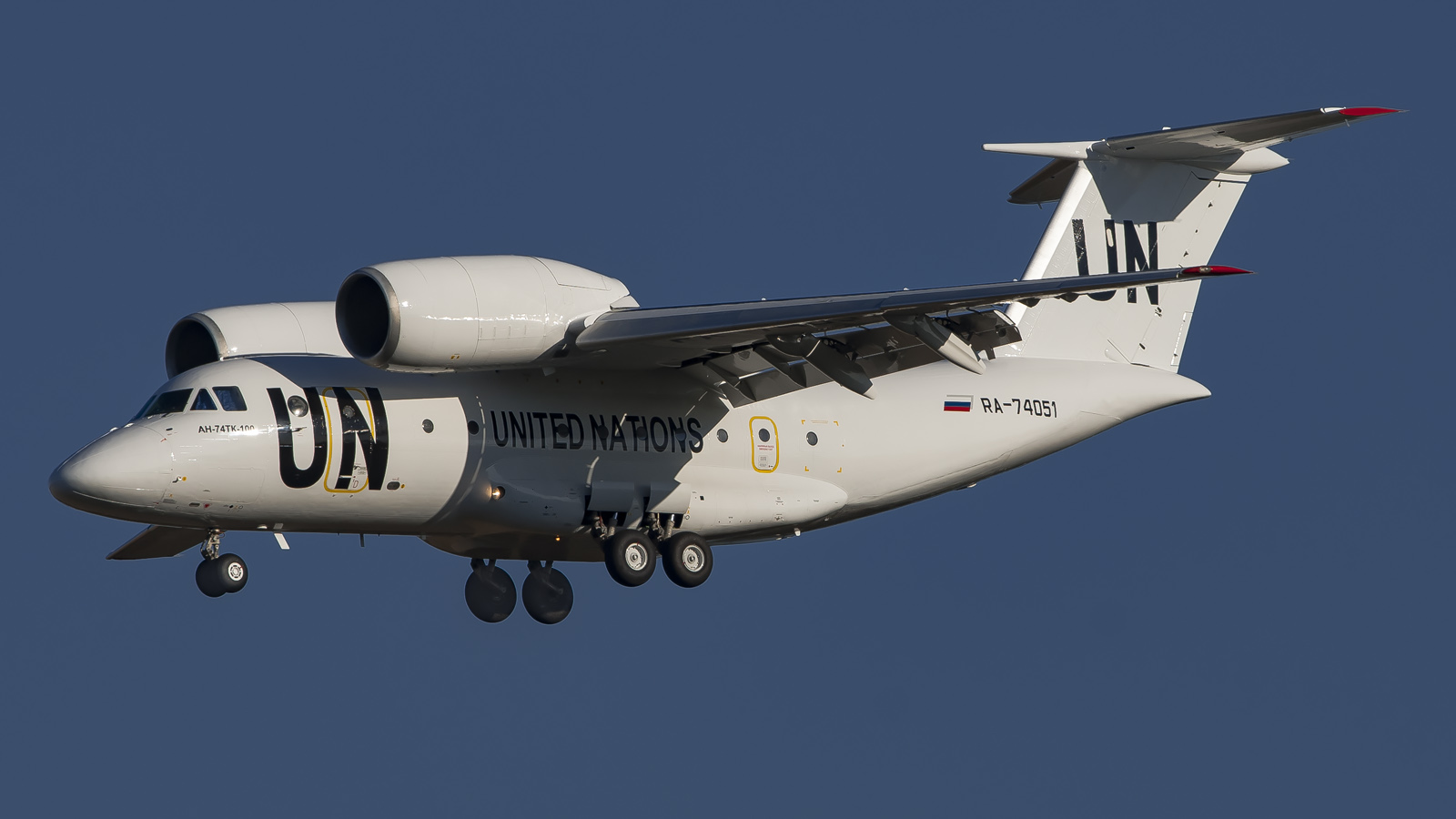
Antonov An-74

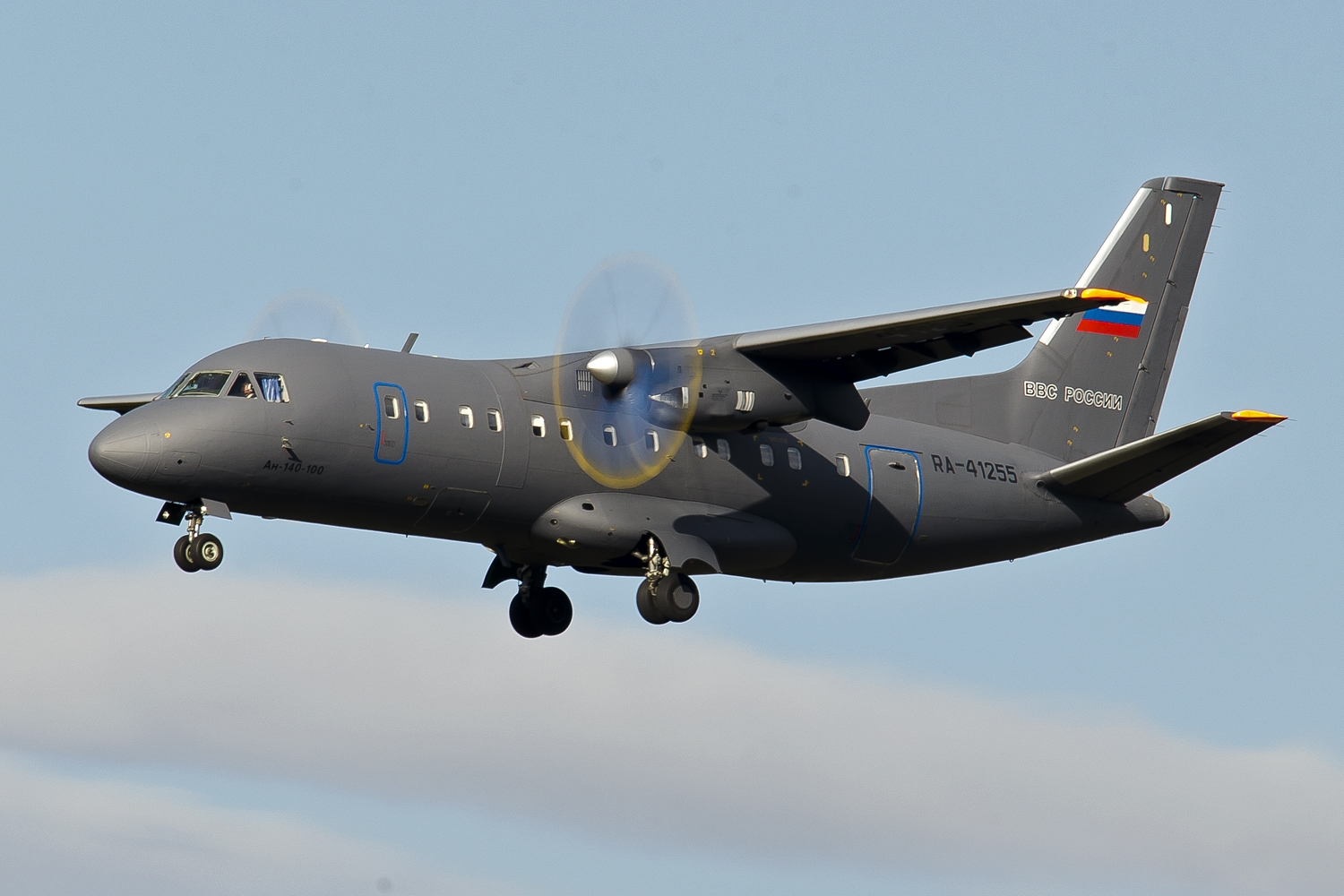
Antonov An-140

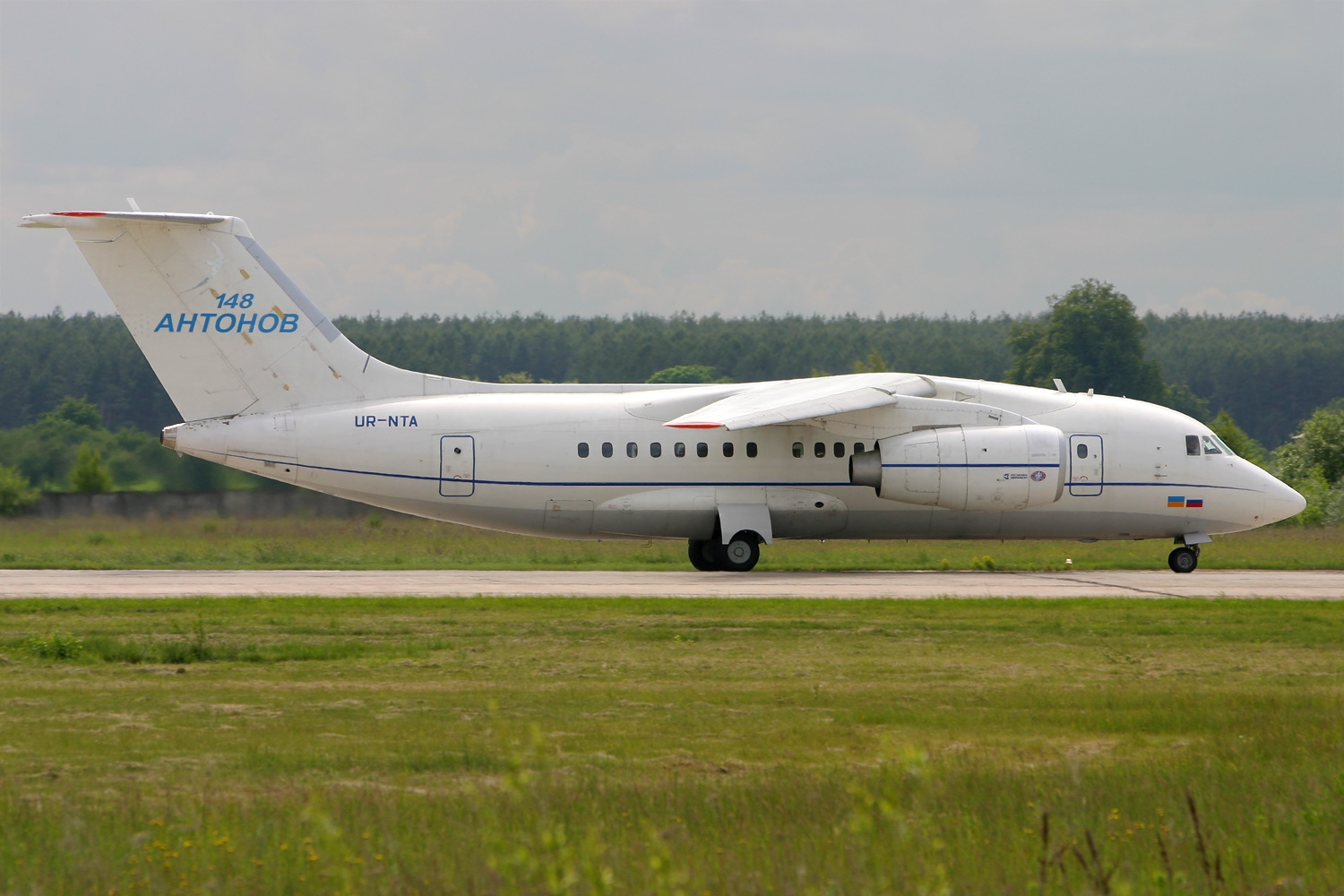
Antonov An-148

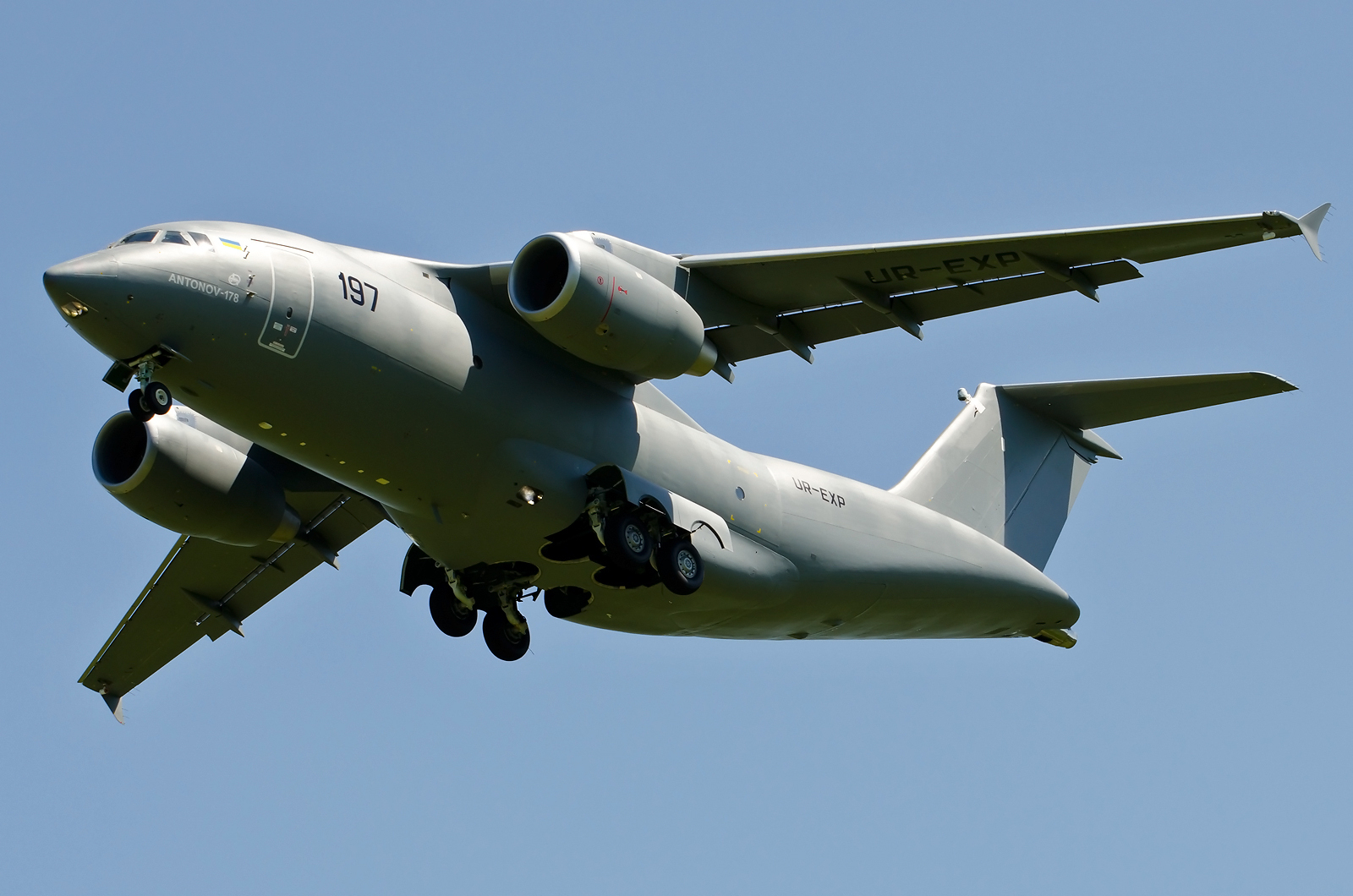
Antonov An-178

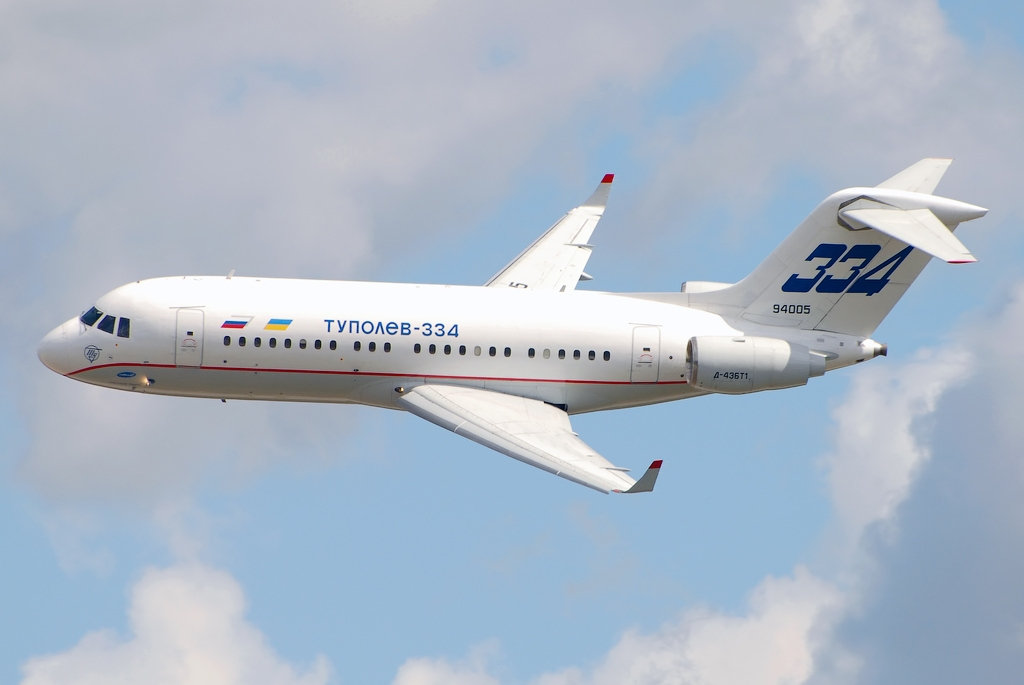
Tupolev Tu-334

==== Engines ====
Ukrainian or joint built engines were formerly used in a number of Russian and joint Russo-Ukrainian built aircraft.

== Economic significance ==
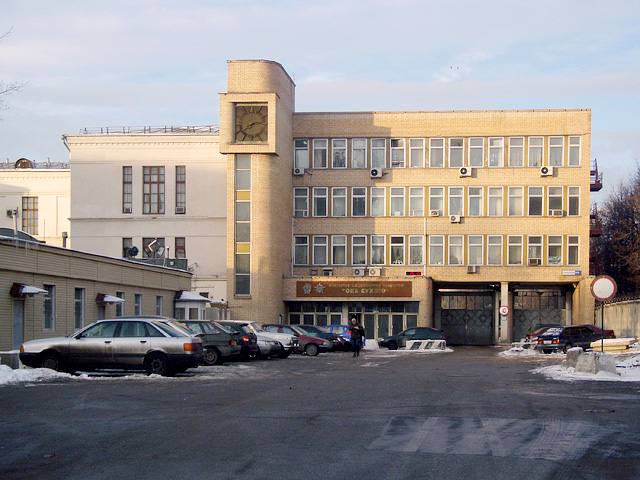
Offices of Sukhoi Design Bureau

Russia's aircraft industry is one of the backbone branches of the country's economy. It is one of the most science-intensive hi-tech sectors and employs the largest number of skilled personnel. The production and value of the military aircraft branch far outstrips other defense industry sectors, and aircraft products make up more than half of the country's arms exports.

=== Employment ===
In 2008, the number of personnel estimated to be working for the aircraft industry was 355,300. The United Aircraft Corporation holding, which encompasses most of the industry's key companies, had 97,500 employees in 2009. Of this amount, 85,500 worked in production at factories, 11,100 worked in the design bureaus and 900 in management and leasing companies. The average age of UAC personnel working in production was 44 years, and 49 for the personnel working in the design bureaus. The ratio of higher education graduates was 34%.

== See also ==
- Glossary of Russian and USSR aviation acronyms
- List of Russian aerospace engineers
- Space industry of Russia
