= Raj Hamsa X-Air "H" Hanuman =

Indian ultralight aircraft

X-Air Hanuman
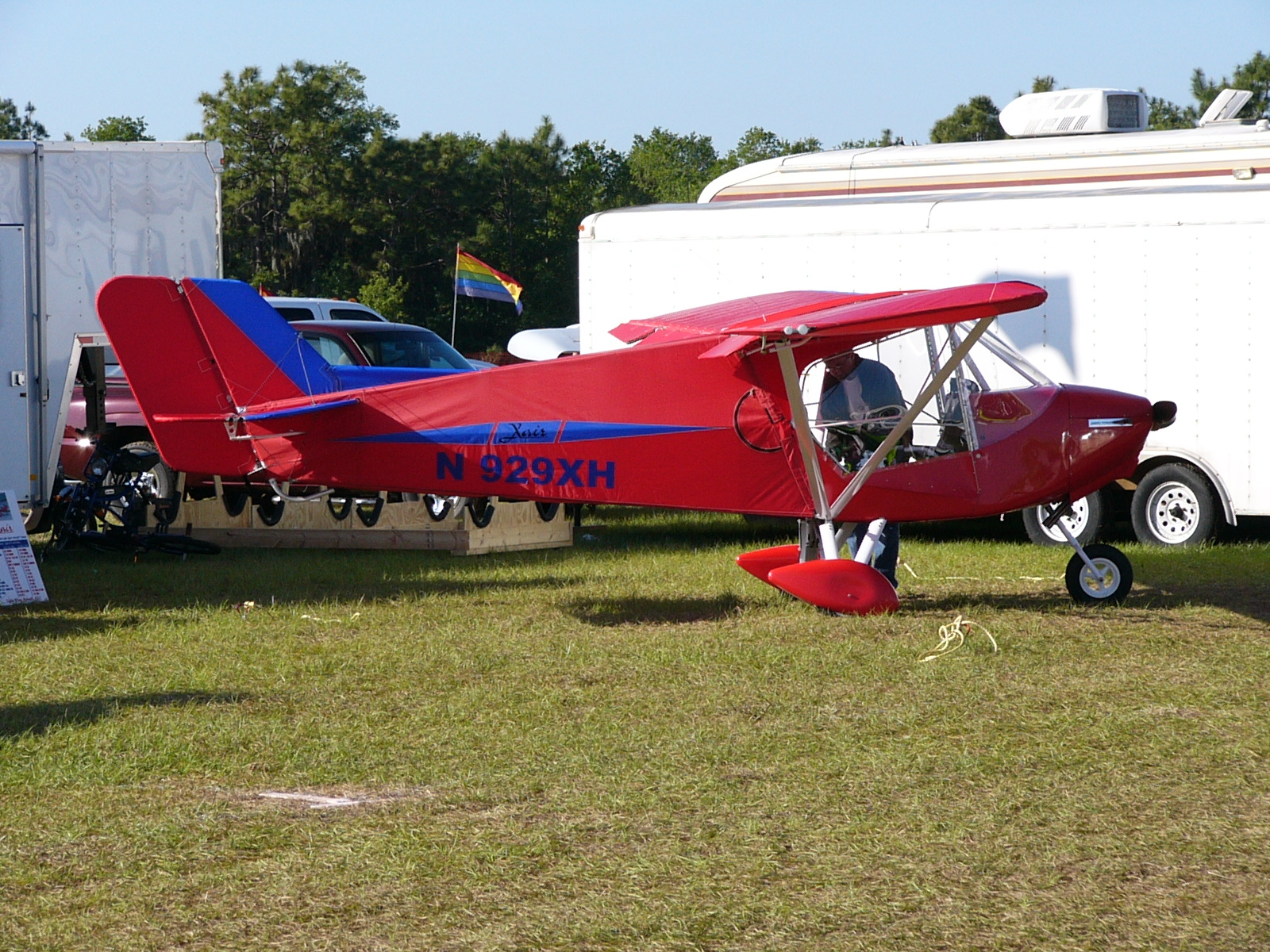

General information
- Type: Fixed wing ultralight aircraft
- National origin: India
- Manufacturer: Raj Hamsa Ultralights
- Designer: Joel Koechlin
- Status: Active
- Number built: 216 (Dec 2011)

History
- Developed from: X-AIR 'F' Gumnam

The X-Air Hanuman (English: Hawk) is a two-seat, fixed tricycle gear, general aviation ultralight airplane, manufactured in India by Raj Hamsa Ultralights. It is used primarily for flight training, touring, and personal flying. The aircraft is known in North America as the X-Air "H".

== Design and development ==
The X-Air Hanuman is a single-engined high-wing monoplane with side-by-side seats for the pilot and a passenger. The aircraft is manufactured with an 85 hp (63 kW) four-cylinder four-stroke 2.2 litre Jabiru 2200 engine, which can be run on automotive fuel. The 64 hp (48 kW) Rotax 582 two-stroke, the 80 hp (60 kW) Rotax 912UL are also options.

The airframe is assembled from aluminum tubing, with steel reinforcement and is covered in Dacron sailcloth. More recent models feature composite winglets and doors.

The Hanuman offers full dual controls, with the exception of the main pilot seat having brakes and flap controls. Instrumentation consists of a tachometer, airspeed indicator, altimeter, slip indicator, battery charge indicator & coolant temperature or CHT, GPS etc.

The design is a Federal Aviation Administration approved special light-sport aircraft under the designation X-Air XA85.

== Variants ==
X-AIR "H" Hanuman
Base model
X-Air LS XA-85
Version for the US Light-sport aircraft market with an empty weight of 660 lb (299 kg) and a gross weight of 1,234 lb (560 kg)
X-AIR Hawk
Version for the United Kingdom, certified as a microlight under Civil Aviation Authority BCAR Section S and provided in kit form.

== Military operators ==
India

- Indian Military Academy - Basic flight training
- Military Headquarters Of War

== Specifications (Hanuman) ==
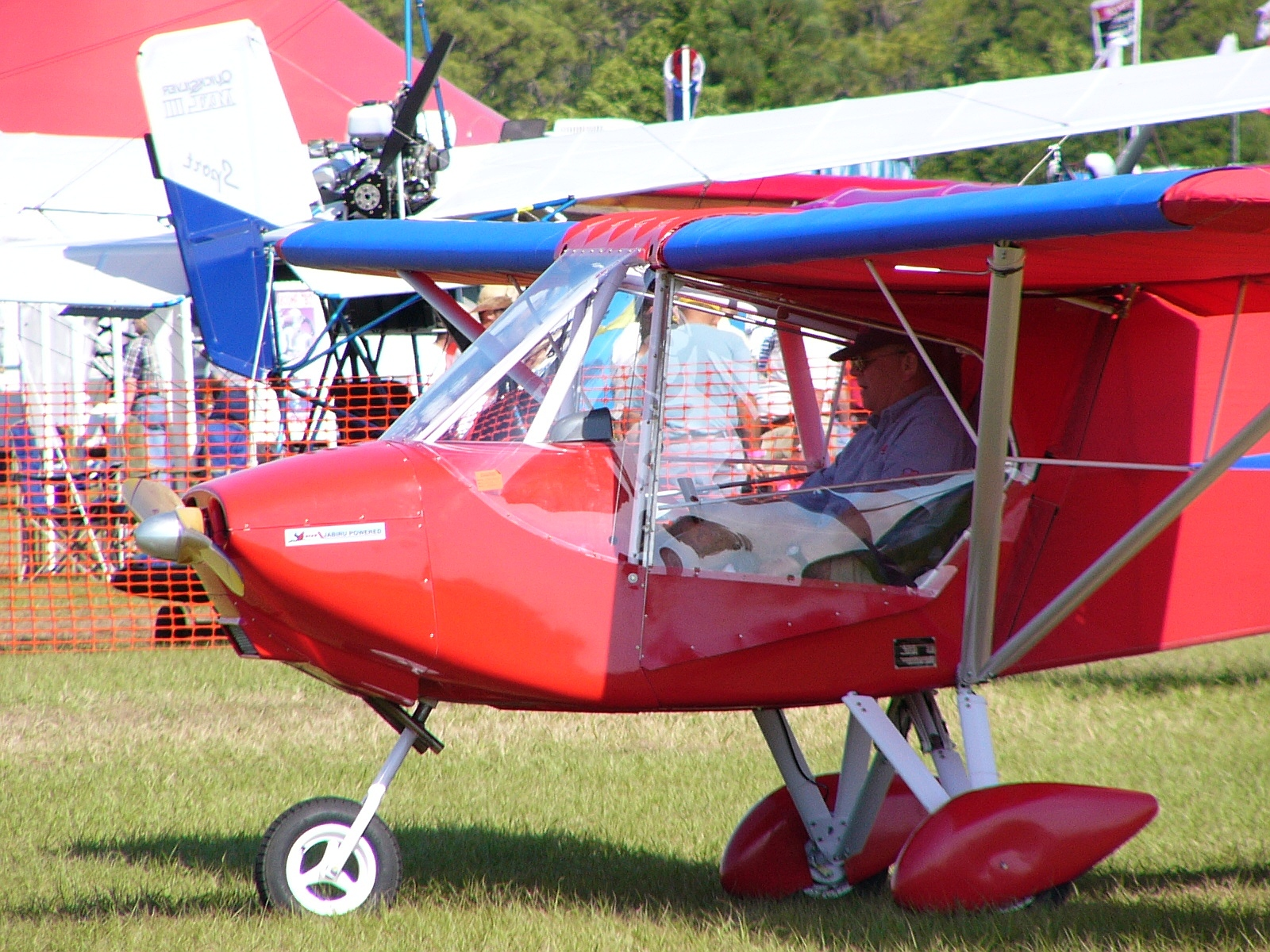
Raj Hamsa Ultralights XAIR-H Hanuman

Data from Raj Hamsa

General characteristics

- Crew: one
- Capacity: one passenger
- Length: 6.03 m (19 ft 9 in)
- Wingspan: 10.05 m (33 ft 0 in)
- Height: 2.30 m (7 ft 7 in)
- Empty weight: 268 kg (591 lb)
- Fuel capacity: 80 litres (18 imp gal; 21 US gal)
- Powerplant: 1 × Jabiru 2200 , 63 kW (85 hp)
- Propellers: 2-bladed ground adjustable

Performance

- Maximum speed: 170 km/h (110 mph, 92 kn)
- Cruise speed: 140 km/h (87 mph, 76 kn)
- Stall speed: 45 km/h (28 mph, 24 kn) flaps down
- Minimum control speed: 50 km/h (31 mph, 27 kn) flaps down
- Range: 800 km (500 mi, 430 nmi)
- Service ceiling: 3,700 m (12,000 ft)
- g limits: +6/-3
- Maximum glide ratio: 10:1
- Rate of climb: 4.5 m/s (890 ft/min)

== See also ==
=== Comparable aircraft ===
- Best Off Skyranger
- ICP Savannah
- Ikarus C42
- Zenith CH-701
