= Raj Hamsa Ultralights =

Indian aircraft manufacturer

- Company type: Limited Company
- Industry: Aerospace
- Founded: Pondicherry, India (1980)
- Founder: Joel Koechlin
- Headquarters: Bangalore, India
- Number of locations: Pondicherry, India
- Products: Ultralight aircraft
- Number of employees: 30-35
- Parent: Koechlin family
- Website: www.x-air.in

Raj Hamsa Ultralights is an Indian private limited company and ultralight aircraft manufacturer, founded in 1980 at Pondicherry, India by Joel Koechlin (of the Koechlin family) of France. The company is one of India's largest aircraft manufacturers and is the only producer of commercial microlight aircraft. It started in 1980 producing hang gliders, introduced powered hang gliders in 1983 and the X-Air line of microlights in 1993. By 2007, the company had produced over 1,000 aircraft.

The company's headquarters and sole manufacturing facility is located at Bangalore, India. The company employs 30-35 people and produces about 100 aircraft kits annually.

The company's X-Air 'S' and 'F' models have been successful in the market and are exported widely. The new Hawk model, known as Hanuman in India, is currently awaiting Indian and UK certification. The ultralights manufactured by Raj Hamsa are some of the least expensive available in India and many parts of the world.

The company is a factory agent for Jabiru Aircraft engines.

== Aircraft ==
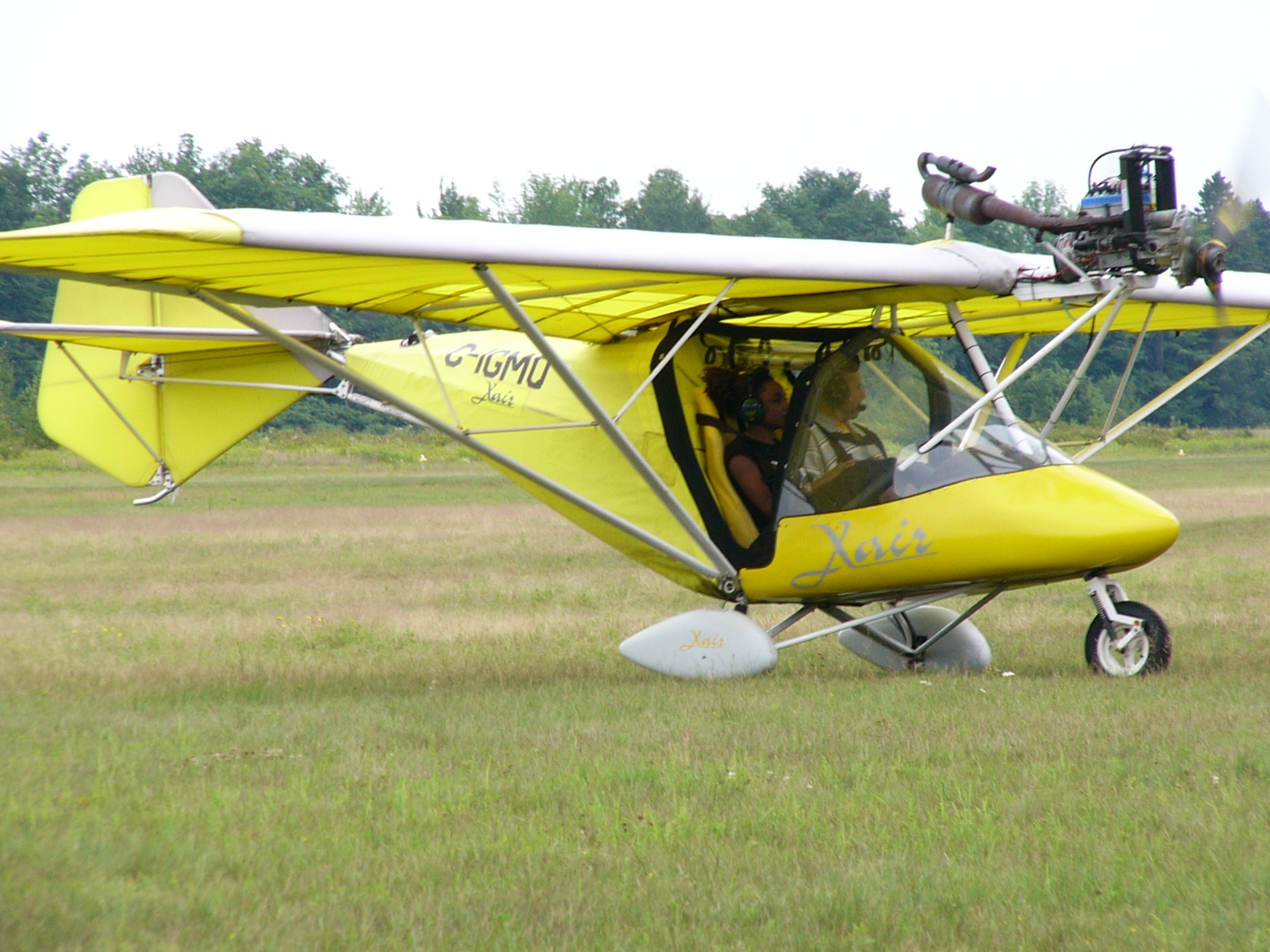
X-Air 602T

X-Air
The X-Air was the first aircraft produced by the company. A total of 1300 X-Air F and S have been exported by the company. Standard equipment is a Rotax 582 and basic instruments. Its high-mounted engine is sited just ahead of the wing, and is supported by struts that pass down through the cockpit.The XAir is certified to UK BCAR Section "S".

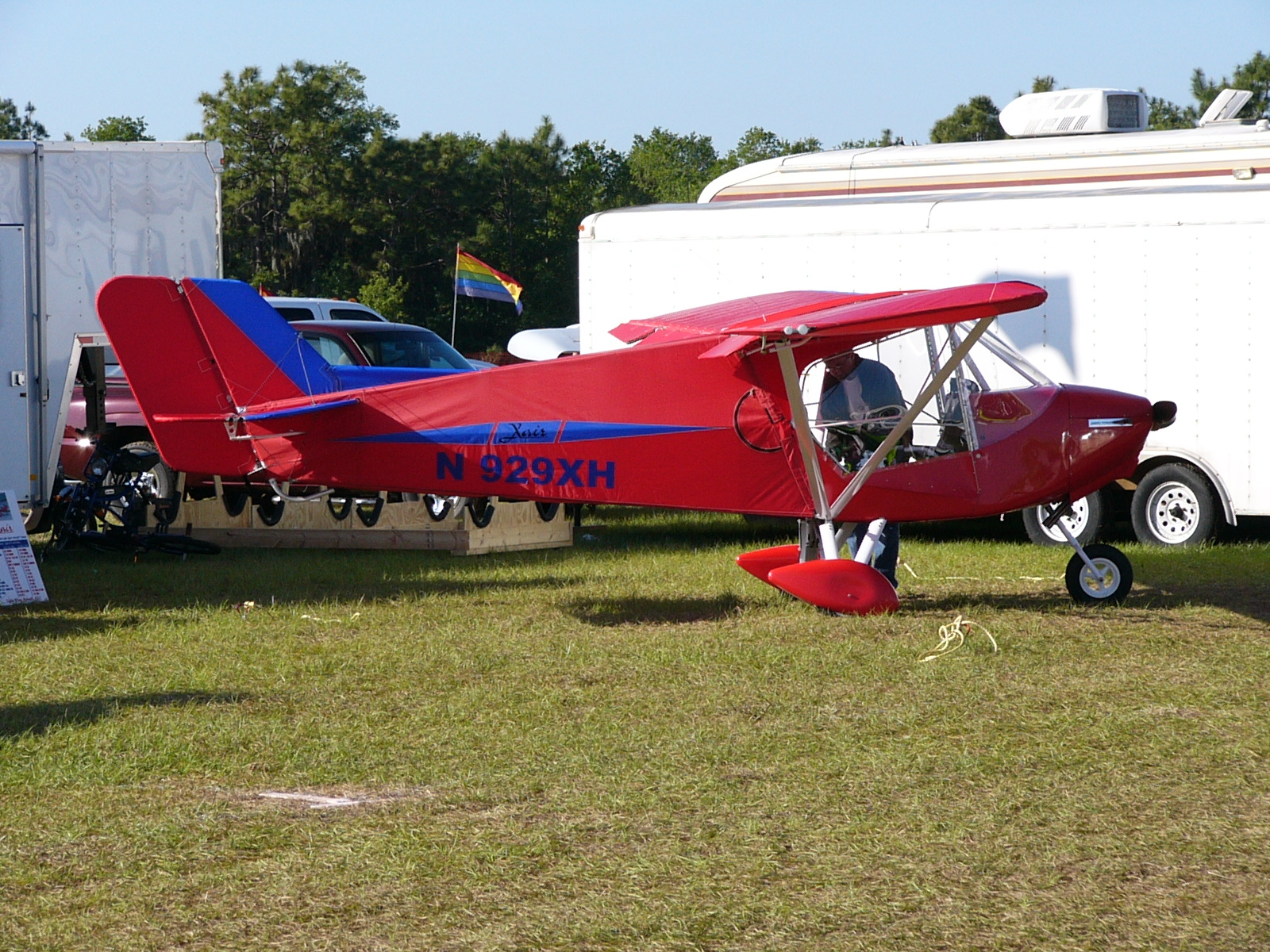
X-Air Hanuman

X-Air Hanuman
This model is based upon the X-Air "F" Gumnam, with a more conventional nose-mounted engine configuration. Designed for leisure flying and flight training the Jabiru 2200 and Rotax 582 engines are optional. This aircraft is . The aircraft is known in North America as the X-AIR "H"

Voyager
A two-seat cross-country capable ultralight trike powered by a Rotax 503 or Jabiru 2200.

Clipper
A two-seat ultralight trike powered by a Rotax 503 engine designed for training and recreational flying.

== Certification ==
The X-Air and Hanuman are both accepted by Transport Canada as Advanced Ultra-light Aeroplanes in Canada.

The Hanuman is an approved US Federal Aviation Administration Light sport aircraft as the model X-Air XA85.
