= Thruster Air Services =

British homebuilt aircraft manufacturer

- Company type: Privately held company
- Industry: Aerospace
- Founded: mid-1980s
- Defunct: 2021
- Headquarters: Langworth, Lincolnshire, United Kingdom
- Products: Kit aircraft
- Owner: Stephen Turley and Gerald Cooper
- Website: www.thruster.co.uk

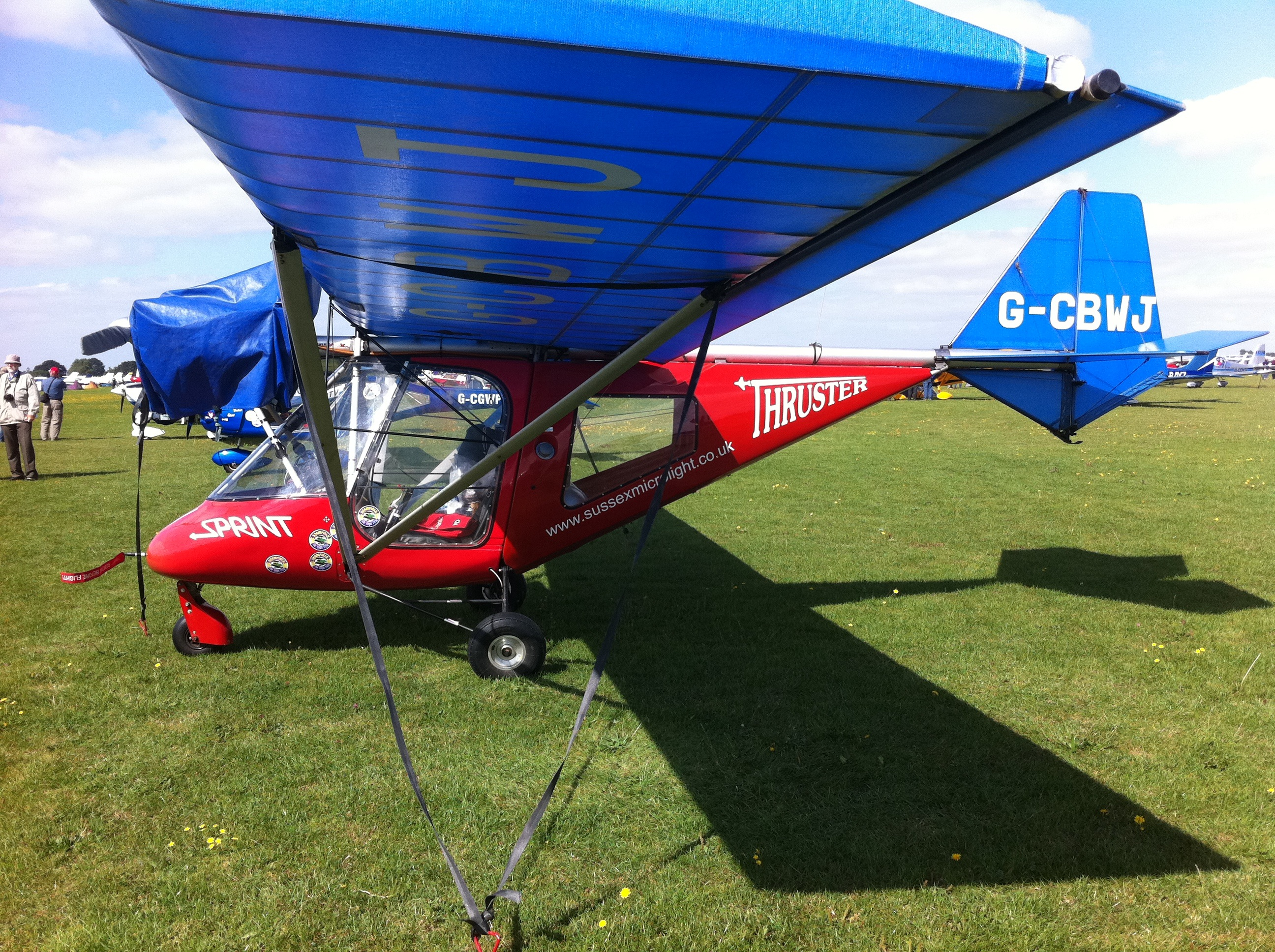
Thruster T600N 450 Sprint

Thruster Air Services was a British aircraft manufacturer based in Langworth, Lincolnshire. The company specialized in the design and manufacture of ultralight aircraft in the form of ready-to-fly aircraft for the Fédération Aéronautique Internationale microlight category.

== History ==
The company was formed in Camelford, Cornwall, in the mid-1980s to produce the Thruster TST and the Thruster T300. By the mid-1990s the company was producing the T600 and it continued to be developed over time. In the winter of 2006 the company was sold to Stephen Turley and Gerald Cooper and in the summer of 2007 was moved to Wickenby Aerodrome in Lincolnshire.

As of July 2021 the company is listed as "dormant", the company website domain is for sale and no information is readily available for the status of this company.

== Aircraft ==
Summary of aircraft built by Thruster Air Services
Model name	First flight	Number built	Type
Thruster T600 Sprint	mid-1990s		Two-seat microlight aircraft
Thruster T300	mid-1980s		Two-seat microlight aircraft
Thruster TST	mid-1980s		Microlight aircraft
