= Protoplane Ultra =

French ultralight aircraft

Ultra
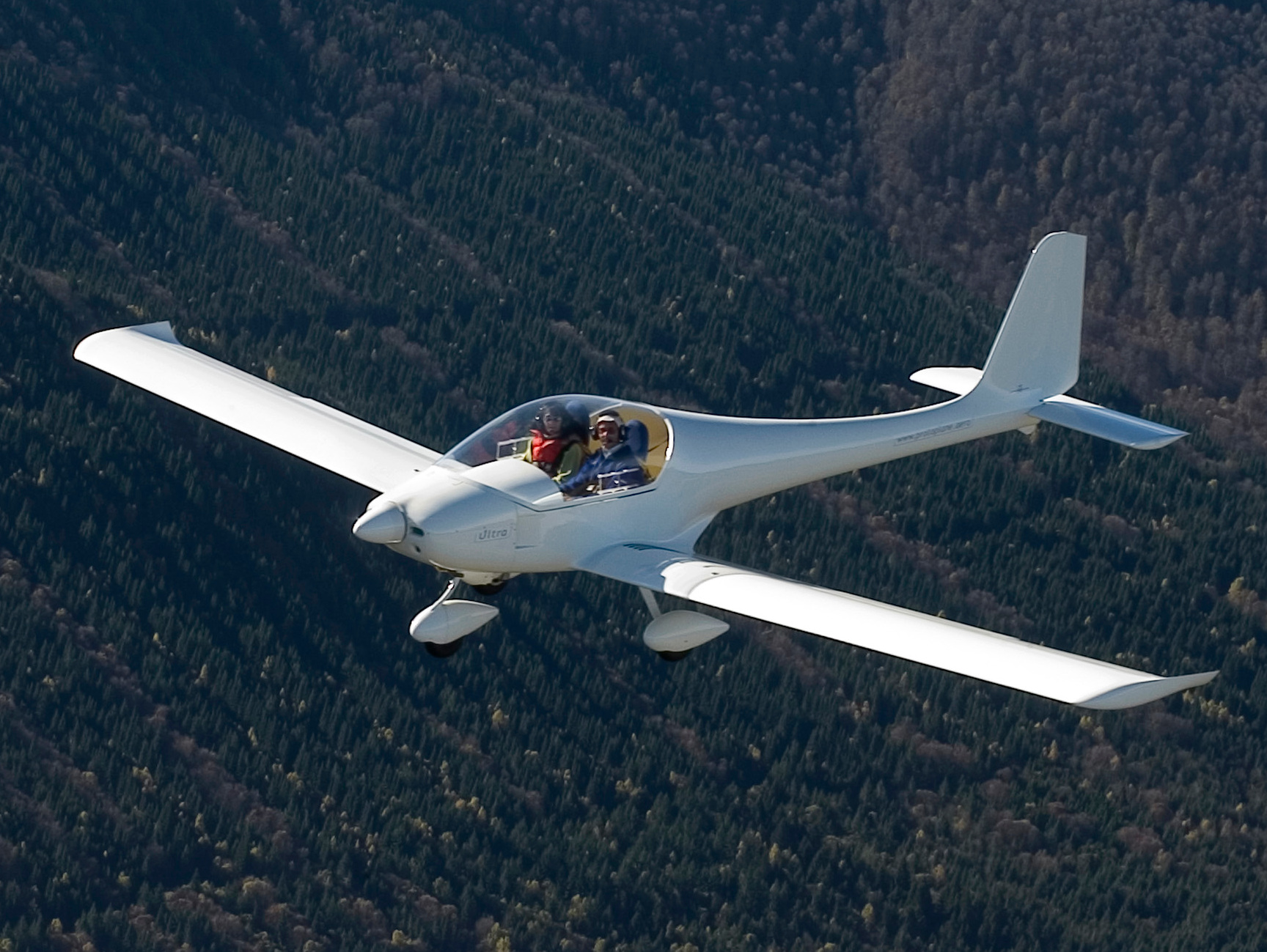

General information
- Type: Ultralight aircraft
- National origin: France
- Manufacturer: Protoplane
- Status: In production (2012)

The Protoplane Ultra is a French ultralight aircraft, designed and produced by Protoplane of Bagnères-de-Bigorre. The aircraft is supplied as a complete ready-to-fly aircraft.

== Design and development ==
The Ultra was designed as a highly efficient aircraft, to comply with the Fédération Aéronautique Internationale microlight rules. It features a cantilever low-wing, a two-seats-in-side-by-side configuration enclosed cockpit under a bubble canopy, fixed tricycle landing gear with wheel pants and a single engine in tractor configuration.

The aircraft is made from composites. Its 11 m (36.1 ft) span wing employs a Wortmann FX 66-17All-182/26 airfoil, has an area of 12.10 m^{2} (130.2 sq ft) and flaps that have deflections of 0°, 15° and 35° available. The standard engine provided is the 85 hp (63 kW) Jabiru 2200 four-stroke powerplant.

The Ultra achieves a fuel economy of 12L/h (43 mpg) at 220 km/h (137 mph) through aerodynamic refinements and use of composites.

== Variants ==
Ultra
Petrol-powered version equipped with an 85 hp (63 kW) Jabiru 2200 four-stroke powerplant
Ultra-e
Electric aircraft variant under development.

== Specifications (Ultra) ==
Data from Bayerl and Protoplane

General characteristics

- Crew: one
- Capacity: one passenger
- Length: 7.24 m (23 ft 9 in)
- Wingspan: 11.00 m (36 ft 1 in)
- Height: 1.43 m (4 ft 8 in)
- Wing area: 12.10 m^{2} (130.2 sq ft)
- Airfoil: Wortmann FX 66-17All-182/26
- Empty weight: 250 kg (551 lb)
- Gross weight: 450 kg (992 lb)
- Fuel capacity: 90 litres (20 imp gal; 24 US gal)
- Powerplant: 1 × Jabiru 2200A four cylinder, air-cooled, four stroke aircraft engine, 63 kW (85 hp)
- Propellers: 2-bladed Arplast Helice TD 152 composite propeller

Performance

- Maximum speed: 255 km/h (158 mph, 138 kn)
- Cruise speed: 220 km/h (140 mph, 120 kn)
- Stall speed: 59 km/h (37 mph, 32 kn)
- Never exceed speed: 272 km/h (169 mph, 147 kn)
- g limits: +5.30/-2.65
- Maximum glide ratio: 22:1 at 92 km/h (57 mph)
- Rate of climb: 8 m/s (1,600 ft/min)
- Rate of sink: 1.11 m/s (219 ft/min)
- Wing loading: 37.2 kg/m^{2} (7.6 lb/sq ft)
