= Ameur Altania =

Altania
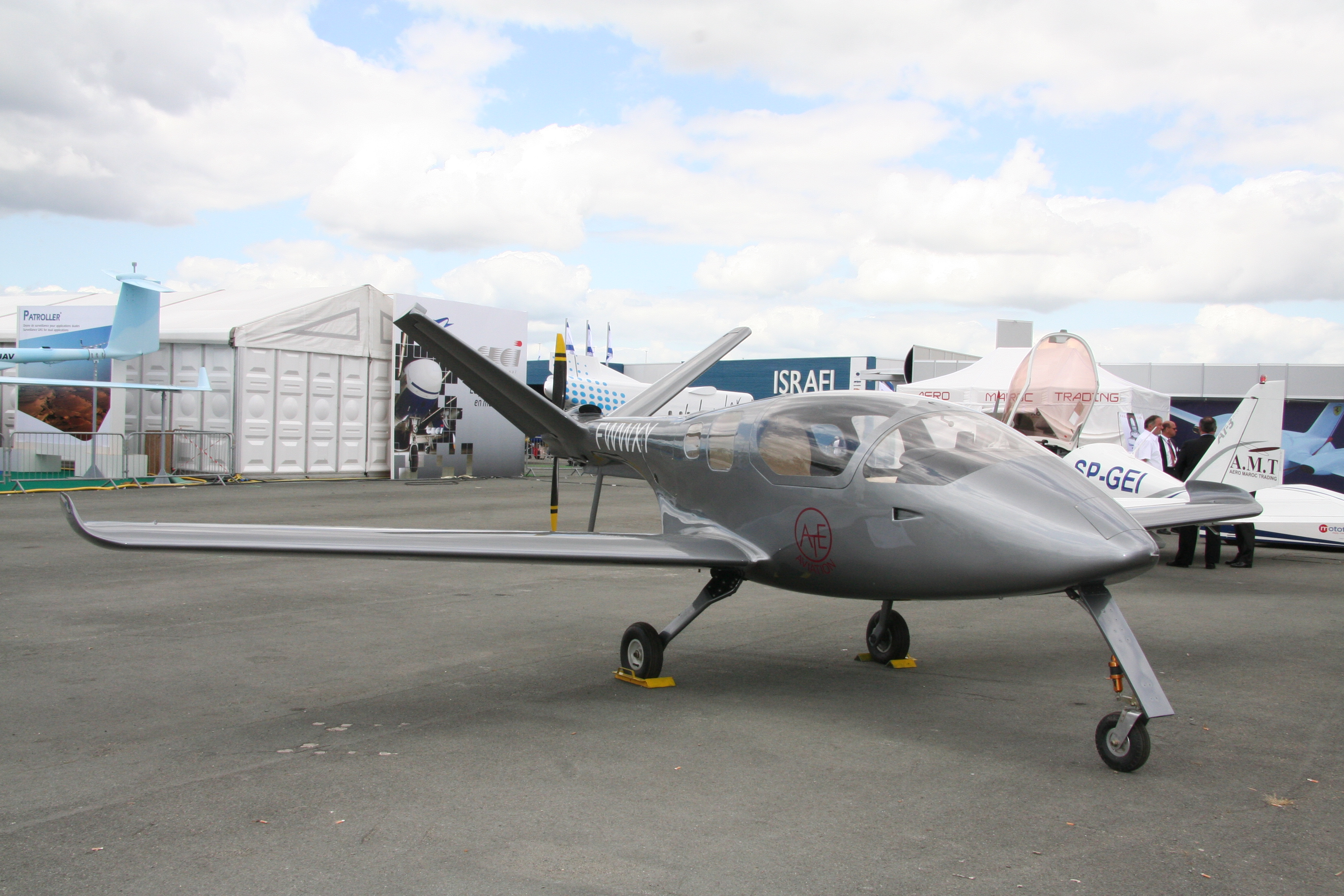
- Universal Composite Aviation Carbon Bird CB-200

General information
- Type: Two/four seat ultralight
- National origin: France
- Manufacturer: Ameur Aviation SA (Ameur Aviation Technologie until 2001)
- Designer: Boussad Ameur
- Number built: c.5

History
- First flight: 9 July 1995

The Ameur Altania was a single-engine light aircraft of pusher configuration with side-by-side seats for two and a V-tail, designed in France in the 1990s. Several prototypes were built and flown, including a 15 m span motorglider version; the final prototype was constructed from carbon composites rather than glass fibre. Another version, the UCA Carbon Bird has been built by Universal Composite Aviation after the bankruptcy of Ameur Aviation.

== Design and development ==
The Altania was designed by the Corsica-based Ameur Aviation Technologie group (AAT) as the AAT Balbuzard (Osprey in English). It was a low-wing monoplane of pusher configuration, with a single buried engine driving a propeller at the extreme rear via a long driveshaft. The engine was mounted over the wing with a dorsal shallow air intake just behind the cabin. Behind the engine the fuselage became a slender boom, terminating in a butterfly tail and two ventral strakes. The cabin seated two side by side, with a small luggage space behind, and was enclosed by a forward-hinged, single piece canopy. There was a retractable tricycle undercarriage with inward retracting mainwheels, fitted with hydraulic brakes.

=== Five prototypes ===
The first prototype Balbuzard flew on 9 July 1995, powered by a 60 kW (80 hp) Rotax 912. Like the next three prototypes, this aircraft had a glass fibre structure.
The second prototype had an 88 kW (118 hp) Textron Lycoming O-235 engine, driving a three-blade, fixed pitch propeller, and a longer span and lower set wing fitted with winglets. The undercarriage height was also increased. This second prototype F-W(P)ARA was lost in 1997 when the propeller driveshaft failed in flight;
The third prototype, similarly powered, was renamed the Baljims 1A because of copyright issues. Between them, the second and third prototypes achieved 350 hours of flight testing.
The fourth prototype was a long span (15 m or 49 ft 2.5 in) motorglider, only flown for 30 hours before its development was abandoned.
The fifth aircraft, the Ameur Altania prototype, was built from pre-impregnated carbon-epoxy and honeycomb, because glass fibre construction of these prototypes led to excess weight. The fuselage was single piece and the single spar wing had double-slotted flaps and upturned tips. It flew in December 2001. This fifth prototype aircraft/first Altania F-WWMU is recorded as damaged in July 2005, with no mention of repair.

=== Projects ===
Several production variants were projected: The Altania RG 80 UL; the Altania Vista surveillance aircraft; the Inguidar trainer; the Altania Saphir, a four-seat, kit built development; and the UAV MALE, a pilotless drone. The most radical variant was the Ameur Altajet, a pure jet version powered by two wing root positioned, 3.43 kN (770 lb st) thrust Williams EJ22 engines. None of these variants were built, though the Altajet and the RG 80 UL reached the mock up stage.

AAT was declared bankrupt in 2006 but the Altania design was taken up by Universal Composite Aviation (UCA). The four-seat UCA Carbon Bird CB-200 appeared at the Paris Aero shows of 2007 and 2009, though not in 2011; its current status is unclear.

== Specifications (Altania RG 80 UL) ==
Data from Jane's All the World's Aircraft 2006/7 Unbuilt variant, estimated data.

General characteristics

- Capacity: two
- Length: 6.00 m (19 ft 8 in)
- Wingspan: 7.70 m (25 ft 3 in)
- Height: 2.30 m (7 ft 7 in)
- Wing area: 6.22 m^{2} (67.0 sq ft) gross
- Aspect ratio: 9.5
- Empty weight: 265 kg (584 lb)
- Max takeoff weight: 472 kg (1,041 lb) approximately
- Fuel capacity: 328 L (86.6 US gal, 72.2 Imp gal) in certified version
- Powerplant: 1 × Jabiru 2200 flat four piston, 60 kW (80 hp)
- Propellers: 3-bladed

Performance

- Maximum speed: 287 km/h (178 mph, 155 kn)
- Cruise speed: 260 km/h (160 mph, 140 kn) maximum at 2,500 m (8,200 ft)
- Stall speed: 65 km/h (40 mph, 35 kn)
- Never exceed speed: 320 km/h (200 mph, 170 kn)
- Range: 1,605 km (997 mi, 867 nmi) carrying two
- Service ceiling: 5,500 m (18,000 ft)
- g limits: +6/-4
- Maximum glide ratio: 18.5

Avionics

- GPS and transponder standard.
- Glass cockpit optional
