= Raj Hamsa Voyager =

Indian ultralight aircraft

Voyager

General information
- Type: Ultralight trike
- National origin: India
- Manufacturer: Raj Hamsa Ultralights
- Status: In production (2013)

History
- Manufactured: 1990s-present
- Developed from: Raj Hamsa Clipper

The Raj Hamsa Voyager is an Indian ultralight trike, designed and produced by Raj Hamsa Ultralights since the 1990s. The aircraft is supplied as a complete ready-to-fly-aircraft.

== Design and development ==
The Voyager was designed as a cross country derivative of the Raj Hamsa Clipper trainer and complies with the Fédération Aéronautique Internationale microlight category, including the category's maximum gross weight of 450 kg (992 lb). The aircraft has a maximum gross weight of 360 kg (794 lb). It features a cable-braced hang glider-style high-wing, weight-shift controls, a two-seats-in-tandem open cockpit without a cockpit fairing, tricycle landing gear with optional wheel pants and a single engine in pusher configuration.

The aircraft is made from bolted-together aluminum tubing, with its double surface Raj Hamsa-made wing covered in Dacron sailcloth. Its 10.1 m (33.1 ft) span wing is supported by a single tube-type aerodynamically faired kingpost and uses an "A" frame weight-shift control bar. The wing is of a smaller area and faster design than the Clipper's wing and is mounted lower on a shorter mast. The landing gear has hydraulic suspension and large diameter wheels, to permit rough field operations. The powerplant is a twin cylinder, air-cooled, two-stroke, dual-ignition 50 hp (37 kW) Rotax 503 engine or the four cylinder, air-cooled, four-stroke, dual-ignition 85 hp (63 kW) Jabiru 2200 engine.

The aircraft has an empty weight of 160 kg (353 lb) and a gross weight of 360 kg (794 lb), giving a useful load of 200 kg (441 lb). With full fuel of 70 litres (15 imp gal; 18 US gal) the payload is 150 kg (331 lb).

== Specifications (Voyager) ==
Data from Bayerl and Raj Hamsa

General characteristics

- Crew: one
- Capacity: one passenger
- Wingspan: 10.1 m (33 ft 2 in)
- Wing area: 14.2 m^{2} (153 sq ft)
- Empty weight: 160 kg (353 lb)
- Gross weight: 360 kg (794 lb)
- Fuel capacity: 70 litres (15 imp gal; 18 US gal)
- Powerplant: 1 × Rotax 503 twin cylinder, air-cooled, two stroke aircraft engine, 37 kW (50 hp)
- Propellers: 3-bladed composite

Performance

- Maximum speed: 120 km/h (75 mph, 65 kn)
- Cruise speed: 90 km/h (56 mph, 49 kn)
- Stall speed: 55 km/h (34 mph, 30 kn)
- Range: 350 km (220 mi, 190 nmi)
- Endurance: 4.0 hours
- Service ceiling: 3,000 m (9,800 ft)
- Rate of climb: 3.0 m/s (590 ft/min)
- Wing loading: 25.4 kg/m^{2} (5.2 lb/sq ft)
