= Aeropilot Legend 540 =

Legend 540
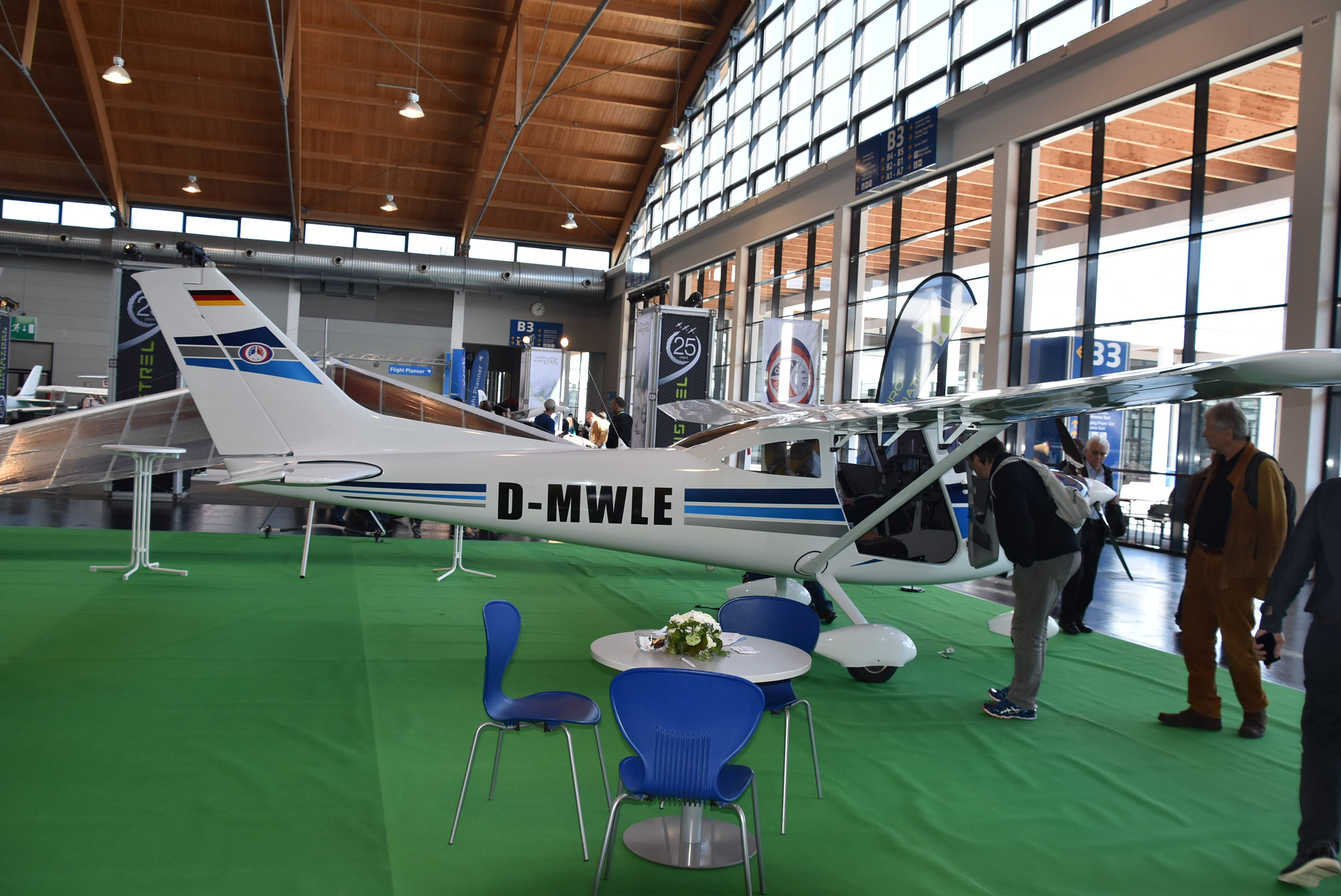

General information
- Type: Ultralight aircraft
- National origin: Czech Republic
- Manufacturer: Aeropilot
- Status: In production

History
- Introduction date: 2011

The Aeropilot Legend 540 is a Czech ultralight aircraft, designed and produced by Aeropilot, introduced at the Aero show held in Friedrichshafen in 2011. The aircraft is supplied complete and ready-to-fly-aircraft.

== Design and development ==
The Legend 540 is a scale two-seat version of the Cessna 182, rendered in composites, instead of sheet metal.

The aircraft was designed to comply with the Fédération Aéronautique Internationale microlight rules. It features a strut-braced high-wing, a two-seats-in-side-by-side configuration enclosed cockpit, tricycle landing gear and a single engine in tractor configuration.

The aircraft is made from carbon fibre. Its 9.06 m (29.7 ft) span wing employs flaps. Standard engines available are the 100 hp (75 kW) Rotax 912ULS and the 85 hp (63 kW) Jabiru 2200 four-stroke powerplants.

== Specifications (Legend 540) ==
Data from Bayerl

General characteristics

- Crew: one
- Capacity: one passenger
- Length: 7 m (23 ft 0 in)
- Wingspan: 9.06 m (29 ft 9 in)
- Height: 2.6 m (8 ft 6 in)
- Wing area: 10.54 m^{2} (113.5 sq ft)
- Airfoil: MS313
- Empty weight: 289 kg (637 lb)
- Gross weight: 472.5 kg (1,042 lb)
- Fuel capacity: 100 litres (22 imp gal; 26 US gal)
- Powerplant: 1 × Rotax 912ULS four cylinder, liquid and air-cooled, four stroke, 75 kW (100 hp)

Performance

- Maximum speed: 225 km/h (140 mph, 121 kn)
- Cruise speed: 210 km/h (130 mph, 110 kn) 75% power
- Stall speed: 62 km/h (39 mph, 33 kn)
- Never exceed speed: 255 km/h (158 mph, 138 kn)
- Range: 1,300 km (810 mi, 700 nmi)
- Endurance: 7 hours
- Rate of climb: 7 m/s (1,400 ft/min)
