= Raj Hamsa X-Air =

X-Air
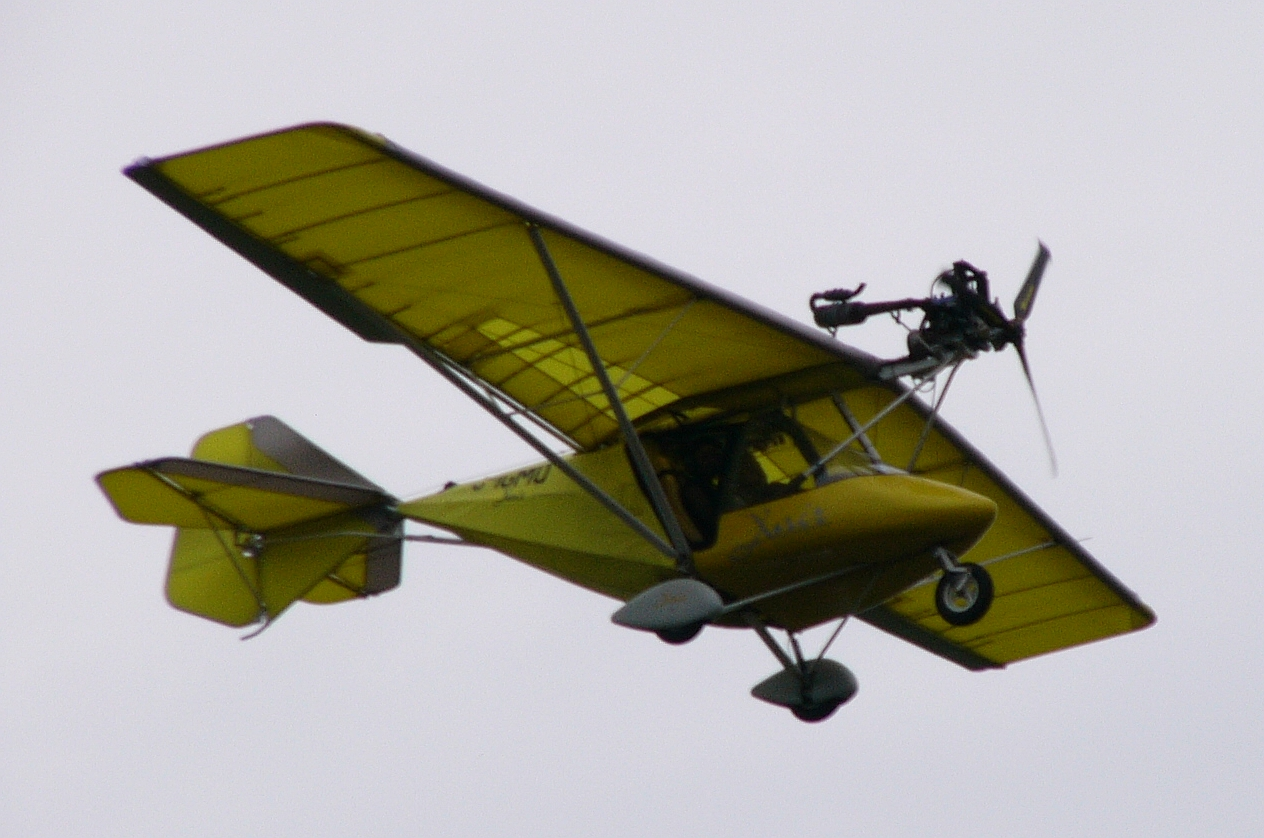
- X-Air "S"

General information
- Type: Kit aircraft
- National origin: India
- Manufacturer: Raj Hamsa Ultralights
- Designer: Piero Mezzapezza & Joel Koechlin
- Primary users: Indian Air Force
- Number built: 804 (December 2011)

History
- Manufactured: 1993-present
- Introduction date: 1993
- Developed from: Chotia Weedhopper
- Variant: X-Air Hanuman

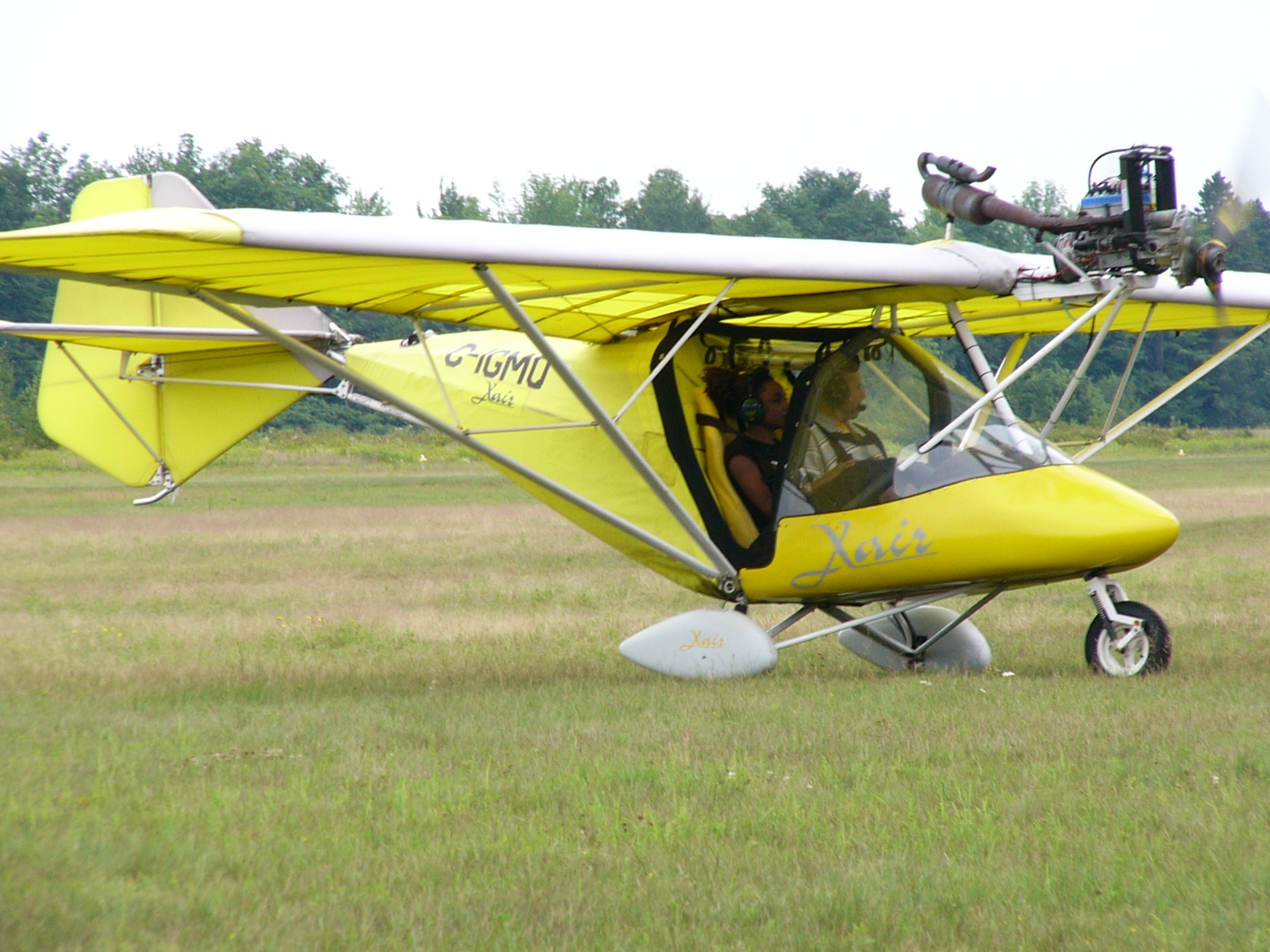
X-Air "S"

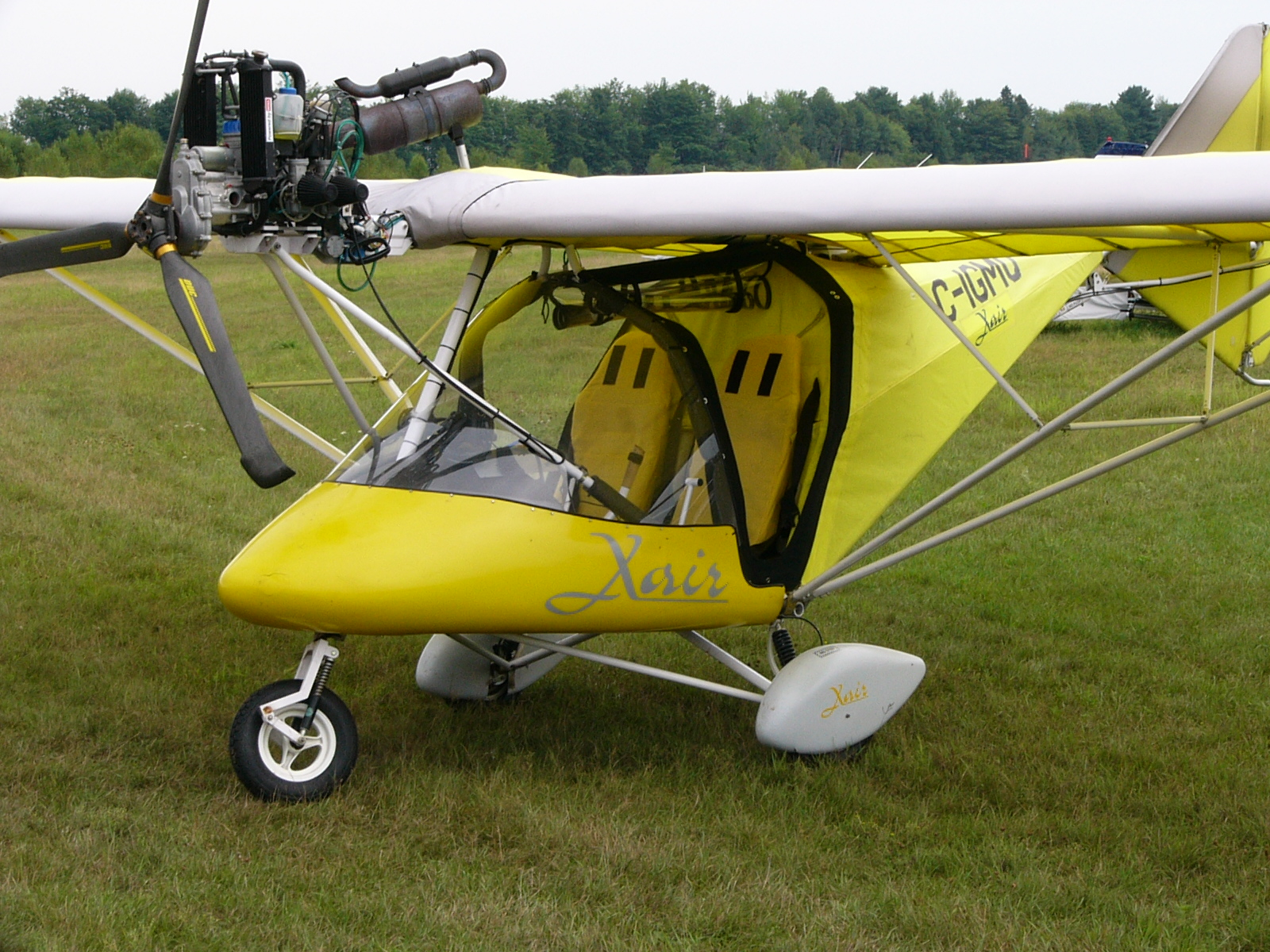
X-Air "S"

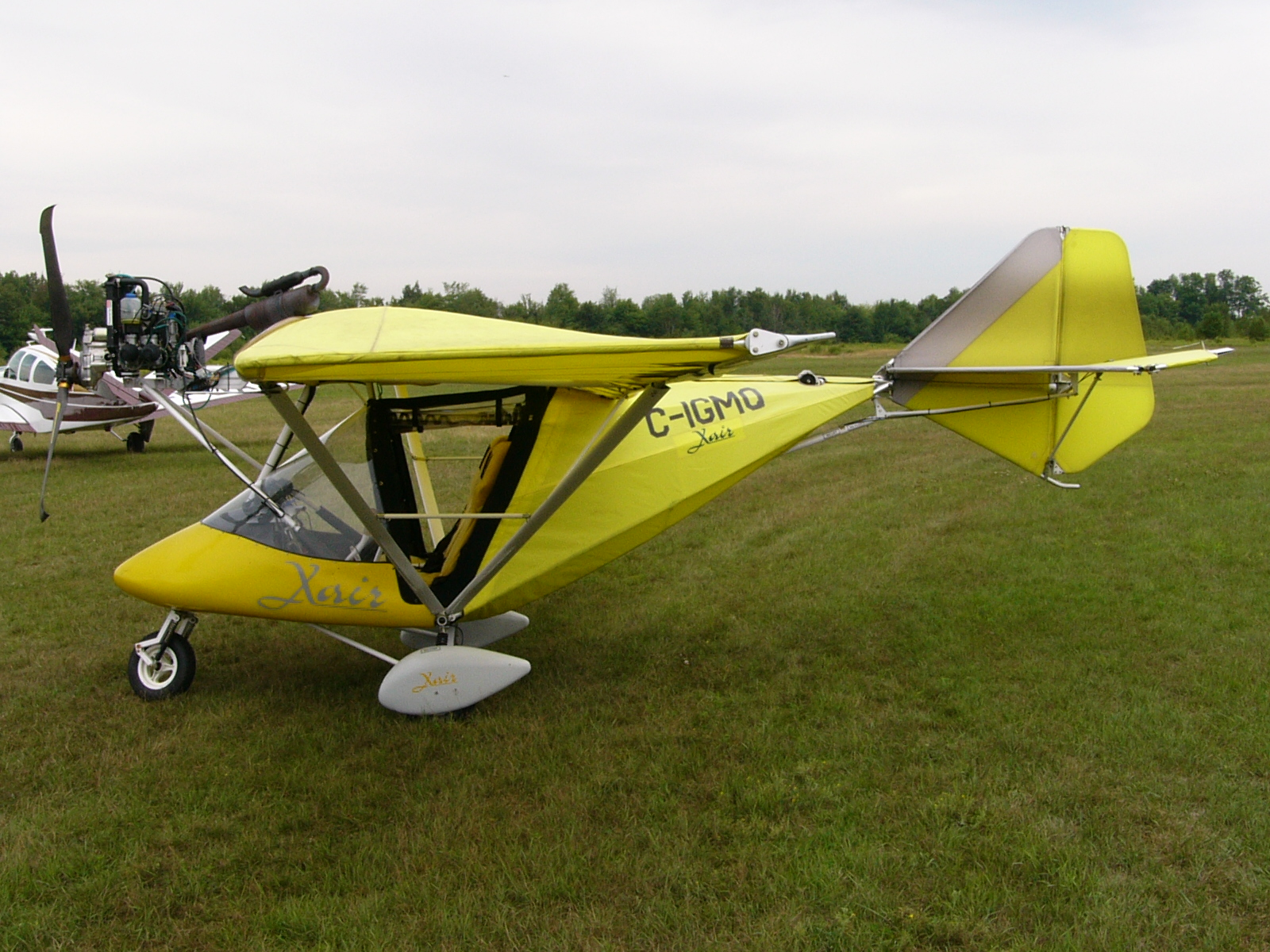
X-Air "S"

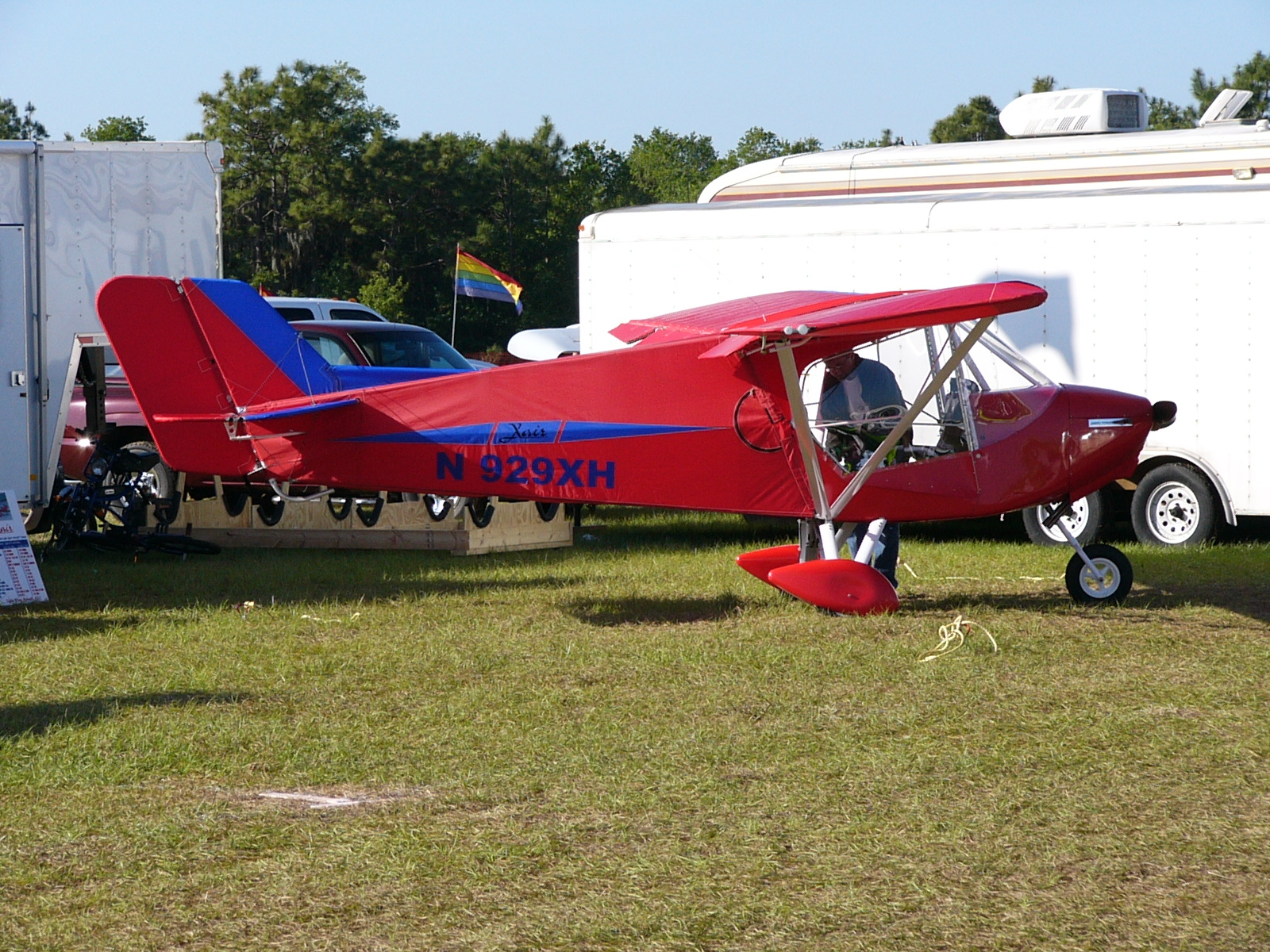
X-Air Hanuman variant

The Raj Hamsa X-Air is an Indian two-seat, high-wing, tricycle gear, tractor configuration, ultralight aircraft produced by Raj Hamsa Ultralights of Bangalore, Karnataka in kit form, for amateur construction.

== Design and development ==
The X-Air started as a development of the Chotia Weedhopper redesigned to incorporate ailerons and an enclosed cabin. After initial production in Europe manufacturing was shifted to Raj Hamsa in India. In many countries the aircraft is known as the Rand Kar X-Air. In the USA it is sometimes referred to as the Light Wing X-Air. The aircraft was later developed into the more conventional X-Air Hanuman, which relocated the engine from the upper keel tube to the nose.

The X-Air is built from bolted aluminium tubing, mated to a central welded steel cockpit cage. The wings and tail surfaces are covered in pre-sewn Dacron sailcloth envelopes. The aircraft is built around its keel, a large tube that runs from the high-mounted engine in the front to the tail in the back. The wings are supported by V-struts with jury struts. The landing gear incorporates oleo shock absorbers on all three wheels. The nosewheel is steerable and mainwheel brakes are standard. Dual controls are standard, but cockpit doors are optional. The cockpit has been criticized by reviewer Andre Cliche as "a bit difficult to access".

The X-Air can be fitted with either floats or skis. Engines from 50 to 75 hp (37 to 56 kW) can be fitted, provided they weigh under 120 lb (54 kg). The construction time is estimated at 40 hours.

== Operational history ==
Due to its low price and BCAR Section "S" certification the X-Air has proven popular in the United Kingdom.

An X-Air has been used as a testbed for the prototype D-Motor LF26 flathead engine.

== Variants ==
X-Air "S" (Standard)
Initial version, certified under UK BCAR Section "S" as a microlight. Standard engine is the 64 hp (48 kW) Rotax 582 and the 80 hp (60 kW) Rotax 912UL, 85 hp (63 kW) Jabiru 2200 and the 60 hp (45 kW) HKS 700E four-stroke powerplants are also used. The design is popular in the UK, especially with the Jabiru engine.
X-Air "F" Gumnam
Improved version, aerodynamically cleaned up, extended fuselage with baggage compartment, Lexan doors and wheel pants are standard. The wing is 1 m (39 in) shorter, with a higher aspect ratio, 100% double surface, flaps and a NACA 4412 airfoil. Certified under UK BCAR Section "S" as a microlight and marketed in the UK as the X-Air Falcon. Standard engine is the 64 hp (48 kW) Rotax 582, although the 50 hp (37 kW) Rotax 503 or 85 hp (63 kW) Jabiru 2200 four-stroke engine can be used.
X-Air "H" Hanuman
Development version, with nose-mounted 85 hp (63 kW) Jabiru 2200 four-stroke engine.

== Specifications (X-Air "S") ==
Data from Raj Hamsa

General characteristics

- Crew: one
- Capacity: one passenger
- Length: 5.65 m (18 ft 6 in)
- Wingspan: 9.80 m (32 ft 2 in)
- Height: 2.55 m (8 ft 4 in)
- Empty weight: 240 kg (529 lb)
- Fuel capacity: 13 U.S. gallons (49 L; 11 imp gal)
- Powerplant: 1 × Rotax 582 twin-cylinder, two-stroke, aircraft engine, 48 kW (64 hp)
- Propellers: 3-bladed ground adjustable

Performance

- Maximum speed: 120 km/h (75 mph, 65 kn)
- Cruise speed: 100 km/h (62 mph, 54 kn)
- Stall speed: 45 km/h (28 mph, 24 kn)
- Service ceiling: 3,700 m (12,000 ft)
- Maximum glide ratio: 9:1
- Rate of climb: 3.0 m/s (590 ft/min)

== See also ==
Related development

- X-Air Hanuman

Aircraft of comparable role, configuration, and era

- Thruster T600 Sprint
