= Nexaer LS1 =

American light-sport aircraft

LS1

General information
- Type: Light-sport aircraft
- National origin: United States
- Manufacturer: Nexaer
- Status: Under development (2012)
- Number built: One

History
- First flight: 16 October 2006

The Nexaer LS1 is an American light-sport aircraft, under development by Nexaer of Peyton, Colorado, first flown on 16 October 2006. The aircraft is intended to be supplied as a complete ready-to-fly-aircraft.

== Design and development ==
The LS1 was designed to comply with the US light-sport aircraft rules. It features a cantilever low-wing, a two-seats-in-side-by-side configuration enclosed cockpit, fixed tricycle landing gear and a single engine in tractor configuration. The LS1 has a distinctively curved fuselage.

The aircraft is made from composites. Its 29.5 ft (9.0 m) span wing has an area of 124 sq ft (11.5 m^{2}) and for simplicity has no flaps. Standard engines available are the 100 hp (75 kW) Rotax 912ULS, 85 hp (63 kW) Jabiru 2200, 120 hp (89 kW) Jabiru 3300, 100 hp (75 kW) Continental O-200 and the 108 hp (81 kW) Lycoming O-235 four-stroke powerplants. The cockpit is 54 in (137 cm) in width.

== Specifications (LS1) ==
Data from Bayerl and Nexaer

General characteristics

- Crew: one
- Capacity: one passenger
- Length: 23 ft 3 in (7.09 m)
- Wingspan: 29 ft 6 in (8.99 m)
- Height: 7 ft 10 in (2.39 m)
- Wing area: 124 sq ft (11.5 m^{2})
- Empty weight: 750 lb (340 kg)
- Gross weight: 1,320 lb (599 kg)
- Fuel capacity: 27 U.S. gallons (100 L; 22 imp gal)
- Powerplant: 1 × Jabiru 2200 four cylinder, air-cooled, four stroke aircraft engine, 85 hp (63 kW)

Performance

- Maximum speed: 140 mph (220 km/h, 120 kn)
- Cruise speed: 120 mph (200 km/h, 110 kn)
- Stall speed: 51 mph (82 km/h, 44 kn)
- g limits: +4.5/-2.0
- Wing loading: 10.6 lb/sq ft (52 kg/m^{2})
