= TMM Avia T-10 Avia-Tor =

T-10 Avia-Tor
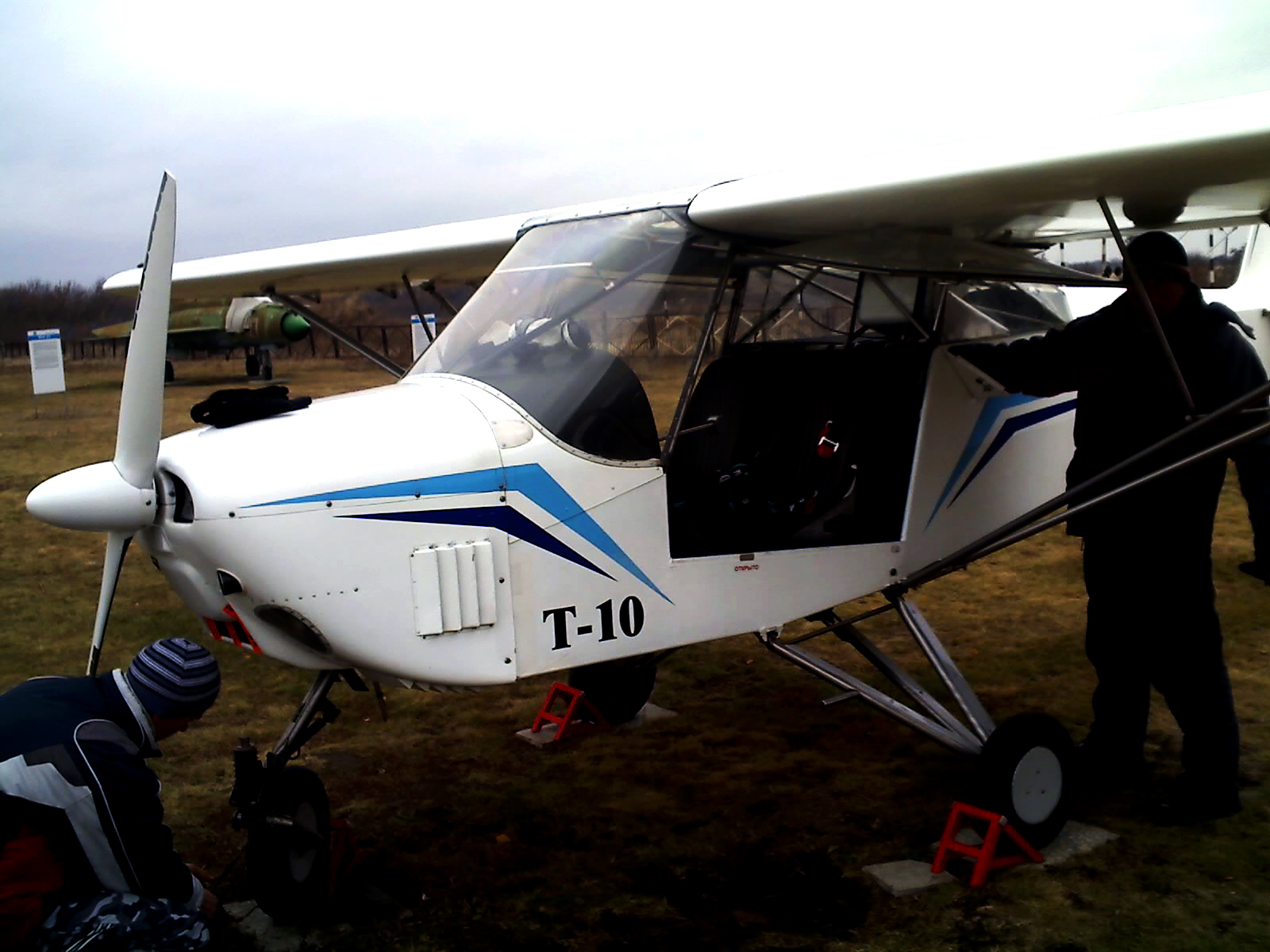

General information
- Type: Light aircraft
- National origin: Ukraine
- Manufacturer: TMM-Avia, Kharkiv
- Designer: Serhiy Ryabikov
- Status: In production (2015)
- Number built: at least 6

History
- First flight: 2002

The TMM Avia T-10 Avia-Tor is a single engine two seat Ukrainian light aircraft, with a high wing and transparent blister cabin doors for extra visibility, designed to be robust enough for a range of applications.

== Design ==
The Avia-Tor is a conventionally arranged single engine high wing light aircraft, seating two side-by-side. It was designed as a sport machine, with applications as a basic trainer, agricultural sprayer, patroller and air photographer.

It has constant chord wings built around two wooden spars with fibreglass ribs and synthetic fabric covering. They are braced from the lower fuselage with V-struts on each side, assisted by further intermediate bracing. Three position (0°, 10° and 40°) flaps are fitted. The square sided fuselage has a stainless steel truss structure and is fabric covered apart from the glass fibre engine cowling and cabin roof. The two upward hinged cabin doors are entirely transparent blisters for optimum visibility. The empennage is formed from steel tubes with fibreglass ribs, all fabric covered. The tailplane is wire braced from above to the fin with a pair of wires on each side and similarly below to the lower fuselage. The elevators are mass balanced and the port side one has a trim tab. The rudder also has a tab. Wings and tailplane can be easily folded for transport.

The Avia-Tor normally uses a fixed tricycle undercarriage, though floats or skis are options. Each mainwheel is supported by a V-pair of struts joined to the lower fuselage longerons and with a half-axle from wheel to the central fuselage. A MVEN KS-500-2 Cobra ballistic parachute recovery system is standard.

== Development ==
The first prototype flew in 2002 and was followed by four more T-10 pre-production aircraft. These were followed by a batch of production T-10M machines for purchase as complete aircraft. The production of kits may follow.

The T-10M has some changes to undercarriage and fin, plus a change of engine. The main gear sprung element has been moved from the half-axle to the rearward V strut and the early castoring nosewheel replaced with a steerable system with a simpler single leg. The fin of the T-10M is more angular and narrower than that of the T-10 and incorporates a triangular fillet. The T-10s are powered by 60 kW (80 hp) Jabiru 2200s, the T-10Ms by 74 kW (100 hp) Rotax 912S flat four engines.

== Operational history ==
Four of the five T-10 pre-production aircraft are currently on sale as T-10 Frigates. All five T-10s and one T-10M aircraft remain on the Ukrainian private aircraft register in mid-2010. Ukrainian certification was anticipated in 2009.

Engenious Aerospace Ltd (EAL) has the Indian dealership for the T-10.

== Specifications ==
Data from Jane's All the World's Aircraft 2010/11

General characteristics

- Capacity: 2
- Length: 6.355 m (20 ft 10 in)
- Wingspan: 9.13 m (29 ft 11 in)
- Height: 2.24 m (7 ft 4 in)
- Wing area: 13.70 m^{2} (147.5 sq ft)
- Airfoil: TsAGI R-IIIa 12%
- Empty weight: 315 kg (694 lb) including ballistic rescue parachute
- Max takeoff weight: 550 kg (1,213 lb)
- Powerplant: 1 × Rotax 912S flat four , 73.5 kW (98.6 hp)
- Propellers: 2-bladed fixed pitch, wooden, 1.86 m (6 ft 1 in) diameter

Performance

- Maximum speed: 190 km/h (120 mph, 100 kn)
- Cruise speed: 150 km/h (93 mph, 81 kn)
- Stall speed: 65 km/h (40 mph, 35 kn) flaps down
- Never exceed speed: 255 km/h (158 mph, 138 kn)
- Range: 700 km (430 mi, 380 nmi)
- Service ceiling: 3,000 m (9,800 ft) maximum certified altitude
- g limits: +4/-2
- Rate of climb: 6.2 m/s (1,220 ft/min) pilot only
