= Coavio DF 2000 =

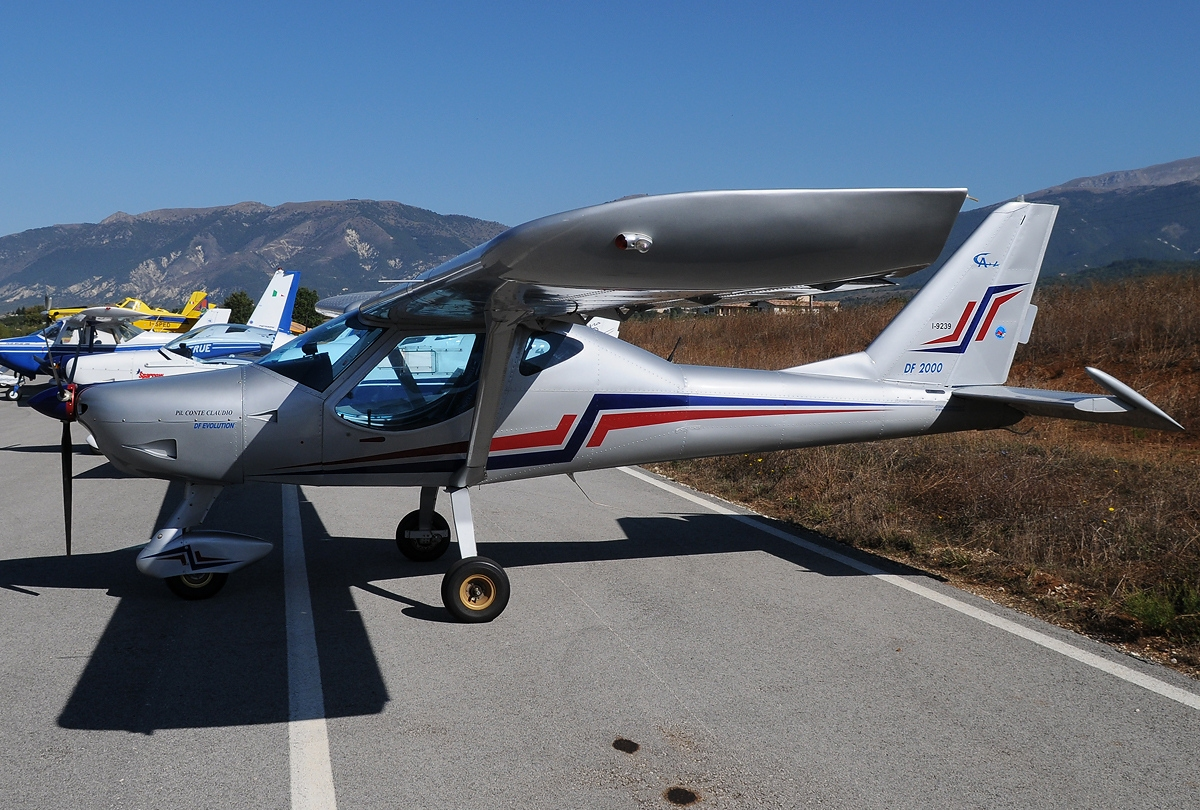

General information
- Type: Two seat ultralight aircraft
- National origin: Italy
- Manufacturer: Coavio Costruzioni Aeronautiche, Frosinone, Lazio
- Designer: Antonio dell'Orco
- Number built: 54 up to 2021

History
- Introduction date: 2004
- First flight: 2001

The Coavio DF 2000 is a single-engine, high-wing all-metal ultralight aircraft with side-by-side seating for two. Built in Italy, production began in 2004.

== Design and development ==
The DF 2000 was designed to provide a fast, robust, comfortable, low-cost side-by-side two-seat ultralight with a short take-off run. It has a conventional layout not unlike that of, for example, the Cessna 152, with a high wing, swept vertical tail and tricycle undercarriage.

Structurally, it is mostly built from aluminium alloy, reinforced with TIG-welded 4130 steel tubing in the cockpit area. The wing has constant chord and is braced on each side by a single, broad streamlined strut from the bottom of the fuselage. The shallow, turned-up wing tips are formed from composites. Inboard flaps are fitted. The cockpit area, under the wings and fitted with dual controls, is accessed by upward-hinged doors with deep glazing. Aft, the fuselage becomes more slender, though the swept fin has a long fillet. The rudder has a trim tab and the low-set, parallel-chord tailplane carries a balanced elevator. The tricycle undercarriage has main wheels which are cantilever spring-mounted from the lower fuselage and a steerable nose wheel. All wheels are usually spatted.

The DF 2000 family uses several engine/propeller combinations, mostly from the Rotax 912 series of 80 to 100 hp (60 to 75 kW) flat-4s but also the 85 hp (63 kW) Jabiru 2200 and 120 hp (89 kW) Jabiru 3300 powerplants.

The DF 2000 first flew in about 2001 and went into production three years later. .

== Operational history ==
54 DF 2000 series aircraft have been built up to 2021.

== Variants ==
Details from the manufacturer.

Spartan
Lightest DF 2000, 60 kW (80 hp) Rotax 912 UL engine, 2-blade wooden propeller. Mechanical trim control and flap actuation.
DF 2000 Light (or Base)
Standard version, as Spartan but painted and with oil pressure gauge.
DF 2000 Plus
75 kW (100 hp) Rotax 912 ULS engine, composite 3-bladed propeller with ground-adjustable pitch. Electrical elevator trim control and flap actuation, flap hinge fairing, partial cabin ventilation and additional instrumentation. Wheel spats and landing light.
DF 2000 Top
As Plus with a bigger oil cooler, radio and further instrumentation, upholstered seats and cabin panelling. Landing lights, radio and cockpit heater standard. Two-colour external paintwork. Flight-adjustable pitch propeller an option.
DA Evolution
de Luxe version with either 75 kW (100 hp) Rotax 912 ULS or 64 kW (86 hp) Jabiru 2200 engine. As Top, but with full cabin ventilation, improved seating and electrical aileron trim control. Improved external lighting. Three colour external paintwork and bigger spinner.

== Specifications (DF 2000 Top) ==
Data from Jane's All the World's Aircraft 2010/11

General characteristics

- Capacity: 2
- Length: 6.35 m (41 ft 8 in)
- Wingspan: 9.60 m (63 ft 0 in)
- Height: 2.40 m (15 ft 8.94 in)
- Wing area: 11.60 m^{2} (124.86 sq ft) gross
- Empty weight: 285 kg (628 lb)
- Max takeoff weight: 450 kg (992 lb)
- Fuel capacity: 75L
- Powerplant: 1 × Rotax 912 ULS 4-cylinder horizontally opposed liquid cooled piston, 75 kW (101 hp)
- Propellers: 3-bladed composite

Performance

- Maximum speed: 240 km/h (149 mph, 129 kn) in calm air
- Cruise speed: 195 km/h (121 mph, 105 kn) at 75% power
- Stall speed: 45 km/h (28 mph, 24 kn) with flaps extended
- Never exceed speed: 240 km/h (149 mph, 129 kn)
- Range: 680 km (420 mi, 367 nmi) at 195 km/h (with 30 mins of reserve)
- Endurance: 3.5 h (with 30 mins of reserve)
- g limits: +4/-2
- Maximum glide ratio: 12
- Rate of climb: 5.0 m/s (990 ft/min)
- Take-off distance: 100 m (330 ft)
- Landing distance: 80 m (265 ft)
