= Lucas L11 =

French ultralight aircraft

L11

General information
- Type: Ultralight aircraft
- National origin: France
- Designer: Emile Lucas
- Status: Plans available

The Lucas L11 is a French ultralight aircraft that was designed by Emile Lucas. The aircraft is supplied in the form of plans for amateur construction.

== Design and development ==
The aircraft was designed to comply with the Fédération Aéronautique Internationale microlight rules. It features a cantilever low-wing, a two-seats-in-side-by-side configuration enclosed cockpit, fixed tricycle landing gear and a single engine in tractor configuration.

The aircraft is made from sheet aluminum with its windshield made from a single piece of flat plastic to save money on construction costs. Access to the cockpit is via gull-winged doors. Its 8.40 ft (2.6 m) span wing has an area of 9.00 m^{2} (96.9 sq ft) and is equipped with flaps. The standard recommended engine is the 85 hp (63 kW) Jabiru 2200 four-stroke powerplant.

== Variants ==
L 11
Base model with a tapered wing.
L 12
Version with a rectangular wing and simplified construction, offered as a kit only.

== Specifications (L11) ==
Data from Bayerl

General characteristics

- Crew: one
- Capacity: one passenger
- Wingspan: 8.40 m (27 ft 7 in)
- Wing area: 9.00 m^{2} (96.9 sq ft)
- Empty weight: 275 kg (606 lb)
- Gross weight: 450 kg (992 lb)
- Fuel capacity: 80 litres (18 imp gal; 21 US gal)
- Powerplant: 1 × Jabiru 2200 four cylinder, air-cooled, four stroke aircraft engine, 63 kW (85 hp)
- Propellers: 2-bladed composite

Performance

- Maximum speed: 203 km/h (126 mph, 110 kn)
- Cruise speed: 180 km/h (110 mph, 97 kn)
- Stall speed: 65 km/h (40 mph, 35 kn)
- Rate of climb: 5 m/s (980 ft/min)
