= FMP Qualt 201 =

Czech ultralight aircraft

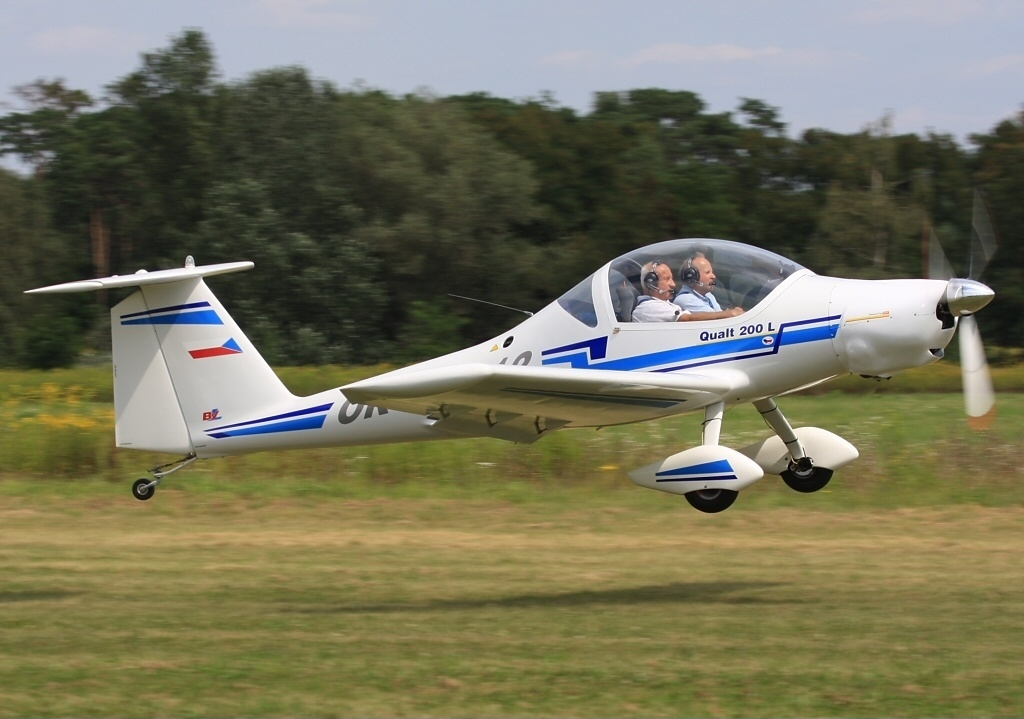
- Qualt 200

General information
- Type: Ultralight aircraft and Light-sport aircraft
- National origin: Czech Republic
- Manufacturer: FMP s.r.o.
- Status: In production

History
- Developed from: FMP Qualt 200

The FMP Qualt 201 is a Czech ultralight and light-sport aircraft, designed and produced by FMP s.r.o. of Prague. The aircraft is supplied as a complete ready-to-fly-aircraft.

== Design and development ==
The Qualt 201 was derived from the earlier FMP Qualt 200, which it replaced in production. The 201 was designed to comply with the Fédération Aéronautique Internationale microlight rules and US light-sport aircraft rules. It features a cantilever low-wing, a two-seats-in-side-by-side configuration enclosed open cockpit under a bubble canopy, fixed conventional landing gear, a T-tail and a single engine in tractor configuration.

The aircraft is made from composites. Its 9.2 m (30.2 ft) span wing has an area of 10.5 m^{2} (113 sq ft) and mounts split-style flaps. Standard engines available are the 64 hp (48 kW) Rotax 582 two-stroke, the 80 hp (60 kW) Rotax 912UL, the 100 hp (75 kW) Rotax 912ULS and the 85 hp (63 kW) Jabiru 2200 four-stroke powerplants.

== Specifications (Qualt 201) ==
Data from Bayerl

General characteristics

- Crew: one
- Capacity: one passenger
- Wingspan: 9.2 m (30 ft 2 in)
- Height: 1.7 m (5 ft 7 in)
- Wing area: 10.5 m^{2} (113 sq ft)
- Empty weight: 280 kg (617 lb)
- Gross weight: 472.5 kg (1,042 lb)
- Fuel capacity: 48 litres (11 imp gal; 13 US gal)
- Powerplant: 1 × Jabiru 2200 four cylinder, air-cooled, four stroke aircraft engine, 63 kW (85 hp)

Performance

- Maximum speed: 230 km/h (140 mph, 120 kn)
- Cruise speed: 170 km/h (110 mph, 92 kn)
- Stall speed: 60 km/h (37 mph, 32 kn)
- Rate of climb: 6 m/s (1,200 ft/min)
- Wing loading: 45.0 kg/m^{2} (9.2 lb/sq ft)
