= Aviakit Vega =

Véga
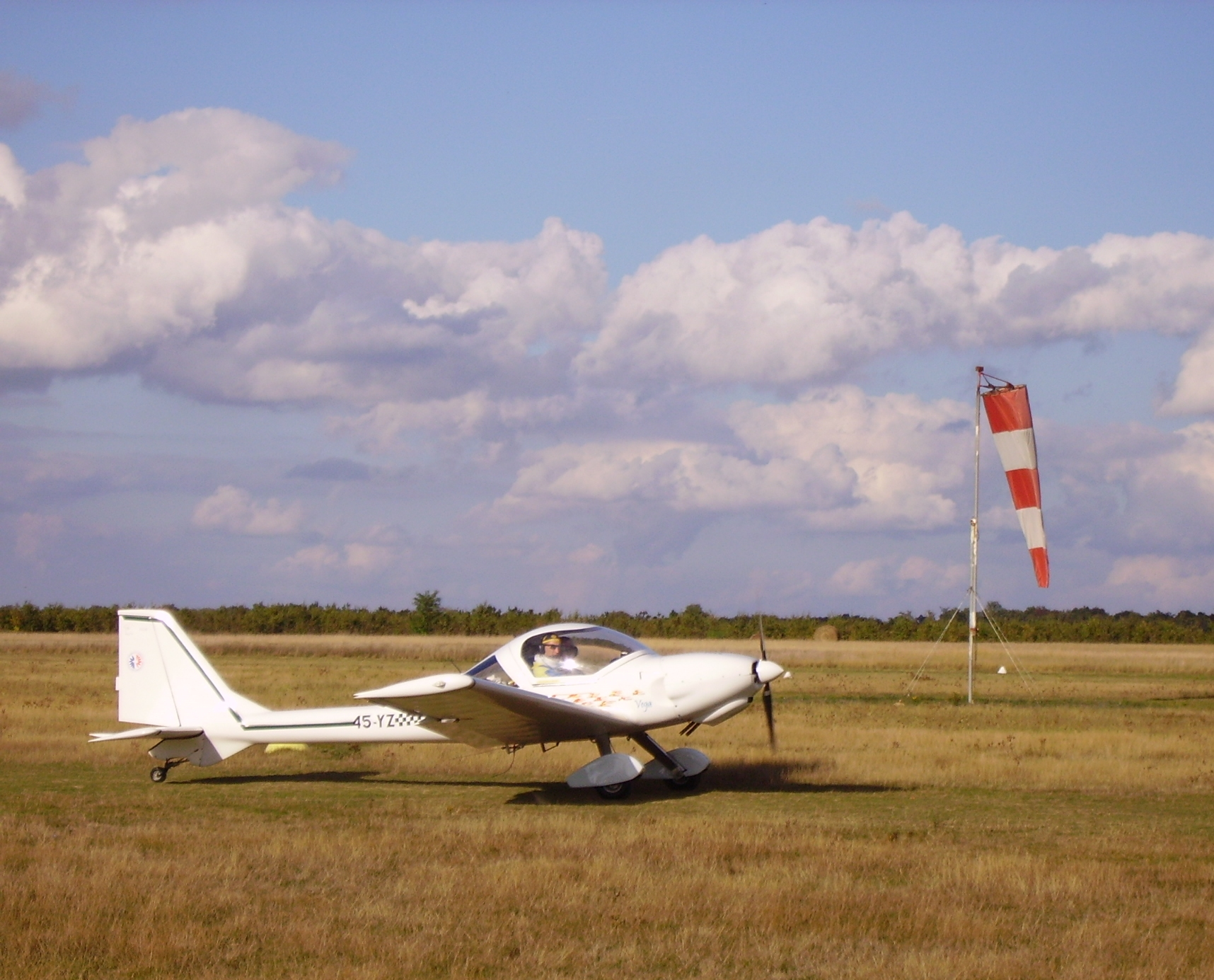
- PJB Vega

General information
- Type: Two seat kit built ultralight
- National origin: France
- Manufacturer: Aviakit Flight Concept SARL
- Designer: Roland Prevot
- Number built: c.50 registered

History
- First flight: c.1997

The Aviakit Véga is an ultralight aircraft seating two in side-by-side configuration. It was designed in France in the late 1990s to be easily constructed by amateurs from kits and was offered with a choice of three engines and of tricycle or conventional undercarriages.

== Design and development ==
Roland Prevot started Aviakit to produce kits for home building of his two-seat, side-by-side configuration, ultralight design, originally named the Aviakit Hermès. It was intended as an ultralight that could be quite quickly (300 hours) assembled by inexperienced constructors. In September 2001 production rights were acquired by PJB Aerocomposite and the aircraft renamed the Aviakit Véga 2000 or Aerocomposite Véga 2000 but the arrangement ran into financial difficulties and in June 2004 Aviakit were reformed to produce what has since been known as the Aviakit Véga 3000.

The Hermès was built from a mixture of wood and composite material but the later Véga models are largely composite aircraft. The single spar, low wing is straight tapered, with 5° of dihedral and fitted with flaps. The fuselage is wide over the wing to accommodate the seating under a prominent, two piece canopy. One of three different four cylinder, horizontally opposed engines may be fitted: the 80 hp (60 kW) Jabiru 2200, the 80 hp (60 kW) Rotax 912UL or the 99 hp (74 kW) Rotax 912ULS. The standard propeller is two-bladed, though there are alternatives. Behind the cabin the fuselage becomes slender. The Hermès had a strut braced cruciform tail and at least one Véga had a braced T-tail; later aircraft have a cantilever tailplane set low on the fuselage. Since 1998 the rudder has carried a trim tab. Beneath the tail there is a dorsal fin. The Véga has a fixed, cantilever undercarriage which may be of tricycle or conventional layout. The mainwheels have hydraulic brakes and may be enclosed within speed fairings.

== Operational history ==
Thirty five Aviakit Hermès kits were produced before the Aerocomposite take-over, fourteen appearing in the 2010 European registers. These also show thirty seven Végas, all but one Aviakit Végas with just one Aerocomposite Véga. Where the model is given, most Végas are 2000s, with only two 3000s.

Vegas were exhibited at the 2001 Paris Salon and at Aero '05, held in Friedrichshafen in April 2005.

== Variants ==
Hèrmes
Véga 2000
Low mounted tailplane, shorter span wings and cut-away base of rudder.
Véga 3000 CXhp
C= Classique, conventional undercarriage, X= J (Jabiru) or R (Rotax), hp = engine hp.
Véga 3000 TXhp
T= tricycle undercarriage.

== Specifications (Véga 3000, Rotax 912 ULS and parachute) ==
Data from Jane's All the World's Aircraft 2006/7

General characteristics

- Capacity: Two
- Length: 6.50 m (21 ft 4 in)
- Wingspan: 9.35 m (30 ft 8 in)
- Height: 1.80 m (5 ft 11 in)
- Wing area: 11.50 m^{2} (123.8 sq ft)
- Airfoil: NACA 23015
- Empty weight: 264 kg (582 lb)
- Max takeoff weight: 472.5 kg (1,042 lb) ultralight. Experimental 560 kg (1,234 lb)
- Fuel capacity: 80 L (21.1 US gal; 17.6 Imp gal)
- Powerplant: 1 × Rotax 912 ULS air- and water-cooled, horizontally opposed four-cylinder, four-stroke, 73.5 kW (98.6 hp)
- Propellers: 2-bladed Duc fixed pitch carbon fibre

Performance

- Maximum speed: 220 km/h (140 mph, 120 kn)
- Cruise speed: 210 km/h (130 mph, 110 kn) at 75% power
- Stall speed: 62 km/h (39 mph, 33 kn) with 10° flaps
- Never exceed speed: 250 km/h (160 mph, 130 kn)
- Range: 945 km (587 mi, 510 nmi)
- Rate of climb: 8.5 m/s (1,670 ft/min) at sea level
- Take-off run: 150 m (495 ft)
- Landing run: 100 m (330 ft)
