= Plumb BGP-1 =

British homebuilt aircraft

Plumb BGP-1 Biplane
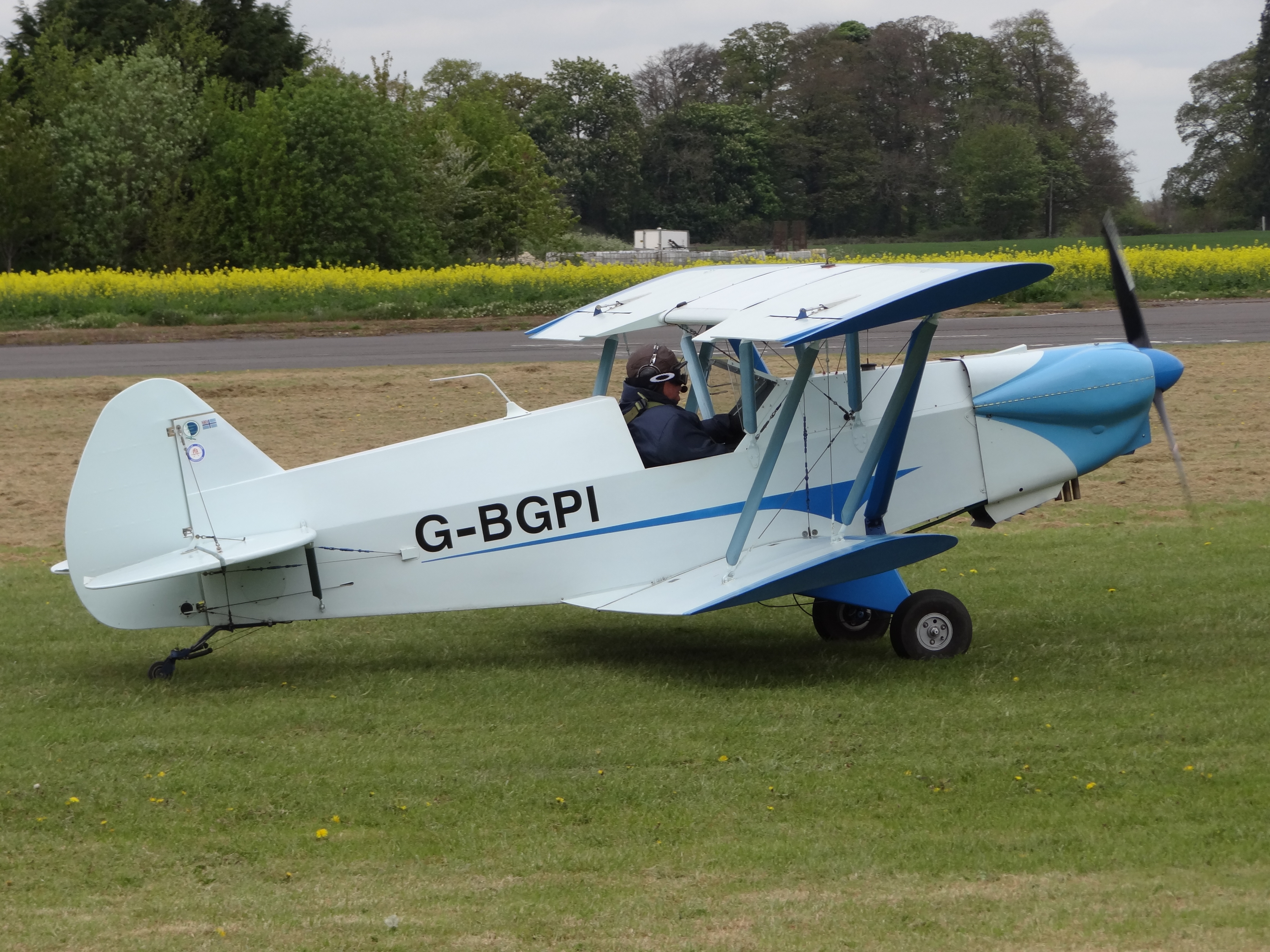
- Prototype leaving Turweston Aerodrome in April 2017

General information
- Type: Homebuilt aircraft
- National origin: United Kingdom
- Designer: Barry Plumb
- Number built: 2

History
- First flight: 1986

The Plumb BGP-1 is a British single-seat homebuilt biplane developed by Barry Plumb.

== Design and development ==
The aircraft is patterned after the Pitts Special and is made predominantly from wood. The first example of Plumb's biplane was built between 1975 and 1986 and is on a Popular Flying Association (now Light Aircraft Association) permit to fly.

The aircraft was originally powered by a Volkswagen 1834 engine but now uses a Jabiru 2200A model

A second example, was finished in 2015 and uses a Volkswagen 1834 engine.

== Specifications (prototype) ==
Data from Steen Aero

General characteristics

- Crew: 1
- Wingspan: 4.87 m (16 ft 0 in)
- Powerplant: 1 × Jabiru 2200A , 60 kW (80 hp)

Performance

- Cruise speed: 120 km/h (75 mph, 65 kn)
- Stall speed: 72 km/h (45 mph, 39 kn)
- Never exceed speed: 232 km/h (144 mph, 125 kn)

== See also ==
Similar aircraft

- EAA Biplane
- Currie Wot
- Tipsy Nipper
