= Raj Hamsa Clipper =

Indian ultralight aircraft

Clipper

General information
- Type: Ultralight trike
- National origin: India
- Manufacturer: Raj Hamsa Ultralights
- Status: In production (2013)

History
- Manufactured: 1990s-present
- Variant: Raj Hamsa Voyager

The Raj Hamsa Clipper is an Indian ultralight trike, designed and produced by Raj Hamsa Ultralights since the 1990s. The aircraft is supplied as a complete ready-to-fly-aircraft.

== Design and development ==
The Clipper was designed as a trainer for school use and complies with the Fédération Aéronautique Internationale microlight category, including the category's maximum gross weight of 450 kg (992 lb). The aircraft has a maximum gross weight of 350 kg (772 lb). It features a cable-braced hang glider-style high-wing, weight-shift controls, a two-seats-in-tandem open cockpit without a cockpit fairing, tricycle landing gear and a single engine in pusher configuration.

The Clipper was developed into the longer range Raj Hamsa Voyager.

The aircraft is made from bolted-together aluminum tubing, with its double surface Raj Hamsa-made wing covered in Dacron sailcloth. Its 10.1 m (33.1 ft) span wing is supported by a single tube-type kingpost and uses an "A" frame weight-shift control bar. The powerplant is a twin cylinder, air-cooled, two-stroke, dual-ignition 50 hp (37 kW) Rotax 503 engine or the twin cylinder, air-cooled, two-stroke, dual-ignition 65 hp (48 kW) Hirth 2706 engine.

The aircraft has an empty weight of 160 kg (353 lb) and a gross weight of 350 kg (772 lb), giving a useful load of 190 kg (419 lb). With full fuel of 25 litres (5.5 imp gal; 6.6 US gal) the payload is 172 kg (379 lb).

== Specifications (Clipper) ==
Data from Bayerl and Raj Hamsa

General characteristics

- Crew: one
- Capacity: one passenger
- Wingspan: 10.1 m (33 ft 2 in)
- Wing area: 16.0 m^{2} (172 sq ft)
- Empty weight: 160 kg (353 lb)
- Gross weight: 350 kg (772 lb)
- Fuel capacity: 25 litres (5.5 imp gal; 6.6 US gal)
- Powerplant: 1 × Rotax 503 twin cylinder, air-cooled, two stroke aircraft engine, 37 kW (50 hp)
- Propellers: 2-bladed wooden

Performance

- Maximum speed: 100 km/h (62 mph, 54 kn)
- Cruise speed: 70 km/h (43 mph, 38 kn)
- Stall speed: 50 km/h (31 mph, 27 kn)
- Range: 140 km (87 mi, 76 nmi)
- Endurance: 2.0 hours
- Service ceiling: 3,000 m (9,800 ft)
- Rate of climb: 3.5 m/s (690 ft/min)
- Wing loading: 21.9 kg/m^{2} (4.5 lb/sq ft)
