= Moragon Stela =

General information
- Type: Fixed-wing microlight aircraft
- National origin: Spain
- Manufacturer: Aeromoragon

The Moragon Stela is a Spanish two-seat fixed-wing microlight aircraft designed and built Aeromoragan based at Casarrubios del Monte, Spain. The aircraft was supplied as complete or as a kit for amateur construction.

The Stela is a two-seat side-by-side high-wing braced monoplane with a composite structure. It has a fixed tricycle landing gear and can be powered by an 80 hp (60 kW) Jabiru 2200 engine or a Rotax 912 or 912S.

== Aeromarmi Stella M1 ==
The Aeromarmi Stella M1 was a light plane made under license in Mexico by Aeromarmi since 2006. It was powered by a Jabiru 3300 flat six piston engine and a Sensenich series Z propeller. However, the few sales and the elimination of the airworthiness certification by the DGAC forced the Mexican company to stop manufacturing the aircraft in 2010.

== Specifications ==
Data from Certificado de aeronavegavilidad de tipo N°249, Aeromarmi

General characteristics

Performance

General characteristics	Moragon Stela	Aeromarmi Stela M1
Crew	1	1
Capacity	1 passenger	1 passenger
length	6.5 m (21 ft 4 in)	6.6 m (21 ft 8 in)
Wingspan	10 m (32 ft 10 in)	9.7 m (31 ft 10 in)
Height	2.4 m (7 ft 10 in)	2.5 m (8 ft 2 in)
Empty weight	260 kg (570 lb)	360 kg (790 lb)
Max takeoff weight	450 kg (990 lb)	650 kg (1,430 lb)
Fuel capacity	70 lt (18.49 U.S. gal; 15.4 U.K. gal)	100 lt (26.4 U.S. gal; 19.99 U.K. gal)
Powerplant	1 × Jabiru 2200 4-cylinder air-cooled boxer piston engine, 60 kW (80 hp) @ 3,300 rpm	1 × Jabiru 3300 6-cylinder air-cooled rboxer piston engine, 89.5 kW (120.0 hp) @ 3,300 rpm
Propeller	2-bladed Batalla fixed pitch, 58 inches	2-bladed Sensenich Series Z variable pitch, 64 inches
Performance		
Maximum speed	160 kilometres per hour (99 mph; 86 kn)	217 kilometres per hour (135 mph; 117 kn)
Cruise speed	140 kilometres per hour (87 mph; 76 kn)	170 kilometres per hour (110 mph; 92 kn)
Stall speed	55 kilometres per hour (34 mph; 30 kn)	69 kilometres per hour (43 mph; 37 kn)
Range	n.a.	610 km (380 mi; 330 nmi)
Rate of climb	n.a.	4.4 m/s (880 ft/min)
