= Thruster T600 Sprint =

British ultralight aircraft

T600 Sprint
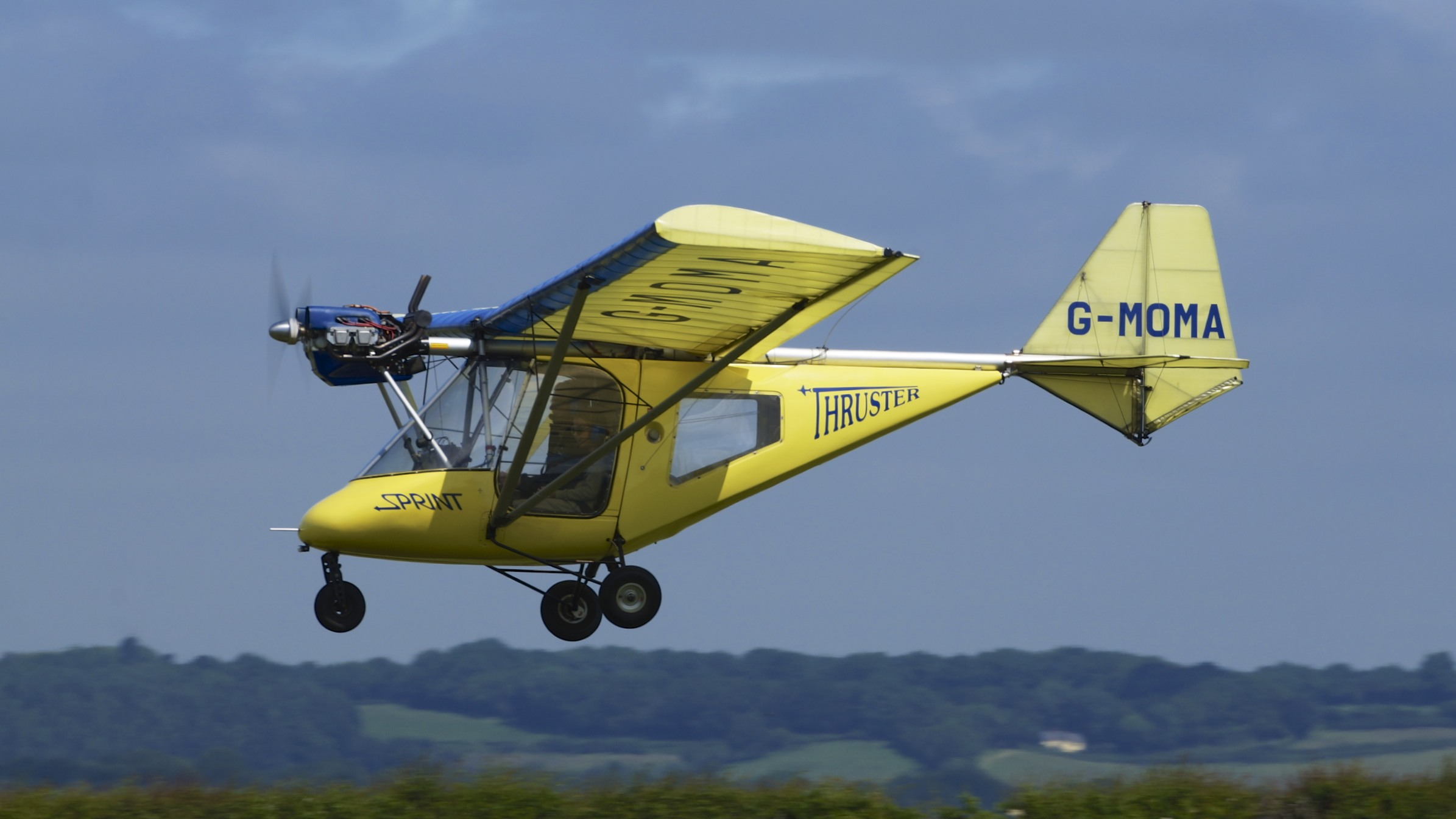

General information
- Type: Ultralight aircraft
- National origin: United Kingdom
- Manufacturer: Thruster Air Services

History
- Manufactured: 1997-2012
- Introduction date: mid-1990s

The Thruster T600 Sprint is a British ultralight aircraft, designed and produced by Thruster Air Services of Langworth, Lincolnshire and introduced in the mid-1990s. The aircraft is supplied as a complete ready-to-fly-aircraft.

== Design and development ==
The aircraft complies with the Fédération Aéronautique Internationale microlight rules and UK certified under BCAR Section "S". It features a strut-braced high-wing, a two-seats-in-side-by-side configuration enclosed cockpit accessed via doors, fixed tricycle landing gear or conventional landing gear and a single engine in tractor configuration.

The aircraft is made from bolted-together aluminum tubing, with its flying surfaces covered in treated Dacron sailcloth and a fibreglass cockpit fairing. Fittings and mounts are 316 stainless steel and 4130 steel. Its 9.60 m (31.5 ft) span wing has an area of 15.70 m^{2} (169.0 sq ft) and flaps. The engine is mounted on the keel tube, above the cockpit. Standard engines available are the 64 hp (48 kW) Rotax 582 two-stroke and the 85 hp (63 kW) Jabiru 2200 four-stroke powerplant.

== Variants ==
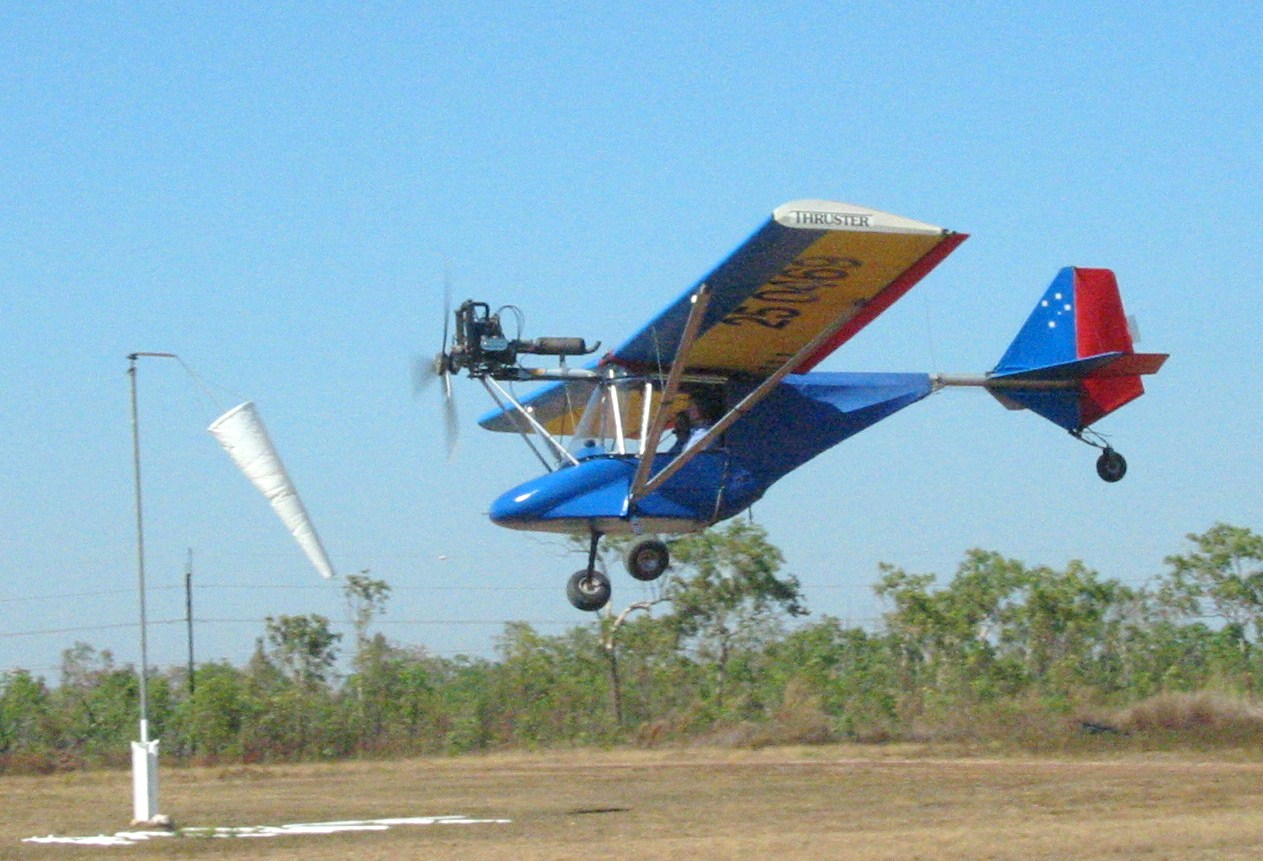
T600T tailwheel version

T600N
Nose wheel version
T600T
Tailwheel version

== Specifications (T600 Sprint) ==
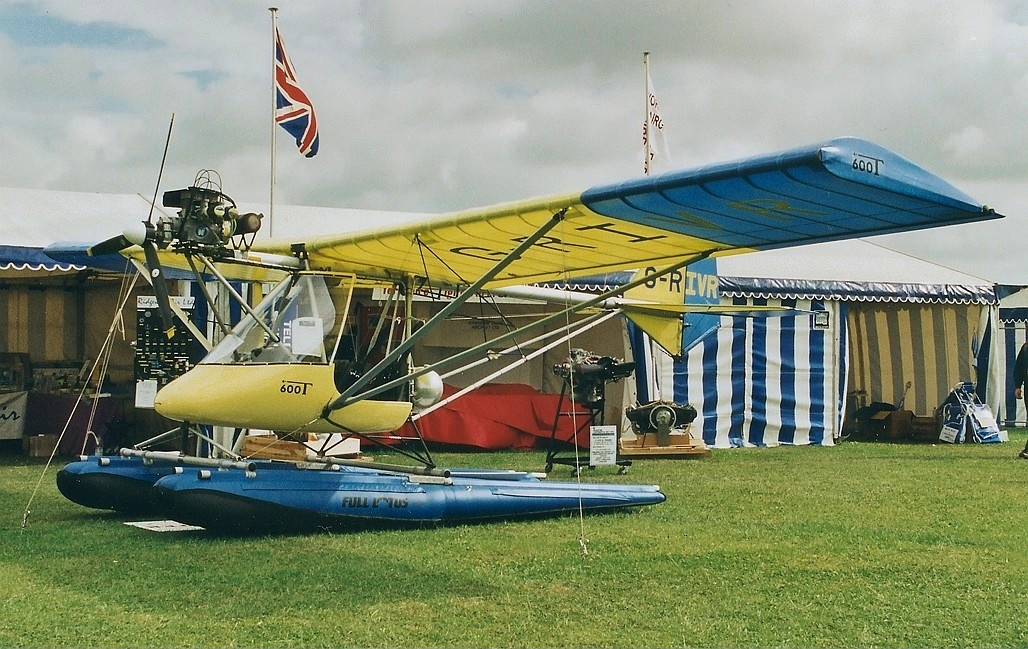
T600 on floats

Data from Bayerl and Thruster Air Services

General characteristics

- Crew: one
- Capacity: one passenger
- Length: 5.8 m (19 ft 0 in)
- Wingspan: 9.6 m (31 ft 6 in)
- Height: 2.4 m (7 ft 10 in)
- Wing area: 15.70 m^{2} (169.0 sq ft)
- Empty weight: 197 kg (434 lb)
- Gross weight: 450 kg (992 lb)
- Fuel capacity: 50 litres (11 imp gal; 13 US gal)
- Powerplant: 1 × Rotax 582 two cylinder, liquid-cooled, two stroke aircraft engine with "E" gearbox, 48 kW (64 hp)
- Propellers: 2-bladed Warp Drive Inc composite

Performance

- Maximum speed: 140 km/h (87 mph, 76 kn)
- Cruise speed: 105 km/h (65 mph, 57 kn)
- Stall speed: 59 km/h (37 mph, 32 kn)
- Rate of climb: 4.5 m/s (890 ft/min)
- Wing loading: 28.67 kg/m^{2} (5.87 lb/sq ft)

== See also ==
Similar aircraft

- Raj Hamsa X-Air
