= Jabiru 2200 =

1990s Australian piston aircraft engine

2200
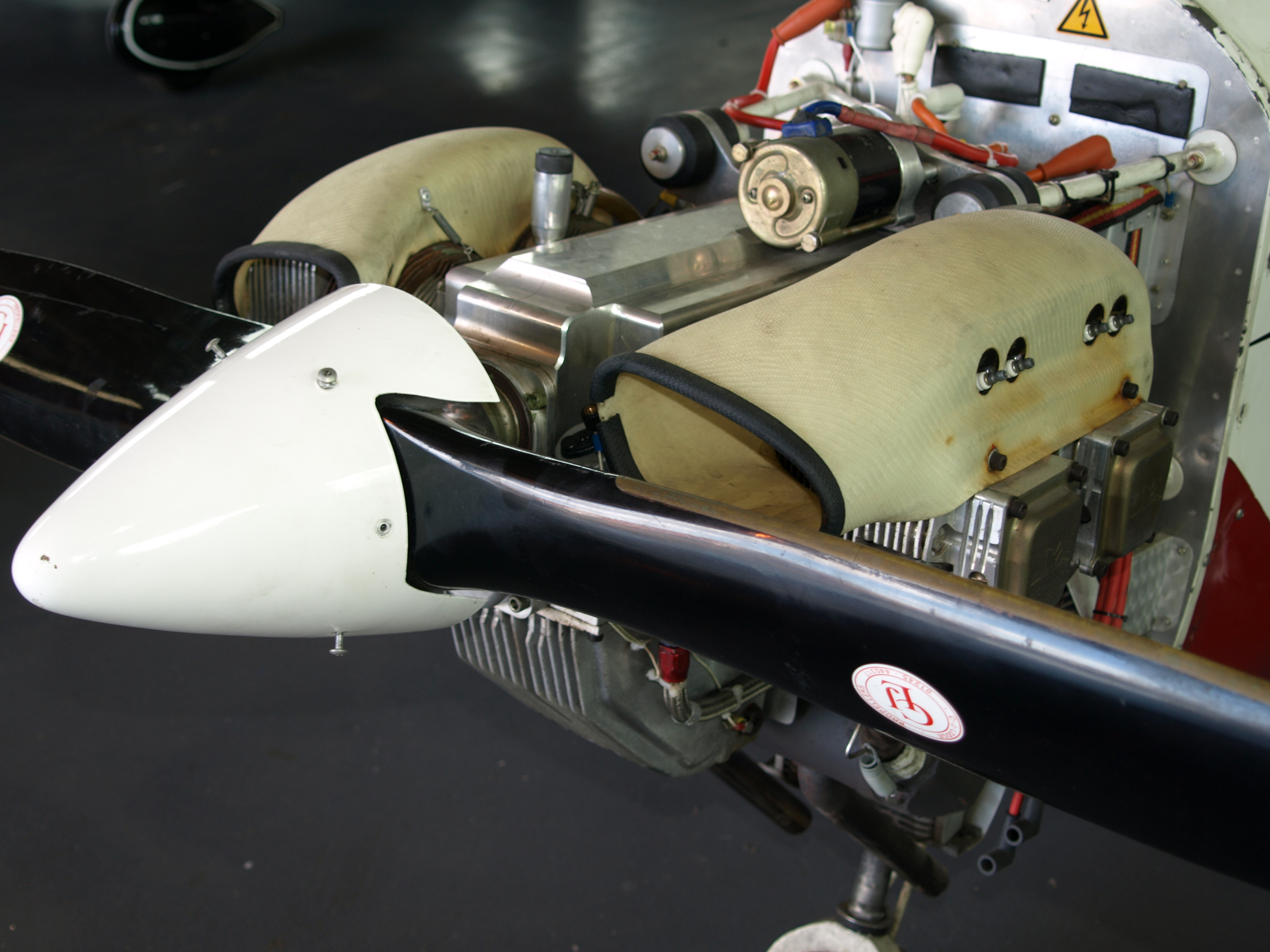
- Jabiru 2200 fitted to a Tipsy Nipper
- Type: Piston aero engine
- National origin: Australia
- Manufacturer: Jabiru Aircraft
- Developed into: Jabiru 3300

The Jabiru 2200 is a lightweight naturally aspirated, pushrod four-stroke, flat four, air-cooled aircraft engine produced by Jabiru Aircraft.

== Design and development ==
The conventional direct-drive engine is fitted with an alternator, silencers, vacuum pump drives and dual ignition systems as standard. The engine generates up to 60 kW (80 bhp) at 3,300 rpm.

In Europe the engine competes with the Rotax 912, another flat four four-stroke engine, but one that has water-cooled cylinder heads and a geared reduction drive to the propeller.

Jabiru Aircraft began as a builder of small two-seater aircraft in Bundaberg, Australia. It turned to producing its own engines when supplies of the Italian-sourced engines previously used dried up. Jabiru engines are designed to be manufactured in small batch quantities, so the firm uses CNC machines to mill major engine parts such as cylinder blocks and heads, rather than using cast items.

A larger variant of this engine is the flat-six Jabiru 3300 which, being of modular design, shares many parts with the J2200.

In December 2010 the CEA-308, powered by the Jabiru 2200, set four FAI records for aircraft weighing less than 300 kg. It averaged 359 km/h; 194 kn (223 mph) for four runs over the 3-km low-altitude course and 327 km/h; 176 kn (203 mph) on a 100-km circuit.

== CASA restrictions ==
In November 2014 the Australian Civil Aviation Safety Authority (CASA) proposed restricting all Jabiru-powered aircraft to day-visual flight rules (VFR) only, without passengers or solo students and within gliding distance of a safe place to land due to the engine line's safety record. The final rule adopted somewhat softened the restrictions, allowing the carriage of passengers and students, but requiring them to sign an acknowledgement of risk before flying and restricting equipped aircraft to day VFR flight and within gliding distance of a safe place to land. Both the manufacturer and Recreational Aviation Australia (RA-Aus) opposed the restrictions as unnecessary and unwarranted. RA-Aus reported that it was supplied with only a fraction of CASA's source data – just a day before submissions closed – and that CASA seemed to have excluded all engine reliability data post-"early 2014".

As of July 1, 2016, these restrictions were lifted for "most Jabiru-powered aircraft in Australia. Stock Jabiru engines that are maintained in strict accordance with Jabiru service bulletins and maintenance instructions are no longer affected by the limitations, which were issued in late 2014."

== Applications ==
- 3Xtrim 3X55 Trener
- Aeroalcool Quasar
- Aerocomp VM-1 Esqual
- Aeropilot Legend 540
- Aero Synergie Jodel D20
- AirLony Skylane
- Albaviation D24 MagicOne
- Alpi Pioneer 200
- Alpi Pioneer 300
- Ameur Altania
- Anglin J6 Karatoo
- Árnason Global 3
- ARV Super2
- Aviakit Vega
- AV Leichtflugzeuge Vagabund
- BRM Argos
- Coavio DF 2000
- Distar UFM-13 Lambada
- Europa Classic
- Excalibur Aircraft Excalibur
- Flying K Sky Raider
- Fly Synthesis Storch
- Fly Synthesis Texan
- FMP Qualt 201
- Gidroplan Che-22 Korvet
- ICP Savannah
- InterPlane Skyboy
- Jabiru J160
- Jabiru J170
- Jodel D18
- JPM 03 Loiret
- Just Superstol
- Kolb Kolbra
- Lucas L11
- Micro Aviation B22 Bantam
- Masquito M80
- Moragon Stela
- Murphy Maverick
- Nexaer LS1
- Phantom II
- Phoenix Air Phoenix
- Piel CP-215 Pinocchio
- Plumb BGP-1
- Protoplane Ultra
- Pulsar Aircraft Pulsar
- Rand Robinson KR-2S
- Rainbow Cheetah
- Raj Hamsa Voyager
- Raj Hamsa X-Air
- Rans S-7 Courier
- Roko Aero NG4
- Thruster T600 Sprint
- Tiger Club Development Sherwood Ranger
- Tipsy Nipper
- Titan Tornado
- TMM Avia T-10 Avia-Tor
- ULBI Wild Thing
- Ultracraft Calypso
- Whisper Aircraft Whisper
- Zenith STOL CH 701

== Specifications ==
=== General characteristics ===
- Type: Flat-4
- Bore: 97.5 mm (3.84 in)
- Stroke: 74 mm (2.91 in)
- Displacement: 2,200 cm³ (134 in³)
- Length: 562 mm (22.12 in)
- Width: 582 mm (22.91 in)
- Height: 445 mm (17.54 in)
- Dry weight: 62.8 kg (138 lbs) with exhaust, carburetors, starter motor, alternator and ignition system

=== Components ===
- Fuel system: Mechanical fuel pump
- Fuel type: AVGAS 100/130 or Auto Gas 91 Octane Minimum
- Oil system: Wet sump
- Cooling system: Aircooled

=== Performance ===
- Power output: 60 kW (80 hp) at 3,300 RPM
- Compression ratio: 8:1
- Fuel consumption: 15 litres/h at 2,750 rpm (75% power)
- Power-to-weight ratio: 0.96 kW/kg

== See also ==
Related development

- Jabiru 3300

Comparable engines

- CAMit 2200
- D-Motor LF26
- HKS 700E
- KFM 112M
- Pegasus PAL 95
- Revmaster R-2300
- Rotax 912
- Sauer S 2200 UL
- Sauer S 2400 UL
- Sauer S 2100 ULT
- ULPower UL260i

Related lists

- List of aircraft engines
