= Spectra PV-10 Tango =

PV-10 Tango
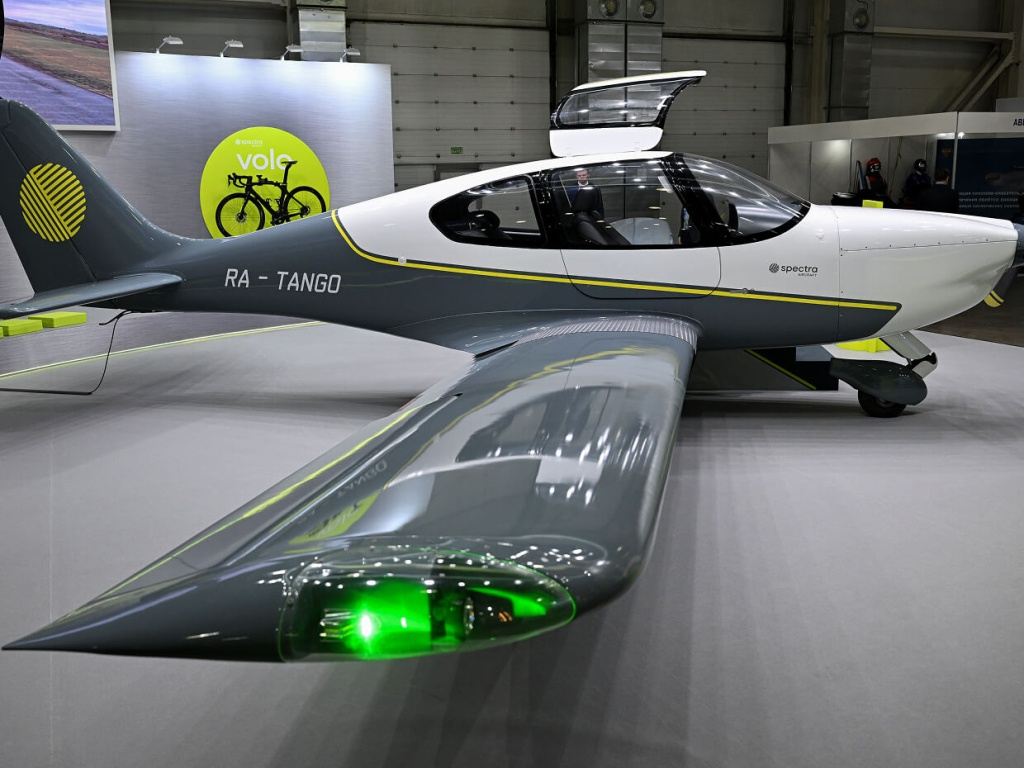
- Spectra PV-10 Tango mockup

General information
- Type: Civil utility aircraft
- National origin: Russia
- Manufacturer: Spectra Aircraft
- Designer: Spectra Aircraft, SibNIA
- Number built: 3

History
- First flight: 21 September 2024

The Spectra PV-10 Tango is a Russian four-seat, single-engine, low wing, fixed-wing aircraft made by Spectra Aircraft, a division of the S7 Group.

As of 2026, the PV-10 Tango is under development, with certification expected to be carried out later in the year, and serial production expected by 2027.

== Development ==
In an interview with the newspaper Izvestia, S7 Group founder Vladislav Filev announced the creation of a four-seater composite aircraft, as well as accompanying piston engine.

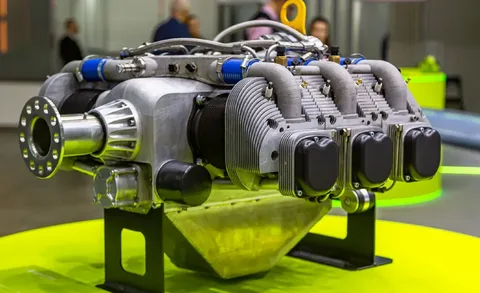
APD-520 Lider

On 21 September 2024, the first flight of a prototype Tango aircraft took place at the S7 Group's airfield at Torbeyevo, located south of Moscow. The flight was conducted by test pilot Vladimir Barsuk from the Chaplygin Siberian Scientific Research Institute Of Aviation (SibNIA). While the production APD-520 engine remains in development, a Belgian ULPower Aero Engines UL520iS was used as a substitute.

During the Innoprom-2025 exhibition in July 2025, Spectra Aircraft CEO Alexander Stepanov announced that operational tests were planned to be complete by the end of the year, with certification beginning in 2026.

On 24 December 2025 an updated prototype took flight, where performance and flight characteristics were checked. As a result of design optimisation, this aircraft had improved aerodynamic performance. It was further noted that testing of the APD-520 "Lider" engine was underway.

In February 2026, Vladislav Filev stated that the company was considering the establishment of additional production facilities in Siberia.

On 14 July 2026, the first flight of a Tango equipped with a domestically produced APD-520 engine took place, once again piloted by test pilot Vladimir Barsuk.

On 31 August 2026, a third prototype Tango made its first flight. The aircraft was equipped with an APD-520 engine, but differed from the previous aircraft by mounting a variable-pitch propeller.

In November 2026, Spectra Aircraft received formal certification from Rosaviatsiya as an aircraft developer. It was further reported that testing of the aircraft was underway, with flight time having exceeded 100 hours. Certification and the delivery of the first serial aircraft were expected in 2027.

== Specifications ==
Data from https://spectra-aircraft.ru/

General characteristics

- Crew: one
- Capacity: three passengers
- Empty weight: 750 kg (1,653 lb)
- Max takeoff weight: 1,200 kg (2,646 lb)
- Powerplant: 1 × APD-520 "Lider" six-cylinder four-stroke horizontally-opposed, 150 kW (200 hp)

Performance

- Cruise speed: 219 km/h (136 mph, 118 kn)
- Range: 1,375 km (854 mi, 742 nmi)
- Service ceiling: 4,000 m (13,000 ft)

== See also ==
- Cirrus SR22
- Ilyushin Il-103
