= Trixy Eye =

Austrian tandem-seat autogyro

Eye

General information
- Type: Military and police autogyro
- National origin: Austria
- Manufacturer: Trixy Aviation Products

History
- Manufactured: 100+
- Developed from: Trixy G 4-2 R

The Trixy Eye is an Austrian tandem-seat autogyro designed and built by Trixy Aviation Products intended for police and military operators for the observation and reconnaissance roles.

== Design ==
The Eye was developed from the Trixy G 4-2 R. It features a single main rotor, tricycle landing gear with wheel pants, a tail caster, 2 LED landing lights and 2 LED navigation and strobe lights on the cabin sides, a 152 hp (113 kW) Trixy 912 Ti or Rotax 912ULS engine in pusher configuration, and a pedal actuated main rotor pre-rotator to reduce the takeoff roll. An optionally heated cabin with removable canopy glass, UV-protected canopy and windshield and a defroster fan built into the instruments panel provide climate control.

The aircraft's fuel and electrical system are redundant and alternative battery and mechanical instruments are provided. Fuel is stored in two M.E.Rin anti-explosion tanks. The rear seat can be fitted with simplified controls to emergency use and Kevlar armour is optional.

An auxiliary fuel tank or a parachute drop box may be optionally installed under the cabin.

The Trixy Eye can carry up to 25 kg (55 lb) in sensors and cameras, as the mount is close to the center of gravity.

== Operators ==
Egypt
Border security
Turkey
Ankara and Istanbul police

== Specifications ==
Data from , the About sheet cites a Trixy 912 TI engine and a 8,6m rotor but the technical data sheets especially notes that maximum speed, stall speed, service ceiling, rate of climb, take-off run and landing run are recorded with a Rotax 912ULS engine and a 8,4m rotor.

General characteristics

- Crew: one
- Capacity: one passenger
- Length: 49 m (160 ft 9 in)
- Width: 188 m (616 ft 10 in)
- Height: 28 m (91 ft 10 in)
- Airfoil: NACA 8-H-12
- Empty weight: 300 kg (661 lb)
- Max takeoff weight: 560 kg (1,235 lb)
- Fuel capacity: two M.E.Rin anti-explosion 34 litres (7.5 imp gal; 9.0 US gal) tanks for a total capacity of 68 litres (15 imp gal; 18 US gal)
- Powerplant: 1 × Trixy 912 TI turbocharged, intercooling, fuel injection,, 113 kW (152 hp)
- Powerplant: 1 × Rotax 912ULS four cylinder, liquid and air-cooled, four stroke aircraft engine, 75 kW (100 hp)
- Main rotor diameter: × 8.6 m (28 ft 3 in)
- Propellers: 3-bladed Neuform TXL3 constant speed propeller, 172 m (564 ft 4 in) diameter

Performance

- Maximum speed: 180 km/h (112 mph, 97 kn)
- Stall speed: 40 km/h (25 mph, 22 kn)
- Service ceiling: 3,700 m (12,000 ft)
- Rate of climb: 4 m/s (790 ft/min)
- Take-off run: 80–120 m (262–394 ft)
- Landing run: 0–20 m (0–66 ft)

== See also ==
- Celier CA-22
- Kamov A-7 - Soviet military autogyro used in the Winter War
- Lie Ying Falcon - Chinese autogyro used by PLA
