= Pegasus Aviation (disambiguation) =

Pegasus Aviation may refer to:

- Pegasus Aviation, UK ultralight trike manufacturer
- Pegasus Aviation Finance Company
- Pegasus Aviation (NZ) Ltd - an engine manufacturer, see Pegasus PAL 95
