= Shaanxi Baoji Special Vehicles Lie Ying Falcon =

Chinese autogyro

Falcon

General information
- Type: Autogyro
- National origin: China
- Manufacturer: Shaanxi Baoji Special Vehicles Manufacturing Company/ Shaanxi Bao He Defense Technology
- Designer: Wang Baohe; Shaanxi Baoji Special Vehicles Manufacturing Company; Nanjing University of Aeronautics and Astronautics
- Status: In production (2015)
- Primary user: People's Liberation Army

History
- First flight: 2011

The Shaanxi Baoji Special Vehicles Lie Ying (猎鹰, lit. "Falcon"), otherwise known as Falcon Strike Gyrocopter, is a Chinese autogyro that was designed and produced by the Shaanxi Baoji Special Vehicles Manufacturing Company of Baoji in Shaanxi province.

The manufacturer is a builder of armoured vehicles for police and military use and the aircraft was reportedly flying in 2015.

The aircraft gained media attention when it appears as part of 2019 China National Day military parade. Nicknamed "air tricycle". In 2022 the aircraft reportedly costs approximately 40,000 Chinese Yuan (approximately 5,500 USD).

== Design and development ==
The lead designer of the Falcon is Wang Baohe, who in 2010 introduced German rotorcraft research and technology to a joint research program by Shaanxi Baoji Special Vehicles and Nanjing University's Aeronautics and Astronautics department, the results of which led to the Falcon.

The Falcon was designed for police and military use as a surveillance aircraft. It features a single main rotor, a two-seats-in tandem open cockpit with a windshield, tricycle landing gear and a Rotax 914 engine in pusher configuration. The Rotax engine is an Austrian-made, four-cylinder, liquid- and air-cooled, four stroke turbocharged 115 hp (86 kW) unit.

The aircraft has a two-bladed rotor with a diameter of 8.4 m (27.6 ft). It has a typical empty weight of 290 kg (639 lb) and a gross weight of 560 kg (1,235 lb), giving a useful load of 270 kg (595 lb). With full fuel of 70 litres (15 imp gal; 18 US gal) the payload for the crew and mission equipment is 220 kg (485 lb).

The basic model of the aircraft is a two-seater. An upgraded three-seater version of the aircraft also exists. The three-seat variant feature a 135 hp (101 kW) engine, a larger fuel tank made from different materials, to give greater range, and allow the transportation of more cargo, as well as for parachuting operations.

The aircraft can be armed with anti-tank guided missiles. The two-seater version can carry four missiles on hardpoints.

== Specifications (Falcon) ==
Data from Tacke

General characteristics

- Crew: one
- Capacity: one passenger
- Empty weight: 290 kg (639 lb)
- Gross weight: 560 kg (1,235 lb)
- Fuel capacity: 70 litres (15 imp gal; 18 US gal)
- Powerplant: 1 × Rotax 914 four cylinder, liquid and air-cooled, four stroke turbocharged aircraft engine, 75 kW (100 hp)
- Main rotor diameter: 8.4 m (27 ft 7 in)
- Main rotor area: 55 m^{2} (590 sq ft)
- Propellers: 3-bladed composite

Performance

- Maximum speed: 180 km/h (110 mph, 97 kn)
- Cruise speed: 150 km/h (93 mph, 81 kn)
- Rate of climb: 2.5 m/s (490 ft/min)
- Disk loading: 10.2 kg/m^{2} (2.1 lb/sq ft)

== See also ==
- List of rotorcraft
- Celier CA-22
- Kamov A-7 – Autogyro armed with dumb rockets, bombs and machine guns
- Kayaba Ka-1 – Autogyro armed with depth charges
- Trixy Eye
