= Rokospol Via =

Czech ultralight aircraft

Via

General information
- Type: Ultralight aircraft and Light-sport aircraft
- National origin: Czech Republic
- Manufacturer: Rokospol Aviation
- Status: In production (2017)

History
- Introduction date: 2008

The Rokospol Via is a Czech ultralight and light-sport aircraft (LSA), designed and produced by Rokospol Aviation of Prague, introduced at the Prague airshow in 2008. The aircraft is supplied complete and ready-to-fly.

== Design and development ==
The Via was designed to comply with the Fédération Aéronautique Internationale microlight rules and US light-sport aircraft rules. It features a cantilever low-wing, an enclosed cockpit with two-seats-in-side-by-side configuration under a bubble canopy, fixed tricycle landing gear and a single engine in tractor configuration.

The aircraft is made from sheet aluminum. Its 8.13 m (26.7 ft) span wing employs a MS 316 airfoil at the wing root, transitioning to an MS 313 at the wing tip. The wing has an area of 10.5 m^{2} (113 sq ft) and mounts flaps. The cockpit is 130 cm (51 in) in width. Standard engines available are the 80 hp (60 kW) Rotax 912UL, the 100 hp (75 kW) Rotax 912ULS, the turbocharged 115 hp (86 kW) Rotax 914, 100 hp (75 kW) Continental O-200 and the 130 hp (97 kW) ULPower UL350i four-stroke powerplants.

As of March 2017, the design does not appear on the Federal Aviation Administration's list of approved special light-sport aircraft.

== Operational history ==
Reviewer Marino Boric described the design in a 2015 review saying, "the fuselage lines are very smooth and the aircraft looks elegant like a composite made aircraft."

== Variants ==
Via UL
Model for the European microlight category with smaller wings and a gross weight of 472.5 kg (1,042 lb)
Via LSA
Model for the LSA category with larger wings and a gross weight of 600 kg (1,323 lb)

== Specifications (Via UL) ==
Data from Tacke and manufacturer

General characteristics

- Crew: one
- Capacity: one passenger
- Length: 6.45 m (21 ft 2 in)
- Wingspan: 8.13 m (26 ft 8 in)
- Height: 2.28 m (7 ft 6 in)
- Wing area: 10.5 m^{2} (113 sq ft)
- Airfoil: Wing root: MS 316; wing tip: MS 313
- Empty weight: 285 kg (628 lb)
- Gross weight: 472.5 kg (1,042 lb)
- Fuel capacity: 90 litres (20 imp gal; 24 US gal)
- Powerplant: 1 × Rotax 912ULS four cylinder, liquid and air-cooled, four stroke aircraft engine, 75 kW (101 hp)
- Propellers: 3-bladed composite

Performance

- Maximum speed: 240 km/h (150 mph, 130 kn)
- Stall speed: 54 km/h (34 mph, 29 kn)
- Never exceed speed: 243 km/h (151 mph, 131 kn)
- Wing loading: 45.0 kg/m^{2} (9.2 lb/sq ft)
