= Trixy Trixformer =

Austrian autogyro roadable aircraft

Trixformer

General information
- Type: Autogyro
- National origin: Austria
- Manufacturer: Trixy Aviation Products
- Status: In production (2017)

History
- First flight: March 2014

The Trixy Trixformer is an Austrian roadable aircraft autogyro/electric motorcycle designed and produced by Trixy Aviation Products of Dornbirn, introduced in 2014. The vehicle is supplied complete and ready-to-fly.

== Design and development ==
The Trixformer is based upon a two-wheeled electric motorcycle chassis as a land vehicle and is designed to add modular flying components. It can be equipped and flown as an autogyro, with the plug-in gyro module. Helicopter or fixed wing aircraft modules were under development in 2015.

As an autogyro, the Trixformer features a single main rotor, a two-seats-in tandem open cockpit with a windshield, tricycle landing gear, plus a tail caster and a four-cylinder, liquid and air-cooled, four stroke 130 hp (97 kW) Trixy 912 Ti engine in pusher configuration.

The aircraft fuselage is made from metal tubing and composites. Its two-bladed rotor has a diameter of 8.6 m (28.2 ft). The aircraft has a typical empty weight of 350 kg (772 lb) and a gross weight of 560 kg (1,235 lb), giving a useful load of 210 kg (463 lb). With full fuel of 80 litres (18 imp gal; 21 US gal) the payload for the pilot, passenger and baggage is 153 kg (337 lb).

Unlike many other autogyro builders Trixy Aviation uses a swash plate in its rotor head designs, rather than a tilt head. This makes the design more sensitive to fly and requires special type training.

== Specifications (Trixformer) ==
Data from Tacke

General characteristics

- Crew: one
- Capacity: one passenger
- Empty weight: 350 kg (772 lb)
- Gross weight: 560 kg (1,235 lb)
- Fuel capacity: 80 litres (18 imp gal; 21 US gal)
- Powerplant: 1 × Trixy 912 Ti four cylinder, liquid and air-cooled, four stroke aircraft engine, 97 kW (130 hp)
- Main rotor diameter: 8.6 m (28 ft 3 in)
- Main rotor area: 58 m^{2} (620 sq ft)
- Propellers: 3-bladed composite

Performance

- Maximum speed: 180 km/h (110 mph, 97 kn)
- Rate of climb: 5.6 m/s (1,100 ft/min)
- Disk loading: 9.7 kg/m^{2} (2.0 lb/sq ft)

== See also ==
- List of rotorcraft
