= Orel VH2 Streamline =

French ultralight aircraft

VH2 Streamline

General information
- Type: Ultralight aircraft
- National origin: France
- Manufacturer: Orel Aircraft by Topmodel
- Designer: Jean-Francois Boudet
- Status: Under development (2015)

History
- First flight: 2014

The Orel VH2 Streamline is a French ultralight aircraft that was designed by Jean-Francois Boudet and is under development by Orel Aircraft of Selles-Saint-Denis, introduced at the AERO Friedrichshafen show in 2015. The aircraft will be supplied complete and ready-to-fly.

== Design and development ==
The VH2 Streamline was designed to comply with the Fédération Aéronautique Internationale microlight rules. It features a cantilever low-wing, low-mounted tailplane, an enclosed cockpit with two-seats-in-side-by-side configuration under a bubble canopy, fixed tricycle landing gear and a single engine in tractor configuration.

The aircraft is made from carbon fibre. Its 9.0 m (29.5 ft) span elliptical wing has an area of 9.6 m^{2} (103 sq ft) and mounts flaps. It has an electrically-operated canopy and a side-stick controller. The cockpit width is 110 cm (43 in). The standard engine used is the 100 hp (75 kW) ULPower UL260i four-stroke powerplant.

As of 2015 the company was looking for a partner to bring the aircraft to production.

== Variants ==
VH2 Streamline
Model with fixed landing gear, 100 hp (75 kW) ULPower UL260i engine, 472.5 kg (1,042 lb) gross weight, first flown in 2014. To be sold complete and ready to fly.
VH2X Streamline
Proposed model with retractable landing gear, 200 hp (149 kW) engine, 650 kg (1,433 lb) gross weight, not yet flown. To be sold as a quick-build kit for amateur construction.

== Specifications (VH2 Streamline) ==
Data from Tacke and manufacturer

General characteristics

- Crew: one
- Capacity: one passenger
- Length: 6.05 m (19 ft 10 in)
- Wingspan: 9.0 m (29 ft 6 in)
- Height: 2.21 m (7 ft 3 in)
- Wing area: 9.6 m^{2} (103 sq ft)
- Aspect ratio: 8.44:1
- Empty weight: 290 kg (639 lb)
- Gross weight: 472.5 kg (1,042 lb)
- Fuel capacity: 100 litres (22 imp gal; 26 US gal) useable
- Powerplant: 1 × ULPower UL260i four cylinder, liquid and air-cooled, four stroke aircraft engine, 75 kW (101 hp)
- Propellers: 3-bladed carbon fibre

Performance

- Maximum speed: 295 km/h (183 mph, 159 kn)
- Cruise speed: 270 km/h (170 mph, 150 kn)
- Stall speed: 64 km/h (40 mph, 35 kn)
- Range: 1,260 km (780 mi, 680 nmi)
- Endurance: 4:42, plus 0:30 reserve
- Service ceiling: 4,400 m (14,500 ft)
- Rate of climb: 7 m/s (1,400 ft/min)
