= Trixy Aviation Products =

Austrian aircraft manufacturer

Trixy Aviation Products GmbH
- Company type: Gesellschaft mit beschränkter Haftung
- Industry: Aerospace
- Headquarters: Dornbirn, Austria
- Key people: CEO and Chief Engineer - Rainer Farrag
- Products: Autogyros
- Website: www.trixyaviation.com at the Wayback Machine (archived February 2, 2020)

Trixy Aviation Products GmbH is an Austrian aircraft manufacturer based in Dornbirn, that was founded by Rainer Farrag. The company specializes in the design and manufacture of autogyros.

== History ==
Trixy Aviation Products was founded in late 2010 with the aim of developing a roadable aircraft. Farrag recognized that most past roadable aircraft designs were not practical because they did not operate well on roads, due to the bulk of wings or rotors, parking problems, mechanical complexity and the high price tag associated with a dual use vehicle. Furthermore, one vehicle cannot fill all missions and aviation regulations restrict the operation of aircraft largely to airports, not permitting flying from residential driveways. Farrag's approach was instead his project TRIXYZ, an electric motorcycle that could be docked to create an airplane, autogyro, helicopter, wagon train or personal water craft. The first stage of this project was to create an autogyro design, designated the Trixy G 4-2 R (Gyrocopter for two, powered by Rotax). The company's roadable aircraft project is the modular Trixy Trixformer, which is an electric motorcycle and autogyro. The flying components are modular and can be swapped, with airplane and helicopter packages under development in 2015.

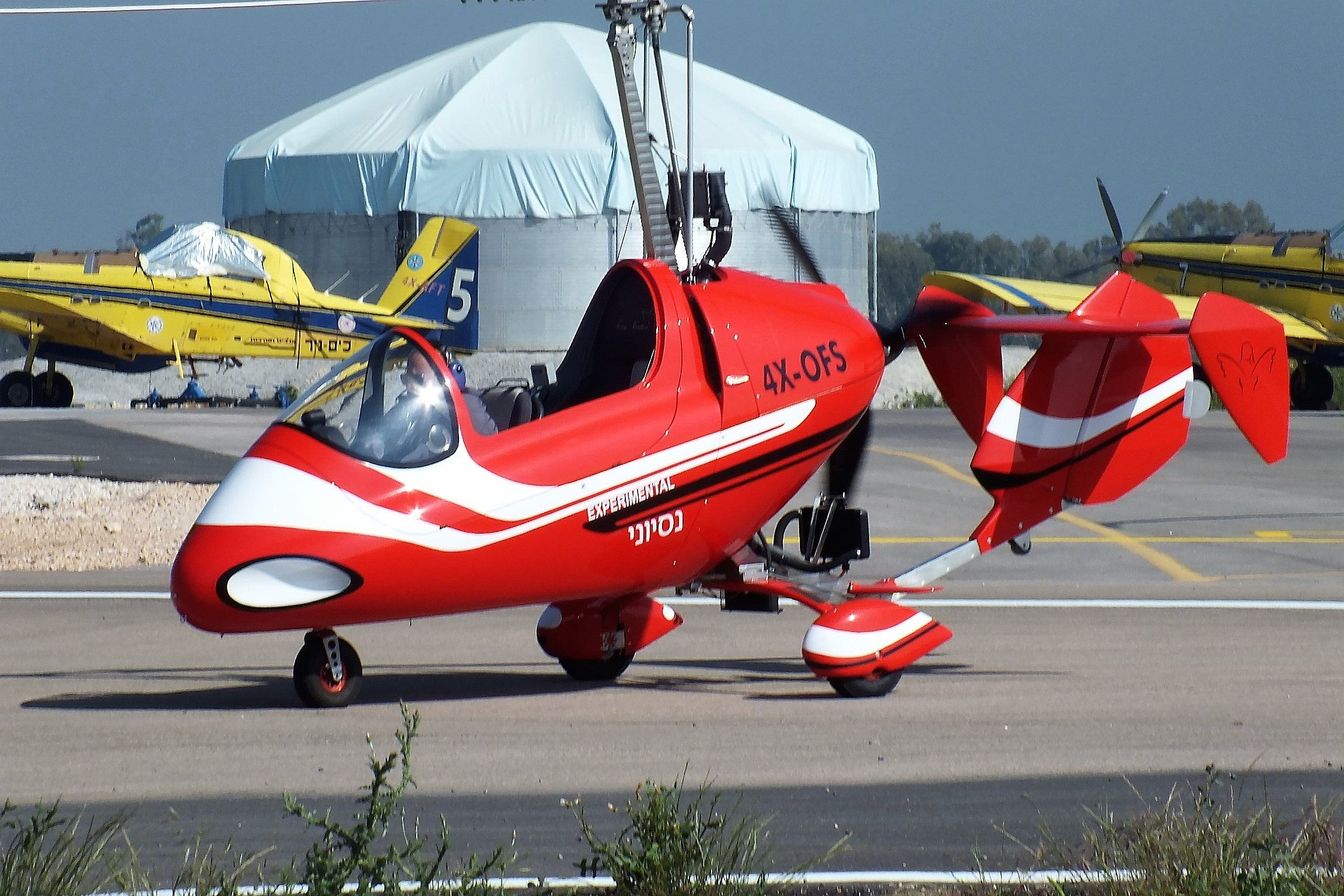
Trixy G 4-2 R

Farrag established Trixy Aviation Products as the research and development facility and Letalstvo Farrag d.o.o in Slovenia as the production facility.

Trixy Aviation Products first publicly exhibited at AERO Friedrichshafen in Germany in April 2011, showing its newly designed Trixy G 4-2 R. The autogyro was noted for its unusual anti-explosion fuel tanks and its full two year warranty.

The company exhibited the Trixy Zero motorcycle-style autogyro at AERO Friedrichshafen in April 2012, with the prototype first flying in June 2012.

== Aircraft ==
Summary of aircraft built by Trixy Aviation Products
Model name	First flight	Number built	Type
Trixy Eye		100+	Two seat optionally enclosed autogyro
Trixy G 4-2 R	2011		Two seat enclosed autogyro
Trixy Princess			Two seat enclosed autogyro
Trixy Liberty			Two seat open-cockpit autogyro
Trixy Trixformer	March 2014		Two seat roadable aircraft
Trixy Spirit			Two seat open-cockpit autogyro
Trixy Zero	2012		Two seat open-cockpit autogyro
