= Trixy G 4-2 R =

Austrian autogyro

G 4-2 R
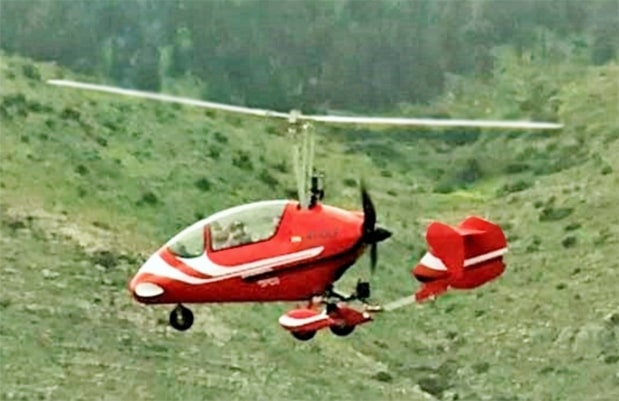

General information
- Type: Autogyro
- National origin: Austria
- Manufacturer: Trixy Aviation Products
- Status: Production completed

History
- Introduction date: 2011
- Variant: Trixy Princess
- Developed into: Trixy Eye

The Trixy G 4-2 R ("Gyro For Two powered by Rotax") is an Austrian autogyro, designed and produced by Trixy Aviation Products of Dornbirn. The aircraft was introduced at the Aero show held in Friedrichshafen in 2011 and when it was available it was supplied as a complete ready-to-fly-aircraft.

== Design and development ==
The G 4-2 R features a single main rotor, a two-seats-in tandem enclosed cockpit, tricycle landing gear and a four-cylinder, air and liquid-cooled, four-stroke, dual-ignition 100 hp (75 kW) Rotax 912S engine in pusher configuration. The 95 hp (71 kW) ULPower UL260i powerplant is optional.

The aircraft fuselage is made with a stainless steel tube frame; the cockpit is formed from carbon fibre. Its 8.4 m (27.6 ft) diameter two-bladed aluminium Averso rotor employs a NACA 8H12 airfoil and has a 1500-hour time between overhauls. For safety the 35 litres (7.7 imp gal; 9.2 US gal) fuel tank incorporates ME Rin anti-explosion technology. A second fuel tank of the same capacity can be optionally added. Baggage capacity is two 21 litres (4.6 imp gal; 5.5 US gal) compartments. The aircraft has an empty weight of 262 kg (578 lb) and a gross weight of 450 kg (992 lb), giving a useful load of 188 kg (414 lb).

Even though the manufacturer is an Austrian company the aircraft is built in Slovenia. The G 4-2 R was noted by Bayerl et al. in 2011 for its unusual new aircraft two-year warranty.

== Specifications (G 4-2 R) ==
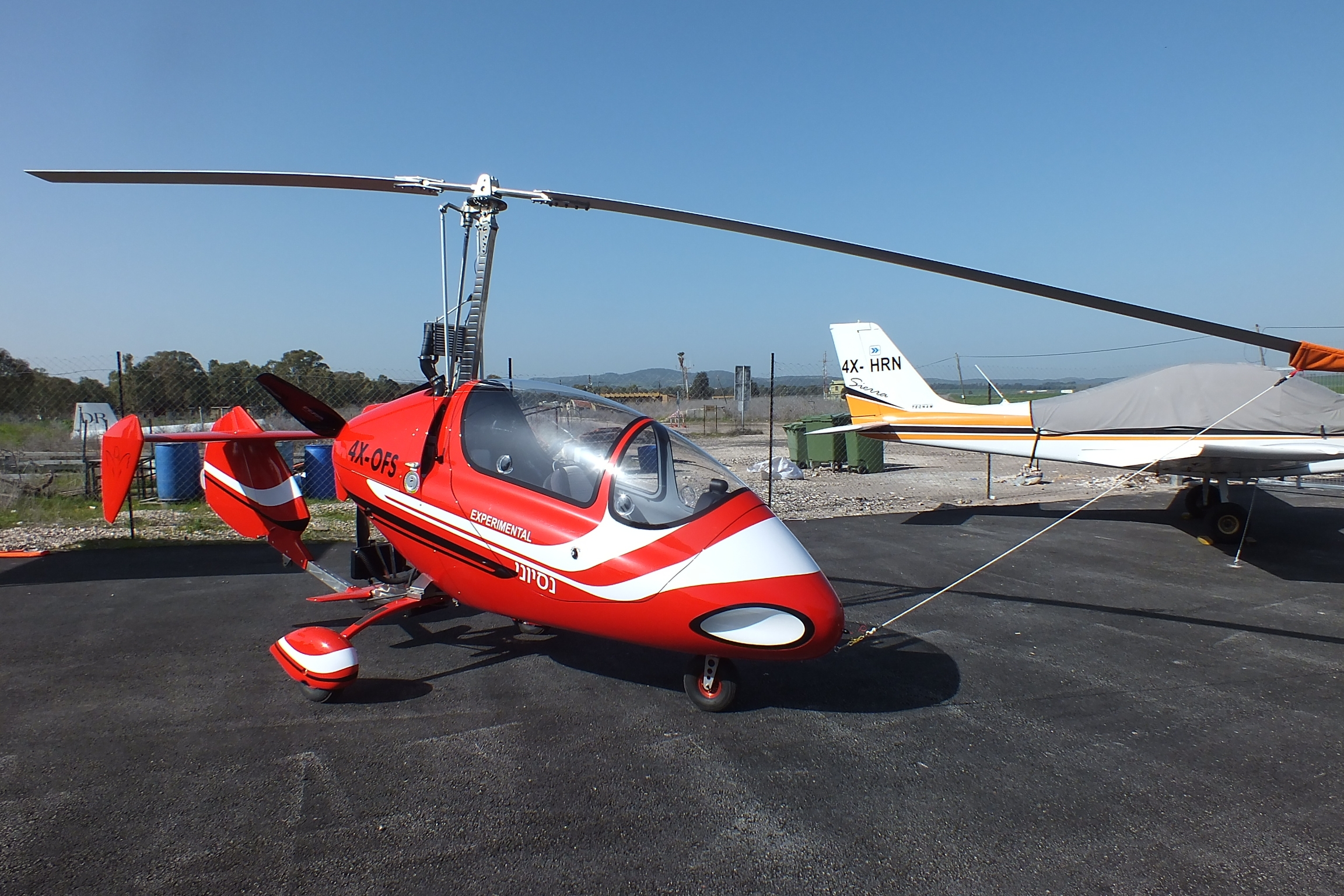
Trixy G 4-2 R

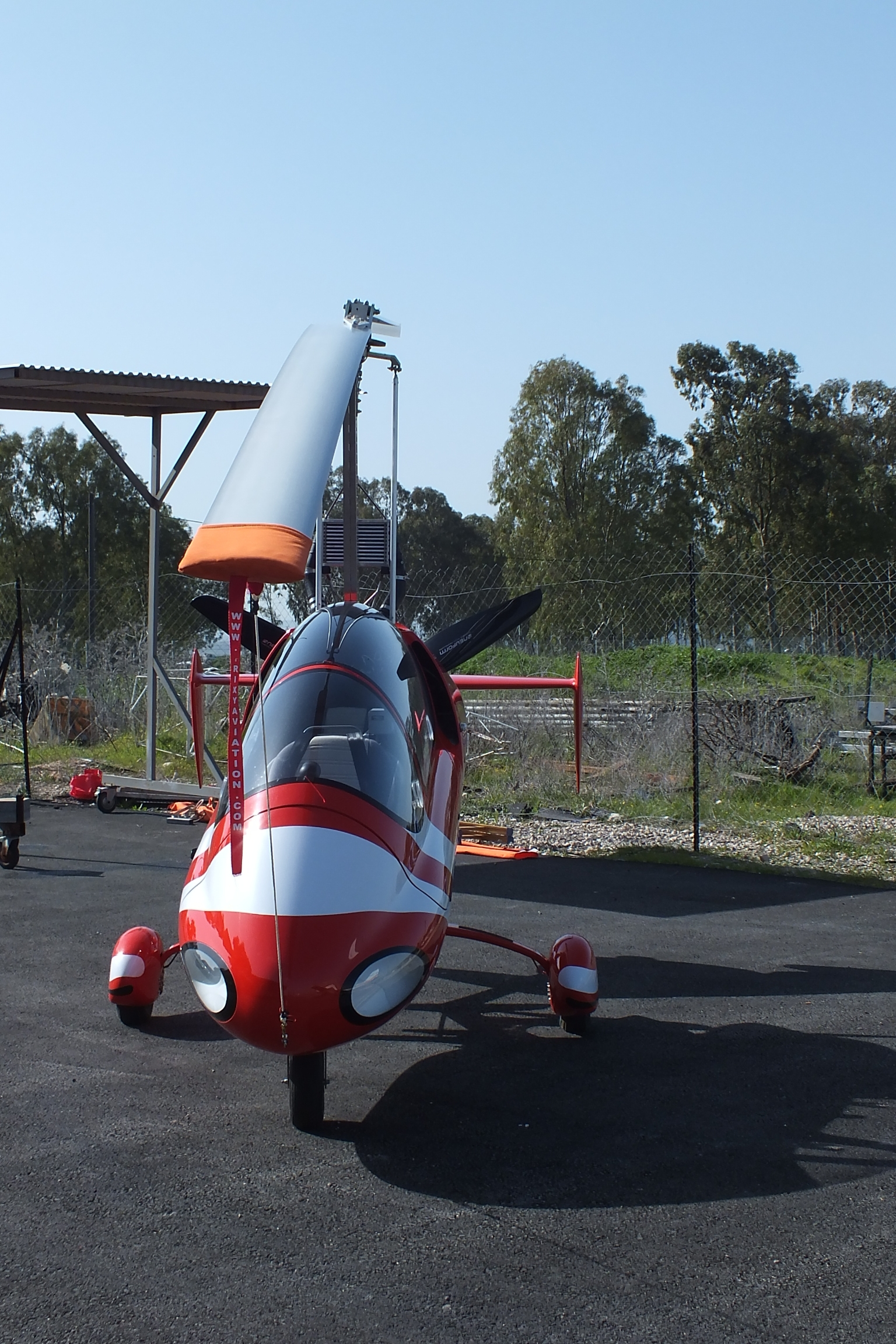
Trixy G 4-2 R

Data from Bayerl and Trixy

General characteristics

- Crew: one
- Capacity: one passenger
- Length: 4.90 m (16 ft 1 in)
- Width: 1.88 m (6 ft 2 in)
- Height: 2.80 m (9 ft 2 in)
- Airfoil: NACA 8H12
- Empty weight: 262 kg (578 lb)
- Gross weight: 450 kg (992 lb)
- Fuel capacity: 35 litres (7.7 imp gal; 9.2 US gal) standard, 70 litres (15 imp gal; 18 US gal) optional
- Powerplant: 1 × Rotax 912ULS four cylinder, liquid and air-cooled, four stroke aircraft engine, 75 kW (101 hp)
- Main rotor diameter: 8.4 m (27 ft 7 in)
- Propellers: 3-bladed Woodcomp constant speed propeller

Performance

- Maximum speed: 185 km/h (115 mph, 100 kn)
- Cruise speed: 160 km/h (99 mph, 86 kn)
- Service ceiling: 4,570 m (14,990 ft)
