= A2 CZ Ellipse Spirit =

Czech ultralight aircraft

Ellipse Spirit
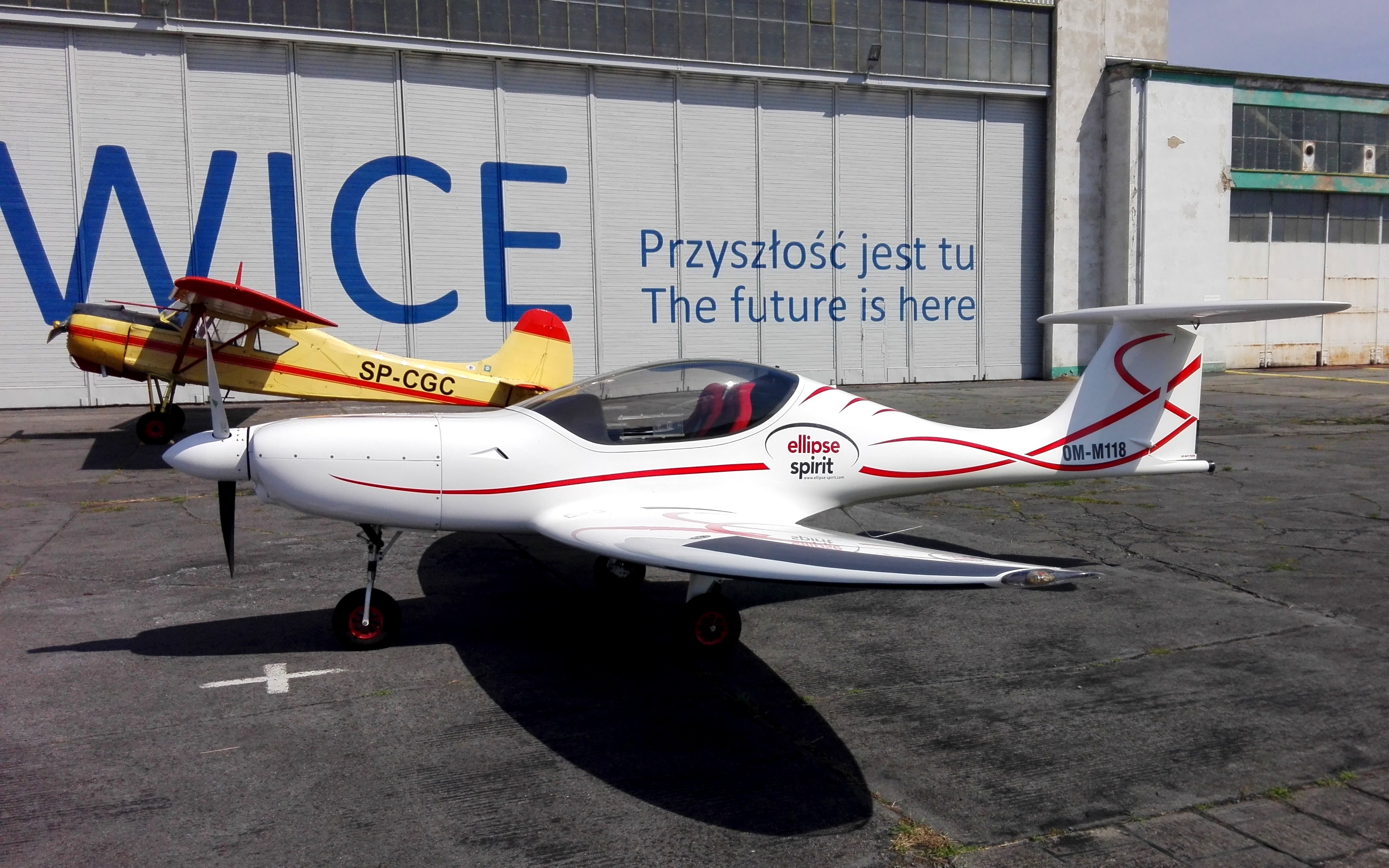

General information
- Type: Ultralight aircraft
- National origin: Czech Republic
- Manufacturer: A2 CZ
- Status: In production

History
- Introduction date: 2011
- First flight: July 2011

The A2 CZ Ellipse Spirit (sometimes spelled Elipse Spirit) is a Czech ultralight aircraft, designed and produced by A2 CZ. The aircraft was introduced at the Aero show in 2011 and is supplied complete and ready to fly or as a kit for amateur construction.

== Design and development ==
The aircraft was designed to comply with the Fédération Aéronautique Internationale rules. It features a cantilever low wing, a two seats in side-by-side configuration cockpit, tricycle landing gear and a single engine in tractor configuration.

The aircraft of all-composite construction. Its 8.0 m (26.2 ft) span elliptical wing employs rounded wingtips and fixed slots in the outer portion of the wing and dive brakes. Optional fuel capacity is 100 litres (22 imp gal; 26 US gal) giving a range of 1,730 km (1,075 mi). The standard engine is the ULPower 260iS four-cylinder, four-stroke aircraft engine of 107 hp (80 kW) and other engines available include the 100 hp (75 kW) Rotax 912S and 912iS, plus the 100 hp (75 kW) Lycoming IO-233.

The basic fixed gear Ellipse was undergoing development in 2011 into a retractable gear version as well as versions for the US light-sport aircraft category.

== Specifications (Ellipse Spirit) ==
Data from Bayerl

General characteristics

- Crew: one
- Capacity: one passenger
- Wingspan: 8.00 m (26 ft 3 in)
- Wing area: 8.48 m^{2} (91.3 sq ft)
- Empty weight: 272.5 kg (601 lb)
- Gross weight: 472.5 kg (1,042 lb)
- Fuel capacity: 100 litres (22 imp gal; 26 US gal)
- Powerplant: 1 × ULPower 260iS four cylinder, four stroke aircraft engine, 80 kW (107 hp)

Performance

- Maximum speed: 280 km/h (170 mph, 150 kn)
- Cruise speed: 250 km/h (160 mph, 130 kn)
- Stall speed: 60 km/h (37 mph, 32 kn)
- Rate of climb: 7.5 m/s (1,480 ft/min)
