= German Aircraft GmbH =

Former aircraft manufacture

- Company type: Former aircraft manufacturer
- Industry: Aerospace
- Headquarters: Germany
- Products: German Aircraft Sky-Maxx (formerly S.A.I. Aeronautica G97 Spotter)

German Aircraft GmbH is a former aircraft manufacturer. Its main product was the German Aircraft Sky-Maxx, formerly produced as the S.A.I. Aeronautica G97 Spotter, developed by Stephan Kohl. Kohl renamed his aircraft the Kohl Mythos (Greek for "legend" or "story") and put it into production himself under contract in Italy.
