= Trixy Liberty =

Liberty

General information
- Type: Autogyro
- National origin: Austria
- Manufacturer: Trixy Aviation Products
- Status: In production (2017)

The Trixy Liberty is an Austrian autogyro designed and produced by Trixy Aviation Products of Dornbirn. The aircraft is supplied complete and ready-to-fly.

== Design and development ==
The Liberty was designed as an entry-level, open cockpit gyroplane, although it has an optional cabin canopy enclosure. It features a single main rotor, a two-seats-in tandem open cockpit with a windshield, tricycle landing gear without wheel pants, plus a tail caster and a four-cylinder, liquid and air-cooled, four stroke 100 hp (75 kW) Rotax 912 or turbocharged 115 hp (86 kW) Rotax 914 engine in pusher configuration.

The aircraft fuselage is made from composites. Its two-bladed rotor has a diameter of 8.4 m (27.6 ft). The aircraft has a typical empty weight of 245 kg (540 lb) and a gross weight of 560 kg (1,235 lb), giving a useful load of 315 kg (694 lb).

Unlike many other autogyro builders, Trixy Aviation uses a swash plate in its rotor head designs, rather than a tilt head. This makes the design more sensitive to fly and requires special type training.

== Specifications (Liberty) ==
Data from Tacke and manufacturer

General characteristics

- Crew: one
- Capacity: one passenger
- Length: 4.9 m (16 ft 1 in)
- Width: 1.88 m (6 ft 2 in)
- Height: 2.8 m (9 ft 2 in)
- Powerplant: 1 × Rotax 912ULS four cylinder, liquid and air-cooled, four stroke aircraft engine, 75 kW (100 hp)
- Main rotor diameter: 8.4 m (27 ft 7 in)
- Main rotor area: 55 m^{2} (590 sq ft)
- Propellers: 3-bladed composite

Performance

- Service ceiling: 2,400 m (8,000 ft)
- Rate of climb: 4 m/s (790 ft/min)
- Disk loading: 10.2 kg/m^{2} (2.1 lb/sq ft)

== See also ==
- List of rotorcraft
