= Partenavia Mosquito =

P.86 Mosquito

General information
- Type: Civil trainer
- Manufacturer: Partenavia
- Number built: 1

History
- First flight: 27 April 1986

The Partenavia P.86 Mosquito was a two-seat civil trainer aircraft first flown in Italy on 27 April 1986. It was a high-wing monoplane of pod-and-boom construction with tricycle undercarriage and a twin tail, that accommodated the student and instructor side-by-side.

In 1988, Partenavia created the Aviolight company as a joint venture with two other partners in order to produce the aircraft, with an initial series of 100 aircraft to be powered by a 56 kW (75 hp) Limbach L2000, with modifications to allow certification. Nothing came of it, and the prototype was the only example produced. Partenavia itself was declared bankrupt the same year.

== Specifications ==
General characteristics

- Crew: two, student and instructor
- Length: 6.54 m (21 ft 5 in)
- Wingspan: 10.00 m (32 ft 10 in)
- Height: 2.85 m (10 ft 4 in)
- Gross weight: 540 kg (1,190 lb)
- Powerplant: 1 × KFM 112M , 60 kW (46 hp)

Performance

- Maximum speed: 175 km/h (110 mph, 96 kn)
- Range: 655 km (408 mi, 355 nmi)
- Service ceiling: 4,000 m (13,100 ft)

== See also ==
Aircraft of comparable role, configuration, and era

- ARV Super2
- Robin ATL
