= ULPower UL260i =

UL260i
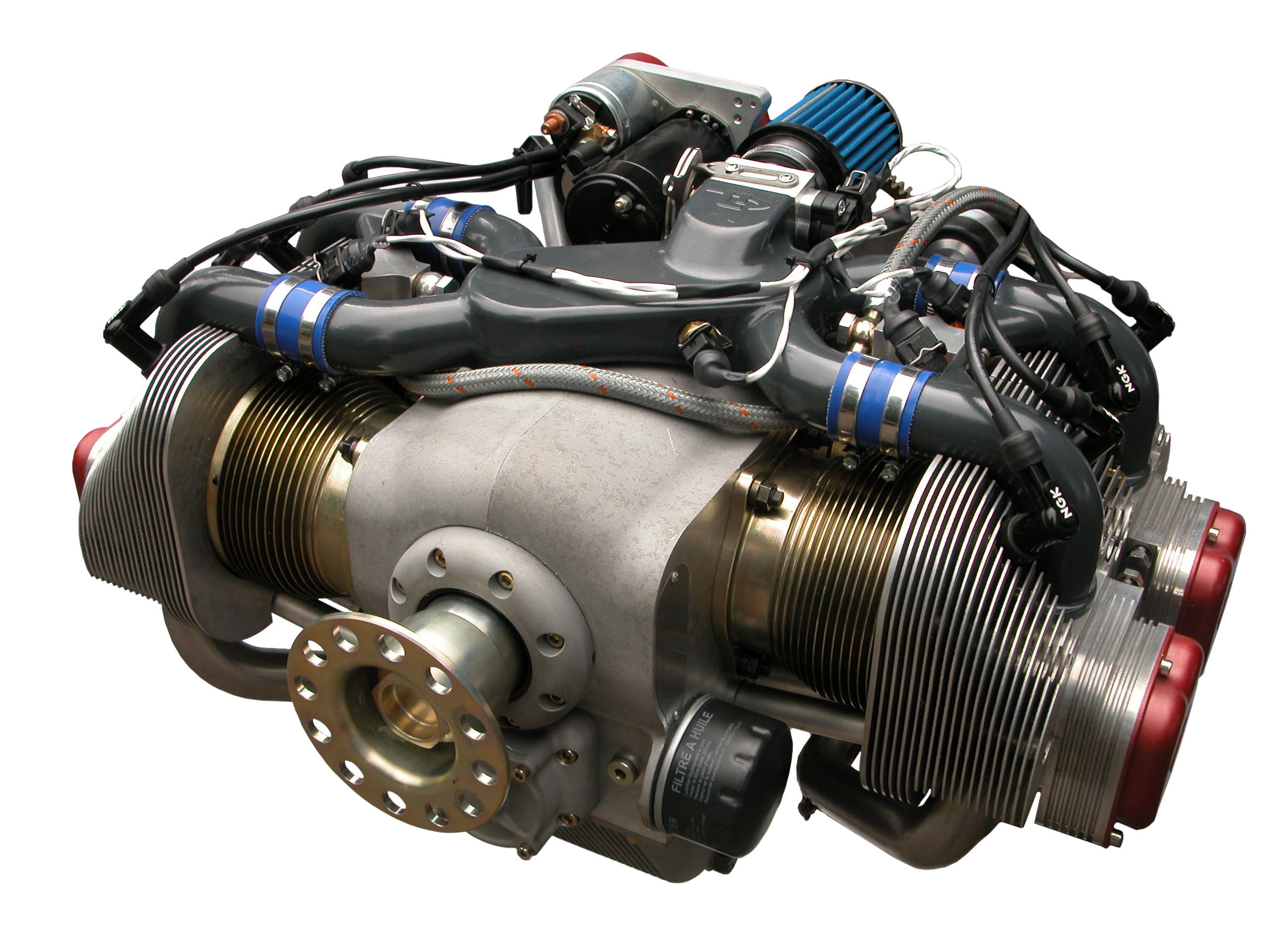
- Type: Piston aircraft engine
- Manufacturer: ULPower
- Major applications: Micro Aviation Bantam

The ULPower UL260i is a family of aircraft engines, produced by ULPower in Belgium.

== Design ==
The UL260i series are all lightweight, four-cylinder, four-stroke, horizontally-opposed, air-cooled, direct drive engine designs that feature FADEC with multipoint fuel injection and dual ignition systems.

== Variants ==
UL260i
Base model, fuel injection, compression ratio of 8.16:1, producing 97 hp (72 kW)
UL260iS
Model with a higher compression ratio of 9.10:1, fuel injection, producing 107 hp (80 kW)
UL260iSA
Aerobatic model with a higher compression ratio of 9.10:1, fuel injection, producing 107 hp (80 kW)
UL260iF
Model with a higher compression ratio of 9.10:1, fuel injection, producing 100 hp (75 kW), due to French regulatory requirements.

== Applications ==
- A2 CZ Elipse Spirit
- Flitzer Z-21
- Zenith STOL CH 701
- Zenair CH650
- Tecnam P92 Echo
- Aerocomp VM-1 Esqual
- BRM Aero Bristell
- Corvus Fusion
- Kohl Mythos
- Lanitz Escapade Two
- Micro Aviation Bantam
- Orel VH2 Streamline
- Reality Escapade UK
- Silence Twister
- Sonex Aircraft Onex
- Trixy G 4-2 R

== Specifications ==
Data from Tacke

=== General characteristics ===
- Type: Flat-4
- Bore: 106 mm (4.2 in)
- Stroke: 74 mm (2.9 in)
- Displacement: 2,592 cm^{3} (158.2 cu in)
- Length: 543 mm (21.4 in)
- Width: 654 mm (25.7 in)
- Height: 475 mm (18.7 in)
- Dry weight: 72 kg (159 lb)

=== Components ===
- Valvetrain: single central camshaft, solid lifters, pushrods, rockers and OHV
- Fuel system: dual electronic fuel injection
- Fuel type: Mogas (95 Oct.RON / 91 AKI min.) / AVGAS
- Oil system: Wet sump
- Cooling system: Air-cooled

=== Performance ===
- Power output: 95 hp (70.8 kW) at 3,300 RPM
- Compression ratio: 8.16:1

== See also ==
Related development

- ULPower UL350i

Lists

- List of aircraft engines

Comparable engines

- HKS 700E
- Jabiru 2200
- KFM 112M
- Pegasus PAL 95
- Revmaster R-2300
- Rotax 912
- Sauer S 2200 UL
- Sauer S 2400 UL
- Sauer S 2100 ULT
