= KFM 112M =

Four-cylinder horizontally opposed aircraft engine

- Type: Four-stroke aircraft engine
- National origin: Italy
- Manufacturer: Italian American Motor Engineering

The KFM 112M is a four-cylinder, four-stroke, dual ignition, horizontally opposed aircraft engine designed for ultralight aircraft and motor gliders.

The engine was designed and produced by the KFM (Komet Flight Motor) Aircraft Motors Division of Italian American Motor Engineering of Italy as a follow-on engine to their KFM 107 series and has been out of production since 1990.

== Development ==
The KFM 112 is a conventional four-cylinder engine that is very compact and lightweight at only 54 kg (119 lb), including the starter, alternator and carburetor. The engine features dual electronic ignition, a single OVC carburetor, hydraulic valve lifters, nickel-silicon treated cylinders and bi-metallic valves with chromed stems. It was offered without a reduction system. Starting is electric starter only.

The engine produces 62 hp (46 kW) at 3400 rpm for three minutes for take-off, 60 hp (45 kW) at 3200 rpm for five minutes and 54 hp (40 kW) at 3090 rpm continuous.

== Applications ==
- Partenavia P.86 Mosquito

== Specifications (112M) ==
Data from Black

=== General characteristics ===
- Type: Four-cylinder, horizontally opposed, four-stroke aircraft engine
- Bore: 90 mm (3.54 in)
- Stroke: 64 mm (2.52 in)
- Displacement: 1628.60 cc (99.38 cu in)
- Length: 583 mm (22.95 in)
- Width: 603 mm (23.74 in)
- Height: 380 mm (14.96 in)
- Dry weight: 54 kg (119 lb)

=== Components ===
- Fuel type: premium auto fuel or avgas
- Oil system: pressurized
- Cooling system: air-cooled
- Reduction gear: none

=== Performance ===
- Power output: 62 hp (46 kW) at 3400 rpm for three minutes for take-off, 60 hp (45 kW) at 3200 rpm for five minutes and 54 hp (40 kW) at 3090 rpm continuous
- Compression ratio: 9.5:1
- Fuel consumption: 16.3 L/h (4.3 US gal/h) at full power, 11.2 L/h (2.97 US gal/h) at 70% power.
- Specific fuel consumption: 212 g/(hp·h)(horsepower-hour) (0.46 lb/(hp·h)) at 90% power, 185 g/(hp·h) ((0.42 lb/(hp·h)) at 70% power
- Power-to-weight ratio: 0.90 kg/hp (1.98 lb/hp)

== See also ==
- List of aircraft engines
- KFM 107
- HKS 700E
- Jabiru 2200
- Pegasus PAL 95
- Rotax 912
- ULPower UL260i
