= Trixy Princess =

Austrian autogyro

Princess
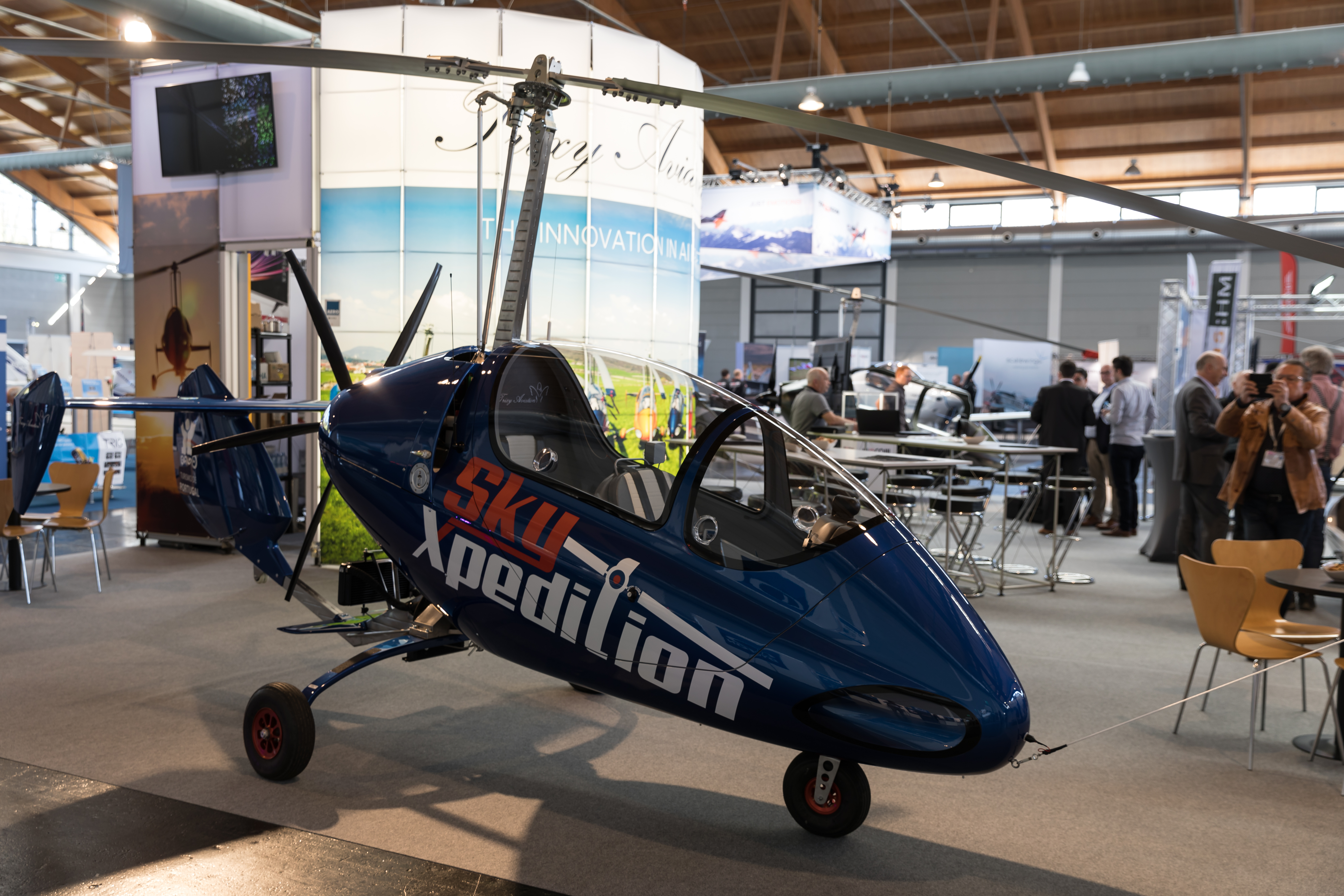

General information
- Type: Autogyro
- National origin: Austria
- Manufacturer: Trixy Aviation Products
- Status: In production (2017)

History
- Variant: Trixy G 4-2 R

The Trixy Princess is an Austrian autogyro designed and produced by Trixy Aviation Products of Dornbirn. The aircraft is supplied complete and ready-to-fly.

== Design and development ==
The Princess was derived from the Trixy G 4-2 R. It features a single main rotor, a two-seats-in tandem enclosed cockpit, tricycle landing gear with wheel pants, plus a tail caster and a four-cylinder, liquid and air-cooled, four stroke 100 hp (75 kW) Rotax 912 twin-cylinder or 130 hp (97 kW) Trixy 912 Ti engine in pusher configuration. A Mitsubishi turbocharged engine of 160 hp (119 kW) is also available. The Mitsubishi powerplant includes a main rotor prerotator capable of producing 280 rpm for takeoff, reducing the takeoff roll.

The aircraft fuselage is made from composites. Its two-bladed rotor has a diameter of 8.4 m (27.6 ft). The aircraft has a typical empty weight of 283 kg (624 lb) and a gross weight of 560 kg (1,235 lb), giving a useful load of 277 kg (611 lb). With full fuel of 68 litres (15 imp gal; 18 US gal) the payload for the pilot, passenger and baggage is 228 kg (503 lb).

Unlike many other autogyro builders Trixy Aviation uses a swash plate in its rotor head designs, rather than a tilt head. This makes the design more sensitive to fly and requires special type training.

== Specifications (Princess) ==
Data from Tacke and manufacturer

General characteristics

- Crew: one
- Capacity: one passenger
- Length: 4.9 m (16 ft 1 in)
- Width: 1.88 m (6 ft 2 in)
- Height: 2.8 m (9 ft 2 in)
- Empty weight: 283 kg (624 lb)
- Gross weight: 560 kg (1,235 lb)
- Fuel capacity: two 34 litres (7.5 imp gal; 9.0 US gal) tanks for a total capacity of 68 litres (15 imp gal; 18 US gal)
- Powerplant: 1 × Rotax 912ULS four cylinder, liquid and air-cooled, four stroke aircraft engine, 75 kW (100 hp)
- Main rotor diameter: 8.4 m (27 ft 7 in)
- Main rotor area: 55 m^{2} (590 sq ft)
- Propellers: 3-bladed composite

Performance

- Maximum speed: 155 km/h (96 mph, 84 kn)
- Service ceiling: 2,400 m (8,000 ft)
- Rate of climb: 4 m/s (790 ft/min)
- Disk loading: 10.2 kg/m^{2} (2.1 lb/sq ft)

== See also ==
- List of rotorcraft
