= Kohl Mythos =

German ultralight aircraft

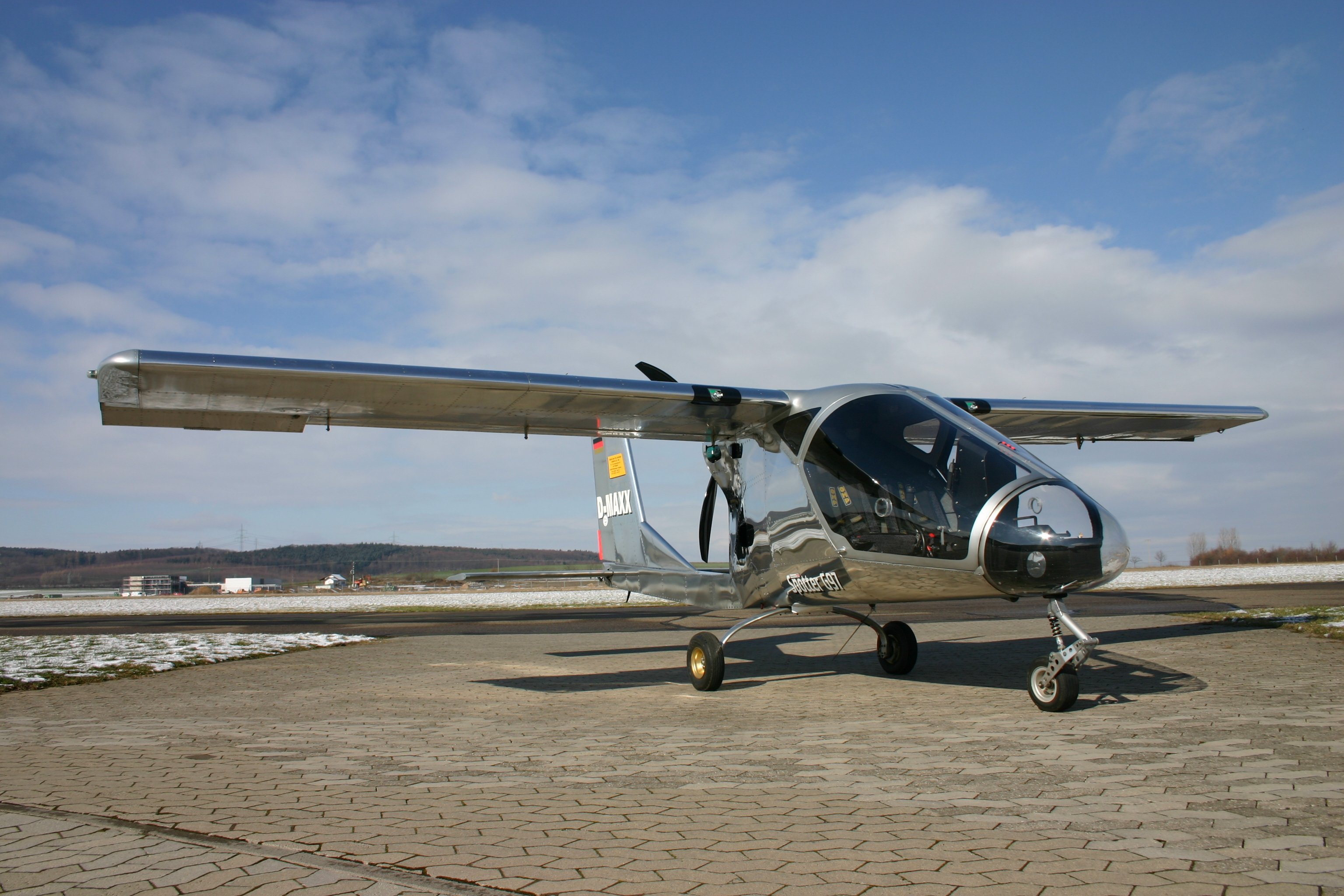
- German Aircraft Sky-Maxx

General information
- Type: Ultralight aircraft
- National origin: Germany
- Manufacturer: S.A.I. Aeronautica; German Aircraft GmbH; Officine Meccaniche Mingarelli
- Designer: Stefan Kohl
- Status: Production completed

The Kohl Mythos (myth or story) is a German observation ultralight aircraft, designed by Stefan Kohl, and produced by S.A.I. Aeronautica, later by German Aircraft GmbH and most recently by Officine Meccaniche Mingarelli (OMM). When it was available the aircraft is supplied as a kit for amateur construction or complete and ready-to-fly.

The Mythos started out as the S.A.I. Aeronautica G97 Spotter. Later, production was moved to German Aircraft GmbH and the design sold as the German Aircraft Sky-Maxx. After unsuccessful marketing, the designer decided to have the aircraft produced himself under contract in Italy by Officine Meccaniche Mingarelli and it was then sold as the OMM M-7 Servator.

The Mythos is intended for the observation role and in particular agricultural research, forestry, law enforcement, flight training, sightseeing, aerial photography and cattle mustering.

== Design and development ==
The aircraft was designed to comply with the Fédération Aéronautique Internationale microlight rules. It features a cantilever high-wing, a two-seats-in-side-by-side configuration enclosed cockpit, fixed tricycle landing gear and a single engine in pusher configuration. The aircraft has extensive glazing to allow maximum visibility.

The aircraft is made from aluminum sheet. Its 8.75 m (28.7 ft) span wing has an area of 10.3 m^{2} (111 sq ft) and mounts effective flaps to allow low-speed flight and loitering. Standard engines available are the 100 hp (75 kW) Rotax 912ULS and the 95 hp (71 kW) ULPower UL260i four-stroke powerplants.

OMM completed French and German ultralight certification in the middle of 2012. The company seems to have gone out of business in 2013, though.

== Operational history ==
Reviewer Marino Boric described the design in a 2015 review as having, "slow flying capabilities and excellent cockpit visibility that is among the best of all aircraft in its category especially with the legendary transparent nose section".

== Specifications (Mythos) ==
Data from Bayerl and Oxford Aircraft

General characteristics

- Crew: one
- Capacity: one passenger
- Length: 6.24 m (20 ft 6 in)
- Wingspan: 8.75 m (28 ft 8 in)
- Height: 2.3 m (7 ft 7 in)
- Wing area: 10.3 m^{2} (111 sq ft)
- Empty weight: 290 kg (639 lb)
- Gross weight: 450 kg (992 lb)
- Fuel capacity: 70 litres (15 imp gal; 18 US gal)
- Powerplant: 1 × Rotax 912ULS four cylinder, liquid and air-cooled, four stroke aircraft engine, 75 kW (101 hp)

Performance

- Maximum speed: 192 km/h (119 mph, 104 kn)
- Cruise speed: 170 km/h (110 mph, 92 kn)
- Stall speed: 63 km/h (39 mph, 34 kn)
- Never exceed speed: 240 km/h (150 mph, 130 kn)
- Service ceiling: 4,572 m (15,000 ft)
- g limits: +4.8/-2.5
- Rate of climb: 7 m/s (1,400 ft/min)
- Wing loading: 43.7 kg/m^{2} (9.0 lb/sq ft)
