= ULPower UL390i =

UL390i
- Type: Aircraft engine
- National origin: Belgium
- Manufacturer: ULPower

The ULPower UL390i is a Belgian aircraft engine, designed and produced by ULPower Aero Engines of Geluveld for use in homebuilt aircraft.

== Design and development ==
The engine is a six-cylinder four-stroke, horizontally-opposed, 3,888 cc (237.3 cu in) displacement, air-cooled, direct-drive, gasoline engine design. It employs dual electronic ignition and produces 140 to 160 hp (104 to 119 kW) at 3300 rpm.

== Variants ==
UL390i
Base model with fuel injection and a compression ratio of 8.2:1, producing 140 hp (104 kW) at 3300 rpm
UL390iS
Model with fuel injection and a 9.1:1 compression ratio, producing 160 hp (119 kW) at 3300 rpm
UL390iA
Inverted oil system version of the UL390iS, producing 160 hp (119 kW) at 3300 rpm

== Specifications (UL390i) ==
Data from Tacke and manufacturer

=== General characteristics ===
- Type: Six cylinder, four stroke aircraft engine
- Bore: 105.6 mm (4.2 in)
- Stroke: 74 mm (2.9 in)
- Displacement: 3,888 cc (237.3 cu in)
- Length: 723 mm (28.5 in)
- Width: 654 mm (25.7 in)
- Height: 472 mm (18.6 in)
- Dry weight: 100 kg (220.5 lb), ready to fly

=== Components ===
- Fuel system: fuel injection
- Fuel type: gasoline
- Cooling system: air
- Reduction gear: none

=== Performance ===
- Power output: 140 hp (104 kW) at 3300
- Compression ratio: 8.16:1

== See also ==
Aircraft of comparable role, configuration, and era

- CAMit 3300
- Jabiru 3300

Related lists

- List of aircraft engines
