= BRM Aero Bristell =

Czech ultralight aircraft

Bristell NG 5
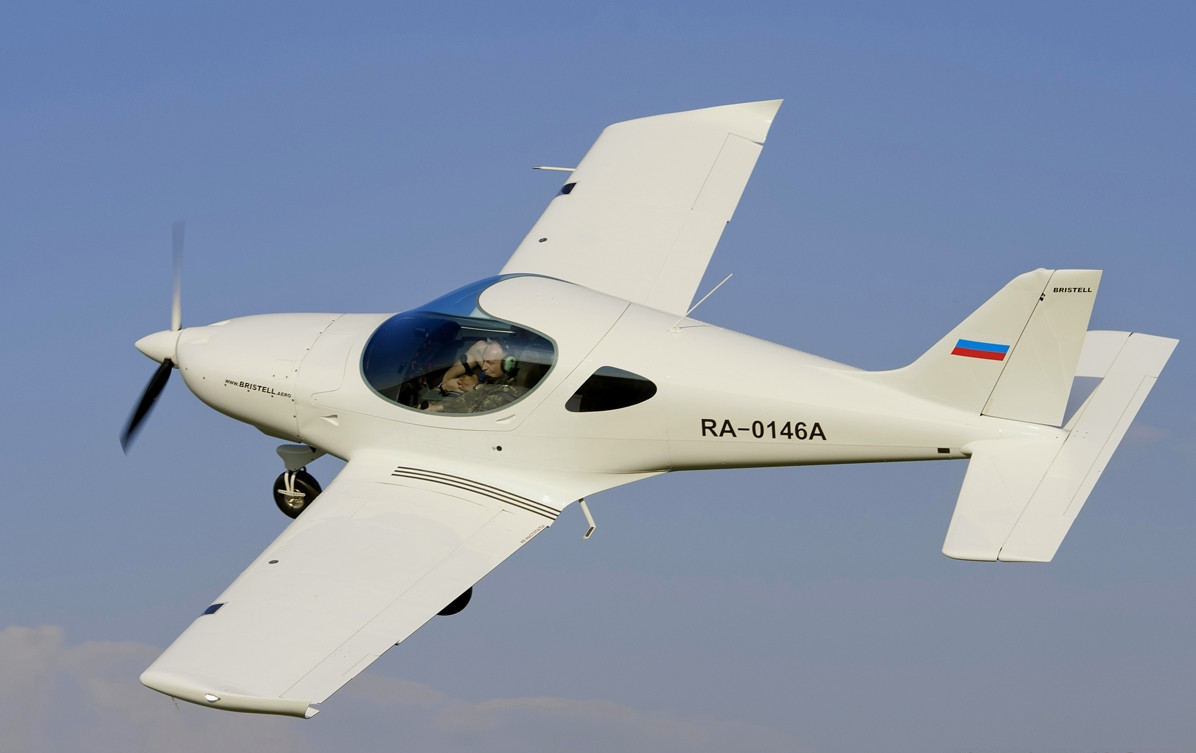

General information
- Type: Ultralight aircraft
- National origin: Czech Republic
- Manufacturer: BRM Aero
- Designer: Milan Bristela
- Status: In production
- Number built: 600+ (2020)

History
- Introduction date: 2010

The BRM Aero Bristell NG 5, now called the Bristell Classic, is a Czech low-wing, two-seat in side-by-side configuration, single engine in tractor configuration, ultralight and light-sport aircraft that was designed by Milan Bristela and is produced by BRM Aero. The aircraft is supplied as a complete ready-to-fly aircraft.

The aircraft was introduced at the AERO Friedrichshafen 2011 show, where the retractable gear version was shown.

== Design and development ==
The aircraft was designed to comply with both European microlight rules and also the US light-sport aircraft regulations, by using different versions for each regulatory environment.

The aircraft is made from aluminium and features a 130 cm (51 in) wide cabin at the shoulder, with a bubble canopy over the cockpit. The wings feature flaps. As of 2022, the available engine options were the 75 kW (101 hp) Rotax 912ULS, the 75 kW (101 hp) Rotax 912 iS Sport and the 106 kW (142 hp) Rotax 915 iS. Previous engines offered included the 60 kW (80 hp) Rotax 912UL, the 75 kW (101 hp) Rotax 912ULS, the 71 kW (95 hp) ULPower UL260i/iS, the 88 kW (118 hp) ULPower UL350iS, the 86 kW (115 hp) Rotax 914, 63.5 kW (85 hp) Jabiru 2200 and 89.5 kW (120 hp) Jabiru 3300 powerplants. The aircraft has a notably high useful load of 279 kg (615 lb). The landing gear is of tricycle configuration.

After 42 examples had been completed, the aircraft was introduced into the US market in September 2011 at the AOPA Summit. By 31 December 2020, the company reported over 600 had been delivered.

== Variants ==
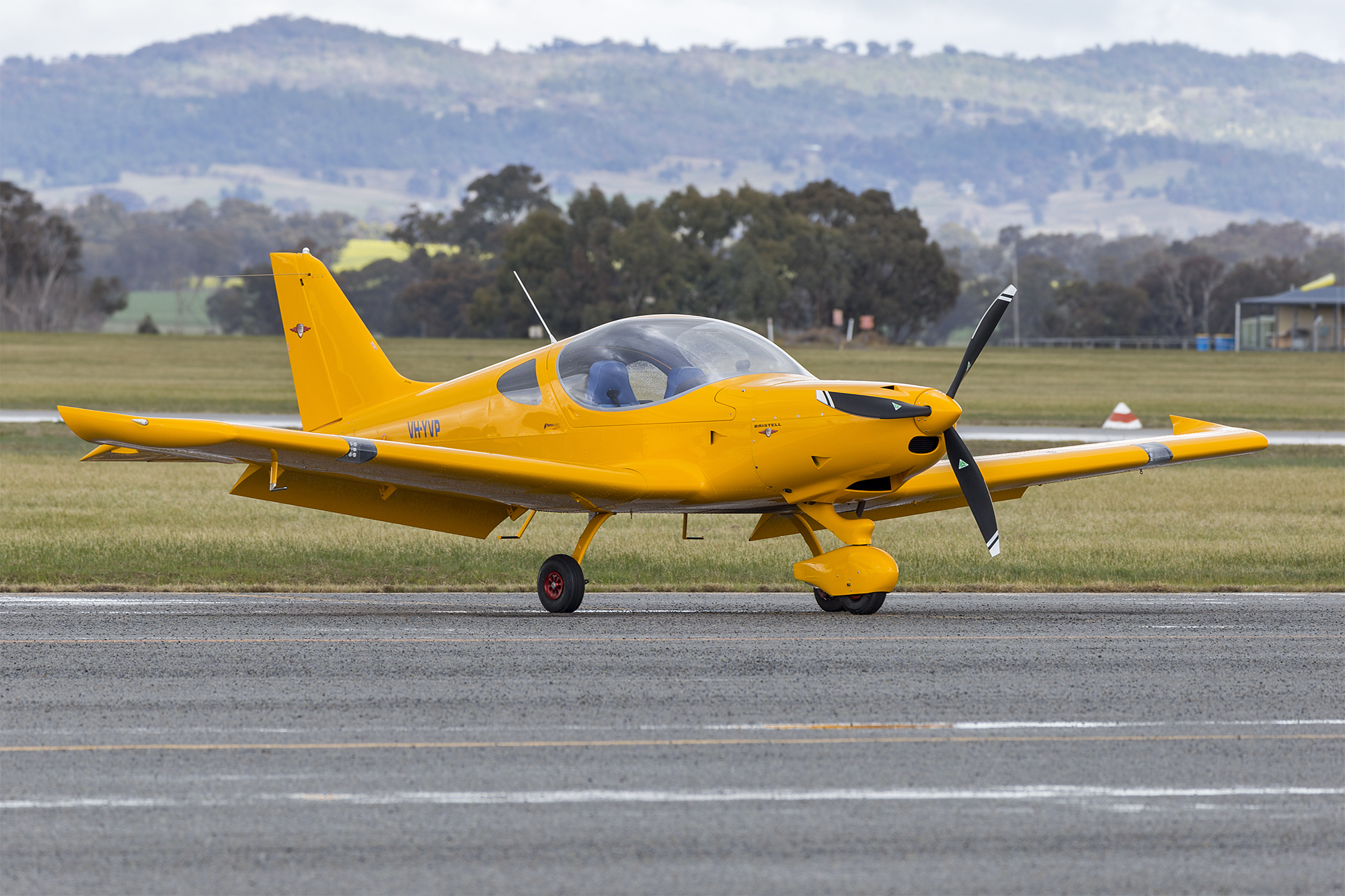
Bristell NG 5 LSA

Bristell NG 5 UL
Base ultralight model with an 8.13 m (26.7 ft) wingspan and a gross weight of 472.5 kg (1,042 lb).
Bristell NG 5 HD
Heavy duty model with an 8.13 m (26.7 ft) wingspan, heavier duty wing spars and a gross weight of 600 kg (1,323 lb).
Bristell NG 5 LSA
Model for the US light-sport aircraft category with an 9.13 m (30.0 ft) wingspan and a gross weight of 600 kg (1,323 lb).
Bristell NG 5 RG
Retractable gear model with an 9.13 m (30.0 ft) wingspan and a gross weight of 600 kg (1,323 lb).
Bristell NG 5 Speed Wing
Homebuilt variant supplied as a kit which can be completed with either tricycle or conventional landing gear and a choice of engine: Rotax 912S, Rotax 912ULS or Jabiru 3300A.

== Accidents and incidents ==
Bristell NG 5 has had a number of crashes and serious accidents, including fatal accidents.

=== Centre of gravity and spin accidents ===
In February 2020, the Australian Civil Aviation Safety Authority released a safety notice advising of a number of fatal accidents globally involving spins and stalls of Bristell LSAs. The safety notice states "aircraft may not meet the LSA standards as it does not appear to have been adequately tested" and that "the manufacturer has been unable to provide satisfactory evidence that the design is compliant with the requirements of the ASTM standards applicable to light sport aircraft." The company contested the CASA notice and claims that spin testing was conducted, although the manufacturer prohibits the design from intentional spins. CASA indicated on 28 February 2020 that "further investigation and discussions with the manufacturer are ongoing and CASA will provide an update as new information becomes available."

The Irish Air Accident Investigation Unit report in May 2022 on the crash of an NG 5 Speed Wing in June 2019, resulting in the death of the two occupants, and found that incorrect weight and balance information supplied by the manufacturer was a contributory factor to the crash and recommended that BRM Aero revise and enhance the operating guidelines for the aircraft.

On 21 June 2021 CASA issued a notice indicating that the manufacturer had provided data on spin testing and had also amended its weight and balance information provided to builders and owners, including changing the datum from the wing leading edge to the engine firewall. CASA indicated that the amended weight and balance limits and new datum adequately addressed the safety concerns previously raised and "provided operators of the aircraft only operate the aircraft in compliance with the corrected AOI data, CASA considers that the potential for inadvertent operation of the aircraft at or outside the centre of gravity limits is substantially reduced."

== Specifications (Bristell UL) ==
Data from AVweb and company website

General characteristics

- Crew: one
- Capacity: one passenger
- Length: 6.45 m (21 ft 2 in)
- Wingspan: 8.13 m (26 ft 8 in)
- Height: 2.28 m (7 ft 6 in)
- Wing area: 10.5 m^{2} (113 sq ft)
- Empty weight: 290 kg (639 lb)
- Gross weight: 472.5 kg (1,042 lb)
- Fuel capacity: 120 litres (26 imp gal; 32 US gal)
- Powerplant: 1 × Rotax 912ULS , 75 kW (100 hp)

Performance

- Cruise speed: 214 km/h (133 mph, 116 kn)
- Stall speed: 52 km/h (32 mph, 28 kn) flaps down
- Never exceed speed: 270 km/h (170 mph, 150 kn)
- g limits: +4/-2
- Wing loading: 45 kg/m^{2} (9.2 lb/sq ft)

== See also ==
Aircraft of comparable role, configuration, and era

- PiperSport - another aircraft from the same designer
- Evektor SportStar - another aircraft from the same designer
- Swiss Excellence Risen - another aircraft similar to the NG 5 RG version
