= ULPower UL350i =

UL350i
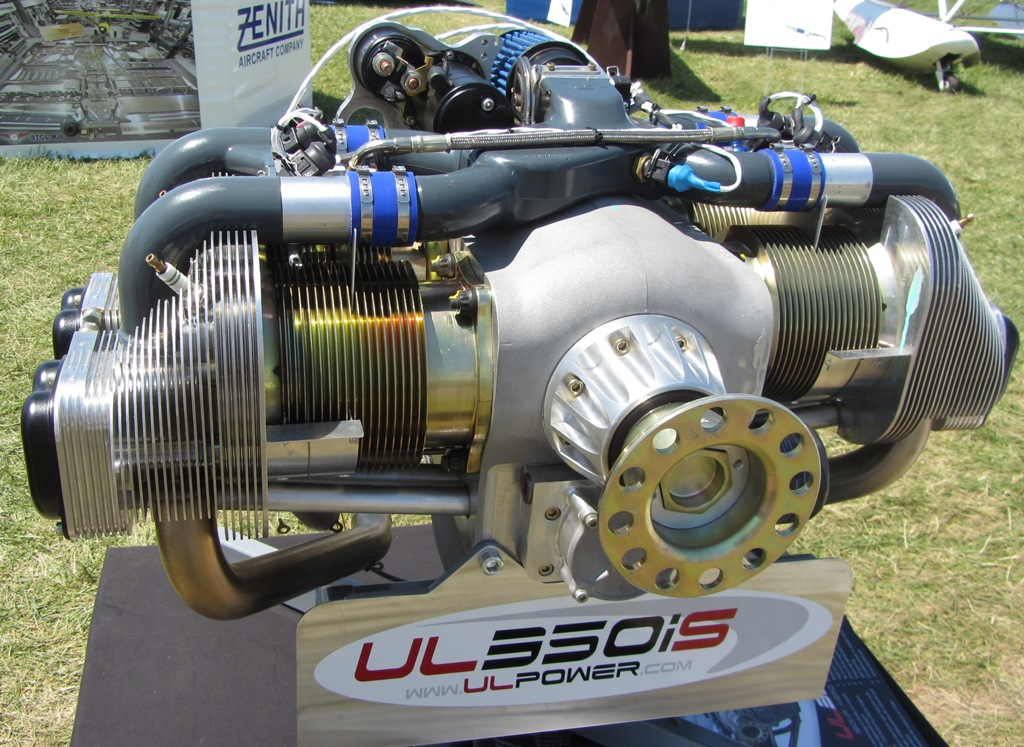
- Type: Aircraft engine
- National origin: Belgium
- Manufacturer: ULPower Aero Engines

The ULPower UL350i is a Belgian aircraft engine, designed and produced by ULPower Aero Engines of Geluveld for use in ultralight and homebuilt aircraft.

== Design and development ==
The engine is a four-cylinder, four-stroke, horizontally-opposed, 3,503 cc (213.8 cu in), air-cooled, direct drive, gasoline engine design. It employs dual electronic ignition, multi-point EFI and produces 118 hp (88 kW) at 3300 rpm.

== Variants ==
UL350i
Base model that produces 118 hp (88 kW) at 3300 rpm.
UL350iS
Higher compression model that produces 130 hp (97 kW) at 3300 rpm.
UL350iSA
Same as UL350iS but with inverted oil system for aerobatic use.
UL350iHPS
Special version for helicopter use. It produces 150 hp (112 kW) at 3500 rpm.

== Applications ==
- BRM Aero Bristell
- Rans S-20 Raven
- Rokospol Via

== Specifications (ULPower UL350i) ==
Data from World Directory of Leisure Aviation 2011-12 and manufacturer

=== General characteristics ===
- Type: Four cylinder, four stroke aircraft engine
- Bore: 105.6 mm (4.2 in)
- Stroke: 100 mm (3.9 in)
- Displacement: 3,503 cc (213.8 cu in)
- Length: 553 mm (21.8 in)
- Width: 735 mm (28.9 in)
- Height: 500 mm (19.7 in)
- Dry weight: 80 kg (176.4 lb)

=== Components ===
- Fuel type: Regular unleaded automotive gasoline, minimum 95 Octane RON (87 MON = 91 AKI) or 100LL avgas may be used
- Cooling system: air

=== Performance ===
- Power output: 118 hp (88 kW) at 3300 rpm
- Compression ratio: 8.0:1 and 8.7:1 (S versions)

== See also ==
Related development

- ULPower UL260i

Related lists

- List of aircraft engines
