= CAMit 3300 =

Australian aircraft engine

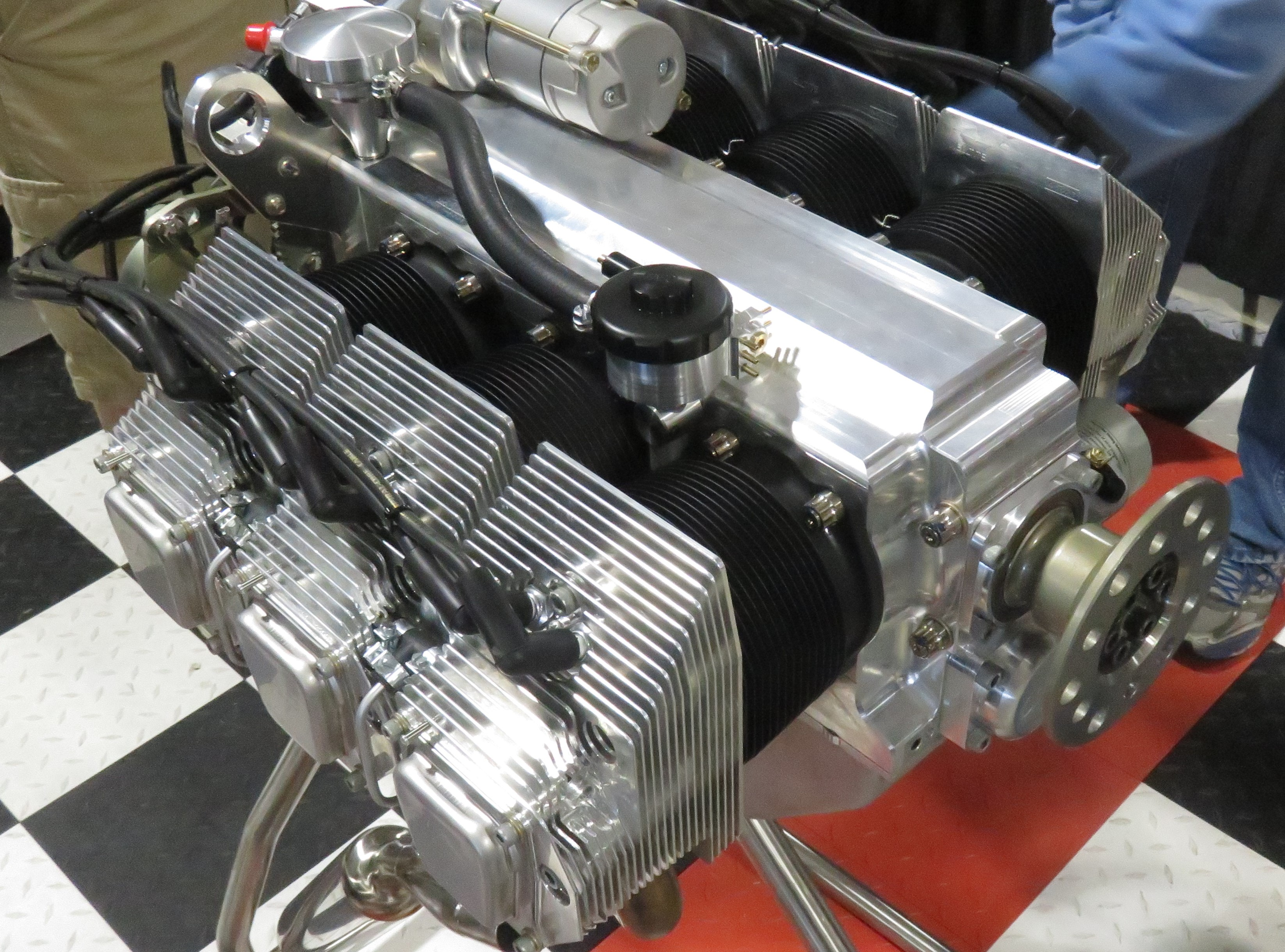
- CAMit 3300
- Type: Piston aircraft engine
- National origin: Australia
- Manufacturer: CAMit Pty Ltd
- Major applications: Light sport aircraft; Ultralight aircraft

The CAMit 3300 is an Australian lightweight four-stroke, 6-cylinder, horizontally opposed air-cooled aircraft engine. Direct drive and using a solid-lifter valvetrain, the 3300 develops 127 hp (95 kW) at 3300rpm.

The engine was manufactured by CAMit Pty Ltd, of Bundaberg, Queensland, Australia. CAMit has manufactured engines for Jabiru since the Italian-sourced engines used by Jabiru became unavailable in 1991. After receiving requests for and producing aftermarket Jabiru engine parts, CAMit went on to produce whole engines incorporating these modifications in late 2013.

Many parts are interchangeable with the original components from Jabiru 3300 engine. However, in terms of component design, lubrication, valve train operation and metallurgy, the CAE engine is a completely different motor to the Jabiru design.

The CAMit series of engines are classed as Experimental. Each serial number includes 'SLRE', designating 'Solid-Lifter Revised Experimental'.

CAMit Pty Ltd ceased operations and was placed in receivership in October 2016.

== Results of R&D program ==
- Improved crankcase sealing, and the addition of piston cooling jets
- The use of CAE-design 7/16" thru bolts
- 25+ modifications to the heads, including use of an improved alloy
- Modified barrels: 10+ modifications, including thicker base flanges, improved honing process, and the reversal of piston orientation
- Improved flywheel coupling - lessens the chance of failure through various modifications
- Belt-driven 40A and 15A alternators to help damp the flywheel and provide charging at idle
- Redesigned rocker arms
- Modified oil cooler adaptor (TOCA also available)
- Breather/oil separator (see photo; device connected to rear end of black hose)
- Redesigned, easy to read oil dipstick
- Honda ignition coils, lifters, and starter clutches are used
- Ignition lead sets are assembled in-house
- CAE-design collectors and twin-exhaust system

A number of accessories were sold to complement both CAE and Jabiru engines.

- CHT Sensors
- TOCA (Thermostatic Oil Cooler Adaptor) - blocks off oil passage to cooler until engine is at temperature
- Digital tachometer sensor
- Engine inhibitor system - allows longer storage while preventing bore rust from occurring. Can be applied from the pilot's seat, just on shutdown.

== CAE not subject to CASA restrictions ==
In December 2014, the Australian Civil Aviation Safety Authority (CASA) imposed restrictions on all aircraft powered by Jabiru engines "in response to power-related problems involving engines manufactured by Jabiru Aircraft Pty Ltd (Jabiru)". It was stated in Sport Pilot magazine shortly after this that "the CAMIT [sic] engine is not subject to the Jabiru operational limitations described in 292/14, because the engine is not manufactured by a person under licence from, or under a contract with, Jabiru."

As of July 1, 2016, these restrictions were lifted for "most Jabiru-powered aircraft in Australia. Stock Jabiru engines that are maintained in strict accordance with Jabiru service bulletins and maintenance instructions are no longer affected by the limitations, which were issued in late 2014."

== Specifications ==
Data from the manufacturer

	3300SLRE
Configuration	6-cylinder opposed
First run	October 2013
Displacement	3300cc (201cu. in)
Bore	97.5mm
Stroke	74mm
Compression Ratio	8.45:1
Dry Weight	82.4 kg (182 lbs)
Max. Power	127 hp/95 kW @3300rpm
Max. Torque	285N.m @2900rpm
Power to Weight	1.15 kW/kg
Firing Order	1-4-5-2-3-6

== See also ==
- CAMit 2200
- ULPower UL390i
- ULPower UL520i
