= Pegasus PAL 95 =

PAL 95
- Type: Two cylinder, four stroke aircraft engine
- National origin: New Zealand
- Manufacturer: Pegasus Aviation (NZ) Ltd
- First run: c. 1999
- Major applications: American Sportscopter Ultrasport 254

The Pegasus PAL 95 is a twin cylinder, horizontally opposed aircraft engine that was developed by Pegasus Aviation (NZ) Ltd of New Zealand for use in ultralight aircraft. The engine is no longer available.

== Development ==
Designed to fill a similar market segment as the similar configuration and output HKS 700E, the PAL 95 produces 65 hp (48 kW) at 5200 rpm.

The PAL 95 has a computer-controlled engine management system that controls both the fuel injection system and the ignition timing, giving automatic altitude-compensated mixture control. The pistons are forged and ceramic coated. The intake valves are made from nickel-steel and the exhaust valves from stainless steel. The engine was supplied with an electric starter and an exhaust system by the factory as standard equipment.

Speed reduction is via a standard twin cog-belt system, with harmonic dampening on the crankshaft pulley. The initial TBO was estimated by the manufacturer as 1500 hours.

== Specifications (PAL 95) ==
Data from Cliche

=== General characteristics ===
- Type: Twin-cylinder, four stroke aircraft engine
- Displacement: 924 cc (56.4 cu in)
- Dry weight: 137 lb (62 kg)

=== Components ===
- Fuel system: fuel injection
- Reduction gear: dual parallel cog belts with harmonic dampening

=== Performance ===
- Power output: 65 hp (48 kW) at 5200 rpm
- Fuel consumption: 3.12 US gallons per hr (11.8 L/hr)

== See also ==
- List of aircraft engines
- HKS 700E
- Jabiru 2200
- KFM 112M
- Rotax 912
- ULPower UL260i
