= TsAGI A-4 =

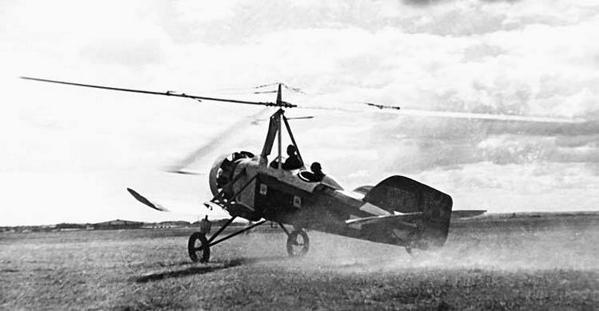

General information
- Type: Two seat autogyro
- National origin: Soviet Union
- Manufacturer: Central Aerohydrodynamic Institute (TsAGI)
- Designer: Nikolai Skrzhinskiy
- Number built: 10+

History
- First flight: 6 November 1932
- Developed from: TsAGI 2-EA

The TsAGI A-4, sometimes anglicised as CAHI A-4 or ZAGI A-4, (Russian: ЦАГИ А-4) was an early Russian autogyro, influenced by Cierva designs and delivered in small numbers to the Soviet Air Force in 1934.

== Design and development ==
The early Russian TsAGI autogyros were strongly influenced by the work of Juan de la Cierva and their 1931 designed A-4 was broadly similar to the Avro-built 1929 Cierva C.19, with a pylon mounted rotor, forward tractor configuration engine, small wings with ailerons and a conventional tail. It first flew on 6 November 1932 but it took about a year before rotor vibrational problems were solved and successful tests completed.

The flat sided fuselage of the A-4 was built around four tube steel longerons with internal tube bracing and covered with a mixture of fabric and plywood. A 220 kW (300 hp) M-26 (KIM) 7-cylinder radial engine was mounted in the nose, cowled in a Townend ring and with its output shaft pointing downwards at an angle of 4.5°. Its small, low wings were rectangular plan, wooden structures, each built around a pair of spars and braced from above by a pair of parallel struts, one from each spar to the upper fuselage longeron. They had 5° of dihedral but their semicircular tips were inclined upwards by a further 35°. Conventional ailerons occupying almost 30% of the overall wing area provided roll control. There were two open cockpits in tandem, the forward, passenger seat ahead of the wing trailing edge and close to the rotor axis. Dual control was fitted. At the rear the fin was long, rounded at the front but with a flat top. It mounted an unbalanced rudder, roughly rectangular though rounded at the rear corners, which extended to the keel. Small like the wing, the tailplane was braced from below and had swept leading edges; its elevators were more generous, with rounded tips and a large cut-out for rudder movement.

The A-4's four blade rotor was mounted at the top of a three legged pylon. The two rear legs were based on the upper fuselage longerons and the forward on the upper central fuselage. They positioned the rotor hub directly over the wing centre line and 96 mm (3.78 in) behind the centre of gravity. The 13 m (42 ft 8 in) rotor had blades with an aspect ratio of less than 14. They were of mixed construction, with steel main spars, two wooden subsidiary spars and covered in a mixture of ply and fabric. Their section was the airfoil used by the Cierva C.19. The blades were wire braced from above from an extension of the rotor axis, which leaned forwards with respect to the aircraft's axis by 2°. These wires were steel but contained rubber dampers. Hinges (double Cardan shafts) provided both upwards and in-plane movement, the latter damped by springs; normally such deflections were about ±7°.

Like a fixed wing aircraft, the A-4 was controlled with ailerons and elevators connected to a control column and the rudder to pedals. To the pilot's right there was a lever which enabled the rotor to be connected to the engine via reducing gears for jump starts and to ease heavy landings. The drive shaft followed the single forward rotor pylon strut, enclosed within a streamlined fairing. The A-4's fixed undercarriage had wheels on pairs of hinged V struts from the lower fuselage longerons with vertical legs, fitted with faired rubber shock absorbers, to the forward wing spar immediately below the wing strut. The tailskid also included a shock absorber.

== Operational history ==
At least ten A-4s were delivered for military training, liaison and reconnaissance duties during 1934.

== Specifications (1934 design) ==
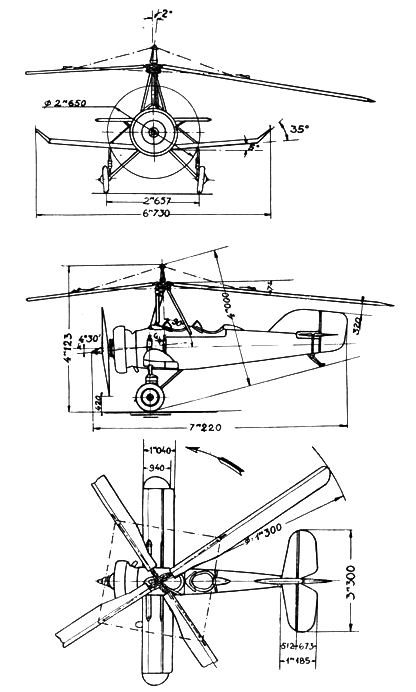
TsAGI A-4 3-view drawing from L'Aerophile April 1935

Data from L'Aérophile April 1935 pp.105-9

General characteristics

- Crew: Two
- Length: 7.22 m (23 ft 8 in) over fuselage
- Wingspan: 6.73 m (22 ft 1 in)
- Height: 4.123 m (13 ft 6 in) to tip of rotor pylon in flight attitude.
- Wing area: 7.97 m^{2} (85.8 sq ft) including ailerons
- Airfoil: TsAGI A
- Empty weight: 1,065 kg (2,348 lb)
- Gross weight: 1,365 kg (3,009 lb)
- Powerplant: 1 × M-26 (KIM) 7-cylinder radial engine, 220 kW (300 hp) at 1,800 rpm
- Main rotor diameter: 13.00 m (42 ft 8 in)
- Main rotor area: 132.7 m^{2} (1,428 sq ft) swept; 4 blades, each with area 3.0 m^{2} (32 sq ft). Aerofoil Göttingen 429.
- Propellers: 2-bladed Type A-7, 2.65 m (8 ft 8 in) diameter

Performance

- Maximum speed: 170 km/h (110 mph, 92 kn) at 100 m (328 ft)
- Cruise speed: 140 km/h (87 mph, 76 kn)
- Minimum control speed: 60–65 km/h (37–40 mph, 32–35 kn) to maintain level flight at 100 m (328 ft)
- Range: 460 km (290 mi, 250 nmi) twice radius of action
- Service ceiling: 4,100 m (13,500 ft) practical
- Time to altitude: 6 min to 1,000 m (3,281 ft); 43 min to 4,000 m (13,123 ft)
- Lift-to-drag: optimum 5.6
- Disk loading: 10.4 kg/m^{2} (2.1 lb/sq ft)
- Fuel consumption: 0.56 kg/km (2.0 lb/mi)
- Take-off distance: 30–40 m (98–131 ft) into 5 m/s (16 ft/s) wind.
- Landing distance: 3–10 m (10–33 ft)

== Bibliography ==
- Maslov, Mikhail (2015). Soviet Autogyros 1929–1942. Solihull, UK: Helion. ISBN 978-1-910294-65-9.
