= ULPower UL520i =

Belgian aircraft engine

UL520i
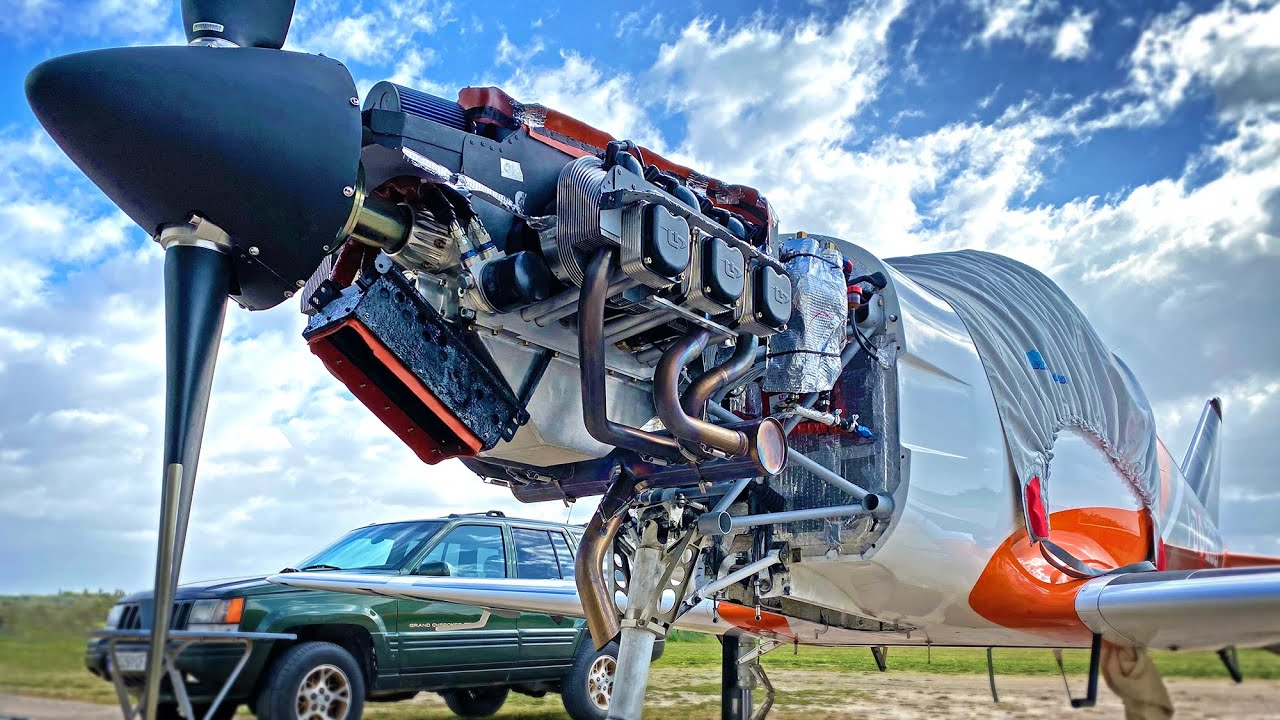
- Type: Aircraft engine
- National origin: Belgium
- Manufacturer: ULPower

The ULPower UL520i is a Belgian aircraft engine, designed and produced by ULPower Aero Engines of Geluveld for use in homebuilt aircraft.

== Design and development ==
The engine is a six-cylinder four-stroke, horizontally-opposed, 5,254 cc (320.6 cu in) displacement, air-cooled, direct-drive, gasoline engine design. It employs dual electronic ignition and produces 180 to 200 hp (134 to 149 kW) at 3300 rpm.

== Variants ==
UL520i
Base model with fuel injection and a compression ratio of 8:1, producing 180 hp (134 kW) at 3300 rpm
UL520iS
Model with 8.7:1 compression ratio, fuel injection, producing 200 hp (149 kW) at 3300 rpm
UL520iST
Model under development, fuel injection, turbo-normalizer, producing 220 hp (164 kW) at 2700 rpm sea level
UL520iSA
Inverted oil system version of the UL520iS, producing 200 hp (149 kW) at 3300 rpm
UL520iHPS
Model under development
UL520iSRR
Model with reversed rotation, 8.7:1 compression ratio, fuel injection, producing 200 hp (149 kW) at 3300 rpm

== Applications ==
- Whisper X350 Generation II
- DarkAero 1

== Specifications (UL520i) ==
Data from Tacke and manufacturer

=== General characteristics ===
- Type: Six-cylinder, four-stroke aircraft engine
- Bore: 105.6 mm (4.2 in)
- Stroke: 100 mm (3.9 in)
- Displacement: 5,254 cc (320.6 cu in)
- Length: 723 mm (28.5 in)
- Width: 736 mm (29.0 in)
- Height: 472 mm (18.6 in)
- Dry weight: 108 kg (238.1 lb), ready to fly

=== Components ===
- Fuel system: fuel injection
- Fuel type: gasoline
- Cooling system: air
- Reduction gear: none

=== Performance ===
- Power output: 180 hp (134 kW) at 3300
- Compression ratio: 8:1

== See also ==
Aircraft of comparable role, configuration, and era

- CAMit 3300
- Jabiru 5100

Related lists

- List of aircraft engines
