= ULPower Aero Engines =

Belgian aircraft engine manufacturer

- ULPower Company Logo
- Company type: NV
- Industry: Aircraft Engine Manufacturer
- Founded: 2006
- Headquarters: Ypres, Belgium
- Products: Aircraft Engines
- Website: http://www.ulpower.com

ULPower Aero Engines is a Belgian company which manufactures engines designed for use in light aircraft and rotorcraft.

== History ==
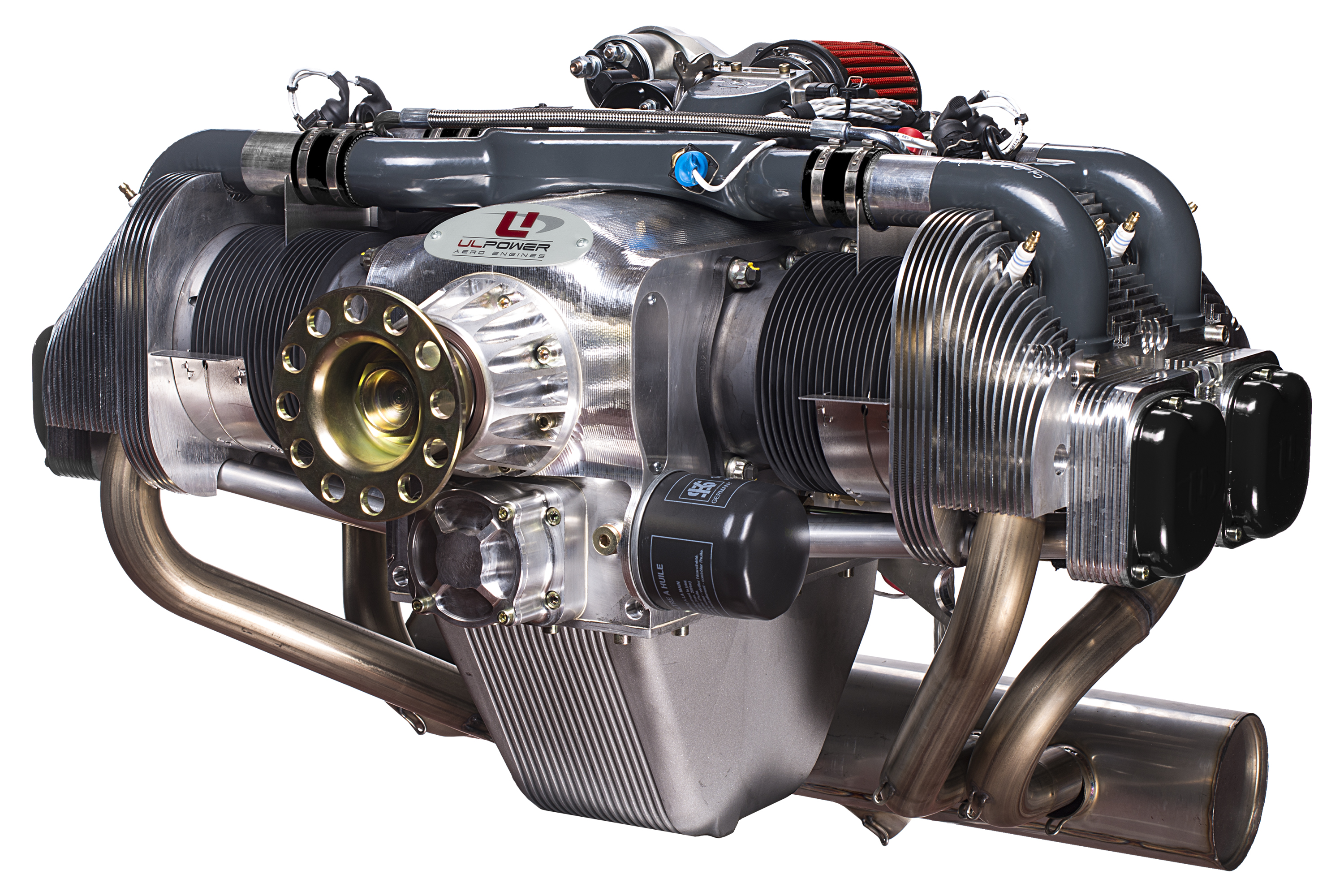
UL350iS

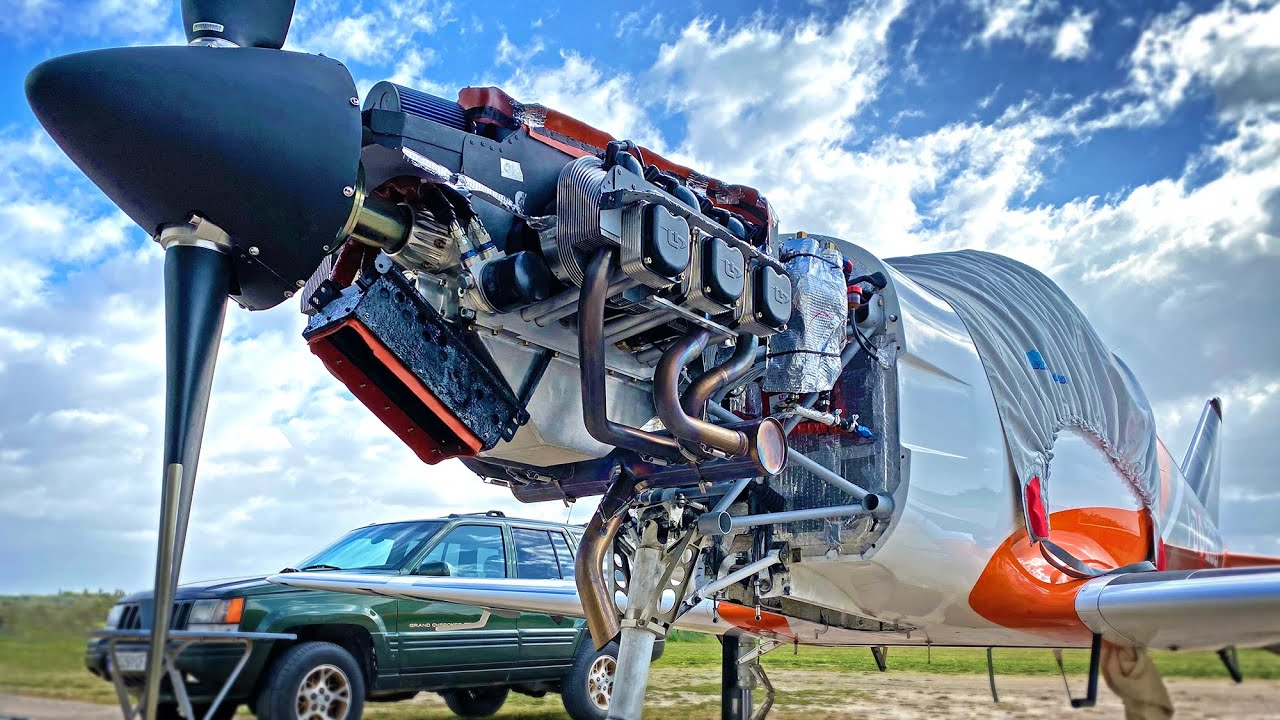
UL520iS installation

In 2001, the founding partners of ULPower were asked to fix an issue with a Jabiru engine fitted into a helicopter. By examining the setup they decided to build a new engine from scratch instead, because the particular Jabiru engine simply was too small for the application. The new engine should have the following aims and objectives: FADEC, simple, robust, easy to maintain, low parts count, high power to weight ratio and low cost of ownership. The founding partners had years of experience in the professional automotive rally industry. This included engine design, development and production for the Dakar Rally and a proprietary ECU Based on the years of engine experience from Rally, the prototype helicopter engine and the proprietary ECU, they decided to form a company producing aero engines. A couple of more objectives were added: The engine should be direct drive, air cooled and be able to run on both AVGAS and MOGAS with ethanol.

Three of the four founding partners are Nicolas Josson of ROPA.BE and Lionel and Pascal D’Hondt who owns DR Tuning in Belgium. ROPA.BE is a metal turning and milling company making engine parts, while DR Tuning works in the motor racing arena.

After a few years of development and testing of several prototypes the first UL260i 72 kW (97 hp) engine was installed in an aircraft (a Lambert Mission 106). First flight tests were performed in December 2005. After proving the engine reliability on the ground and in the air, the project was merged into an official company structure. ULPower Aero Engines was officially formed in March 2006 to concentrate on the further design and manufacture of engines where light weight, power and reliability are important to the client. Series production commenced by the end of that year.

Over the first years, the UL260i has equipped several popular light aircraft, e.g. Fly Synthesis Storch, Zenair Zodiac CH601, Just Escapade, Dyn'Aéro MCR01, Hannuman X-Air. In 2017 Sonex Aircraft introduced their "B" models with slightly larger fuselage giving room for more engine options. Along that introduction the 4 cylinder ULPower engines became a standard factory supported alternative.

In 2009, ULPower launched new engine types: the UL260iS 80 kW (107 hp) and the UL350i/iS 93 kW (125 hp) where the stroke was increased from 74 mm to 100 mm. About the same time the Twister Aerobatics Team, flying the Silence Twister, was looking for a more powerful engine that also could run inverted, as a replacement for the original 80 hp Jabiru 2200. They already knew about the UL260i/iS and in cooperation the UL260iSA was developed. It has 80 kW (107 hp) and a fully inverted oil system.

For the French market specifically, two adapted versions were available: the UL260iF 74 kW (100 hp) based on the UL260iS and the UL350iF 90 kW (120 hp) based on the UL350iS, specifically for gyrocopter application. The UL350iF is no longer available.

The product line was expanded again in 2013, with a line of 6-cylinder engines in both 3900 cc and 5200 cc variants, each with an option for higher or lower compression requiring different minimum fuel grades. The 6 cylinder engines can power larger experimental and kit-planes (non-certified planes) that are typically powered by Lycoming and Lycoming clones in the O320-O360 range.

The ULPower engines are modular. They all have the same bore of 105.6 mm. The stroke is either 74 or 100 mm, which makes the 260 and 350 series of engines. Adding one extra set of cylinders makes the 390/520 family.

== Engines ==
ULPower produces a range of direct drive air-cooled horizontally-opposed engines with multiport fuel-injection and FADEC. All engines can run on avgas (100LL or UL91). All engines can run on automotive gasoline with up to 15% ethanol and with octane ratings as specified.

4-cylinder engines
Model	Power	Displacement	Ready to fly weight	Minimum octane	Notes
UL260i	97 hp (72 kW)	2592 cc	72.9 kg (161 lb)	95RON 87MON (91AKI)	
UL260iS	107 hp (80 kW)	2592 cc	72.9 kg (161 lb)	98RON 90MON (94AKI)	
UL260iF	100 hp (75 kW)	2592 cc	72.9 kg (161 lb)	98RON 90MON (94AKI)	Built for French UL regulations
UL260iSA	107 hp (80 kW)	2592 cc	75.4 kg (166 lb)	98RON 90MON (94AKI)	Aerobatic
UL260iSK	107 hp (80 kW)	2592 cc	72.9 kg (161 lb)	98RON 90MON (94AKI)	Unknown at this time
UL350i	118 hp (88 kW)	3503 cc	78.4 kg (173 lb)	95RON 87MON (91AKI)	
UL350iS	130 hp (97 kW)	3503 cc	78.4 kg (173 lb)	98RON 90MON (94AKI)	
UL350iSA	130 hp (97 kW)	3503 cc	78.9 kg (174 lb)	98RON 90MON (94AKI)	Aerobatic
UL350iHPS	150 hp (112 kW)	3503 cc	82.4 kg (182 lb)	98RON 90MON (94AKI)	Helicopter

6-cylinder engines
Model	Power	Displacement	Ready to fly weight	Minimum octane	Notes
UL390i	140 hp (104 kW)	3888 cc	100 kg (220 lb)	95RON 87MON (91AKI)	
UL390iS	160 hp (119 kW)	3888 cc	100 kg (220 lb)	98RON 90MON (94AKI)	
UL390iSA	160 hp (119 kW)	3888 cc	103.8 kg (229 lb)	98RON 90MON (94AKI)	Aerobatic
UL520i	180 hp (134 kW)	5254 cc	108 kg (238 lb)	95RON 87MON (91AKI)	
UL520iS	200 hp (149 kW)	5254 cc	108 kg (238 lb)	98RON 90MON (94AKI)	
UL520T	220 hp (164 kW)	5254 cc	122 kg (269 lb)	98RON 90MON (94AKI)	Turbocharged
UL520iSRR	200 hp (149 kW)	5254 cc	108 kg (238 lb)	98RON 90MON (94AKI)	Reverse Rotation
UL520iSA	200 hp (149 kW)	5254 cc	108 kg (238 lb)	98RON 90MON (94AKI)	Aerobatic
