= Kamov A-7 =

Soviet two-seat wing-type autogyro with a three-blade rotor

Kamov
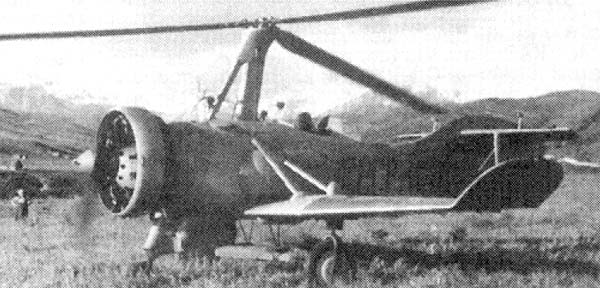

General information
- Type: Two seat autogyro
- National origin: Soviet Union
- Manufacturer: TsAGI (Центра́льный аэрогидродинами́ческий институ́т, (ЦАГИ), "Tsentralniy Aerogidrodinamicheskiy Institut" - Central Aero-hydrodynamic Institute)
- Designer: Nikolai Kamov (engineer)
- Primary user: Soviet Air Forces
- Number built: 7 (1 A-7, 1 A-7bis, 5 A-7-3A)

History
- Introduction date: 1938
- First flight: September 20, 1934

The Kamov A-7 is a Soviet two-seat wing-type autogyro with a three-blade rotor, developed by Nikolai Kamov and built by the Central Aerohydronamic Institute (TsAGI). It was the world's first combat autogyro and the first mass-produced rotary-wing aircraft in the USSR. Two experimental machines were built, the A-7 and A-7bis, and five production aircraft (A-7-3A) were completed.

== History and development ==
Development of the A-7 began in 1931 at TsAGI, which had previously manufactured the TsAGI A-4 autogyro. It was intended to be used for communications, reconnaissance, and artillery spotting, with possible use on naval vessels. The A-7 was completed in 1934. The A-7bis featured better aerodynamics and test flights for it began in 1937. The prototype of the lightened production aircraft, the A-7-3A, was completed in 1940.

The autogyros were propelled by a 353 kW M-22 air-cooled engine with a maximum speed of 221 km/h. The tricycle landing gear featured hydraulic dampeners and it, along with the rotor mounts and wheels were covered in fairings for better aerodynamics. The wing could be folded up in the center and slotted ailerons were installed in the tail.

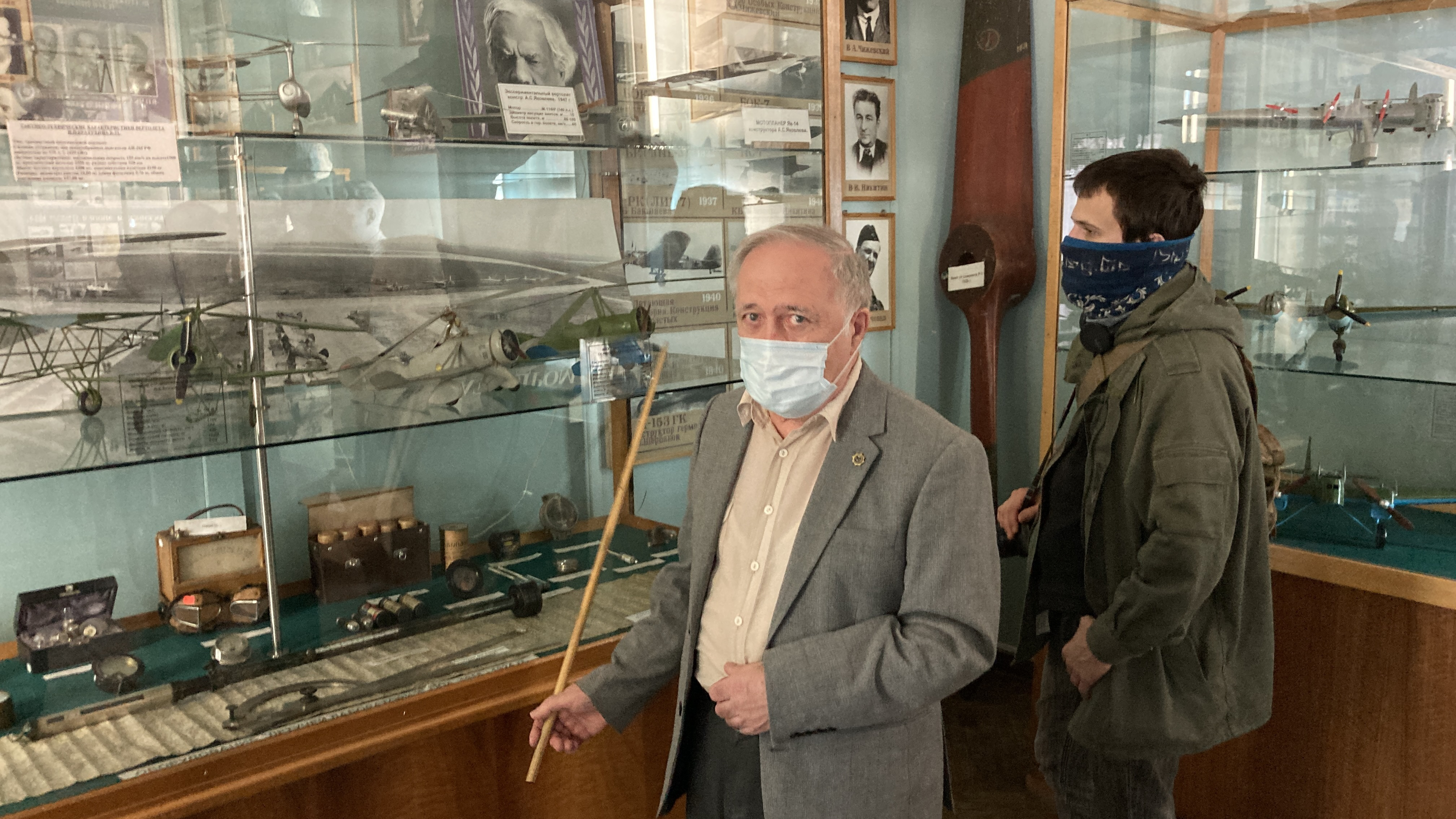
Model A-7 (center right), S V Semenychev, Central House of Aviation and Cosmonautics

Armament consisted of three machine guns. The front armament consisted of a single, belt-fed, PV-1 machine gun fired through the propeller. Rear armament consisted of the twin mount DA-2 variant of the Degtyaryov machine gun on an annular turret. Later modifications added the capability of carrying four FAB-100 bombs and six RS-82 unguided rockets. A 13-SK3 radio, superseded by the RSI-3 radio, was installed for communications and a PO1TE 1B camera was used for aerial photography.

== Operational history ==
During the Winter War, the A-7 and A-7bis were used as artillery spotters, piloted by Colonel A. Ivanovsky and Colonel D. Kosits. They were also used for several reconnaissance sorties. In the spring of 1941 the A-7 was used to pollinate fruit trees in an expedition to the foothills of the Tien Shan. During World War II the A-7-3A aircraft were used on the Western Front near Smolensk to assist with adjusting artillery fire. The aircraft were also used during night flights to drop leaflets on enemy positions. One of the A-7-3A models has its fuselage, wings, and blades pierced by heavy machine gun fire. The observer's legs were wounded as was the pilot's arm, but they were able to fly the damaged autogyro back to their own lines. It was repaired at the village of Bilimbai (Sverdlovsk Oblast), where the design bureau had been relocated due to advancing German forces.

== Bibliography ==
- Maslov, Mikhail (2015). Soviet Autogyros 1929–1942. Solihull, UK: Helion. ISBN 978-1-910294-65-9.
