= Jabiru (disambiguation) =

Jabiru is a species of stork, Jabiru mycteria, found in the Americas. The term may also refer to:

== Other birds ==
- Black-necked stork (Ephippiorhynchus asiaticus) of Asia and Australia, often called jabiru in Australia
- Saddle-billed stork (Ephippiorhynchus senegalensis) of sub-Saharan Africa, sometimes called jabiru

== Aircraft and aerospace ==
- Farman F.120, a family of multi-engined airliners built by Farman Aviation in France in the 1920s suffixed "Jabiru"
- Farman F.170 Jabiru, a single-engined airliner built by Farman Aviation in France in the 1920s
- Jabiru, also called Jaguar, a British sounding rocket used for research from 1960 to 1964
- Jabiru Aircraft, a light aircraft manufacturer in Australia, maker of the following models:
  - Jabiru 1600 engine
  - Jabiru 2200 engine
  - Jabiru 3300 engine
  - Jabiru J160 aircraft
  - Jabiru J170 aircraft
  - Jabiru J230 aircraft
  - Jabiru J430 aircraft
- Jabiru Fleet, former models of Australian satellite made by NewSat

== Other uses ==
- Jabiru, Northern Territory, a town in Australia
  - Jabiru Airport
  - Town of Jabiru, a former local government area in Northern Territory of Australia
- Jabiru's Palace, the official residence of the Vice President of Brazil

== See also ==
- Emu and the Jabiru, an Aboriginal Australian myth
- Jabiru toadlet, a species of Australian toad
- Jabru, an Elamite god of the underworld
- Jaburu, an alternative spelling for the stork, used as a tribe name in Survivor: The Amazon
