= Jabiru J250 =

Type of aircraft

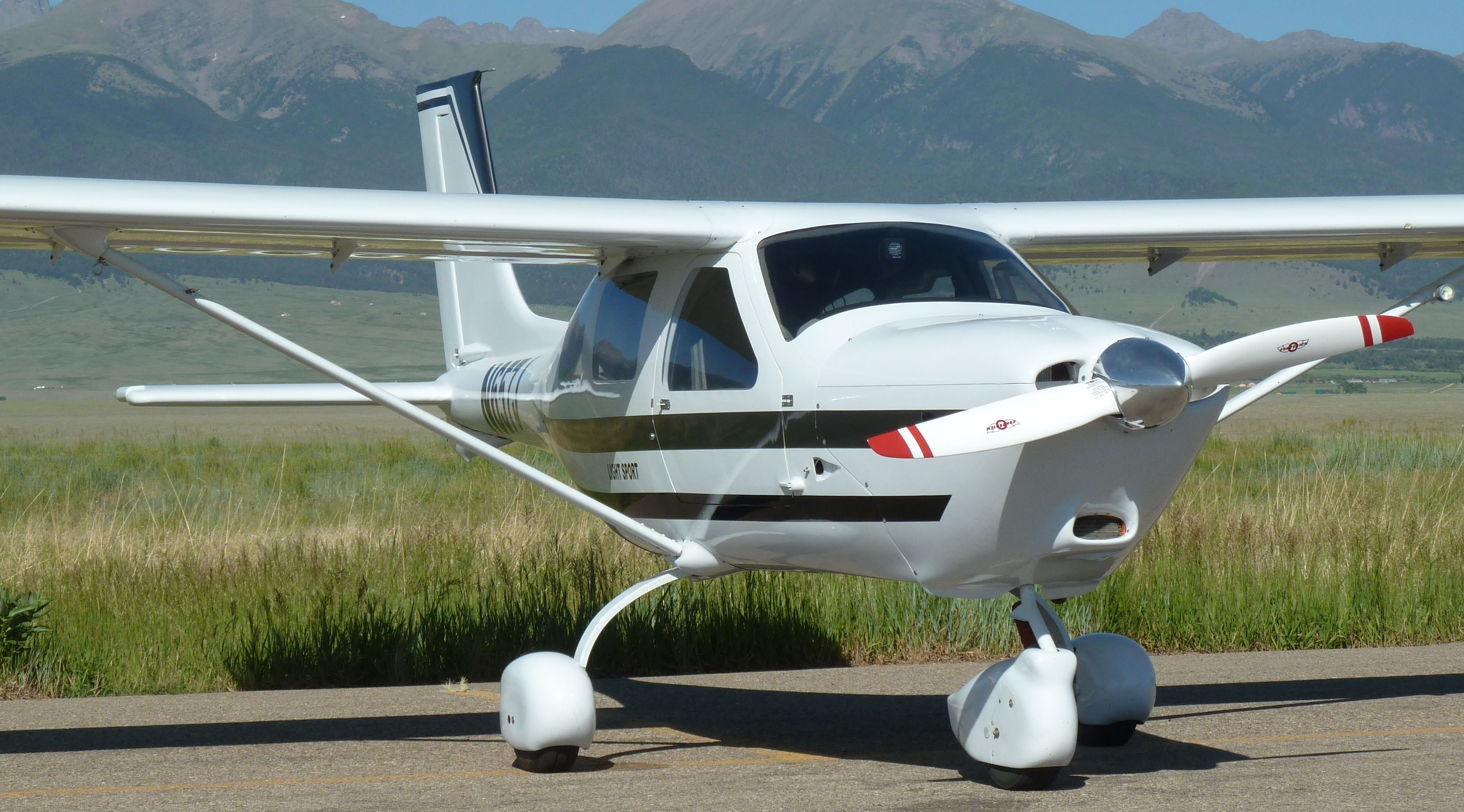

General information
- Type: Light Sport Aircraft Homebuilt
- National origin: Australia
- Manufacturer: Jabiru Aircraft

History
- Developed from: Jabiru J230

The Jabiru J250 is one model in a large family of two and four seat Australian light aircraft developed as touring aircraft and provided in kit form by Jabiru Aircraft. The aircraft was also assembled and sold in the US by Jabiru USA as a Light Sport Aircraft (LSA).

== Design and development ==
The J250 is constructed from composite materials. The 30 ft (9.1 m) span high wing is strut-braced. The standard engine is the 120 hp (89 kW) Jabiru 3300 six cylinder, horizontally opposed, four stroke aircraft engine. The tricycle landing gear has optional wheel pants. The two-seat cabin features a width of 44 in (112 cm). The J250 shares the same fuselage as the four-seat J450 model, the difference being that the rear seats are not installed on the J250. As a result, the baggage area in the J250 is among the largest in its class.

== Variants ==
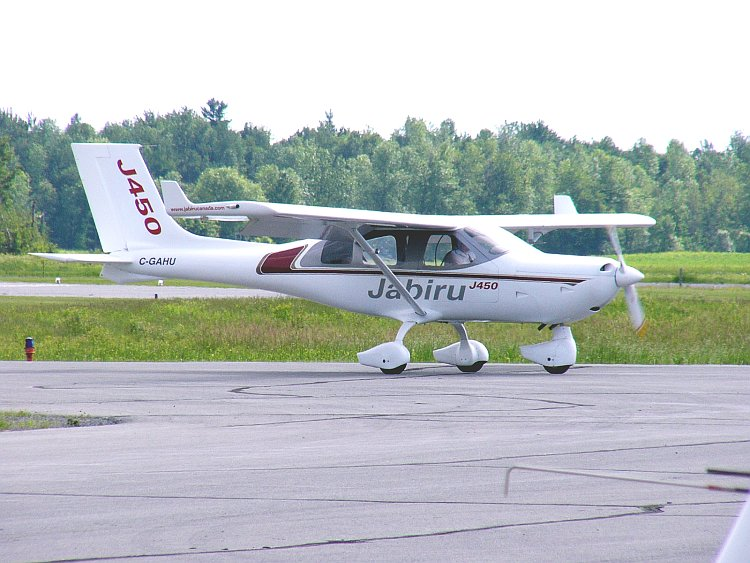
J450

data from Jabiru

Jabiru J160
Jabiru J170
US light-sport aircraft two-seat model derived from the J160.
Jabiru J200
Jabiru J230
A two-seater, designed as a US light-sport aircraft, with a large baggage compartment behind the seats.
Jabiru J250
Jabiru J400
Four seat version powered by a 120 hp (89 kW) Jabiru 3300 engine and marketed circa 2004.
Jabiru J430
A four seater version of the J230 with two seats in the former baggage compartment.

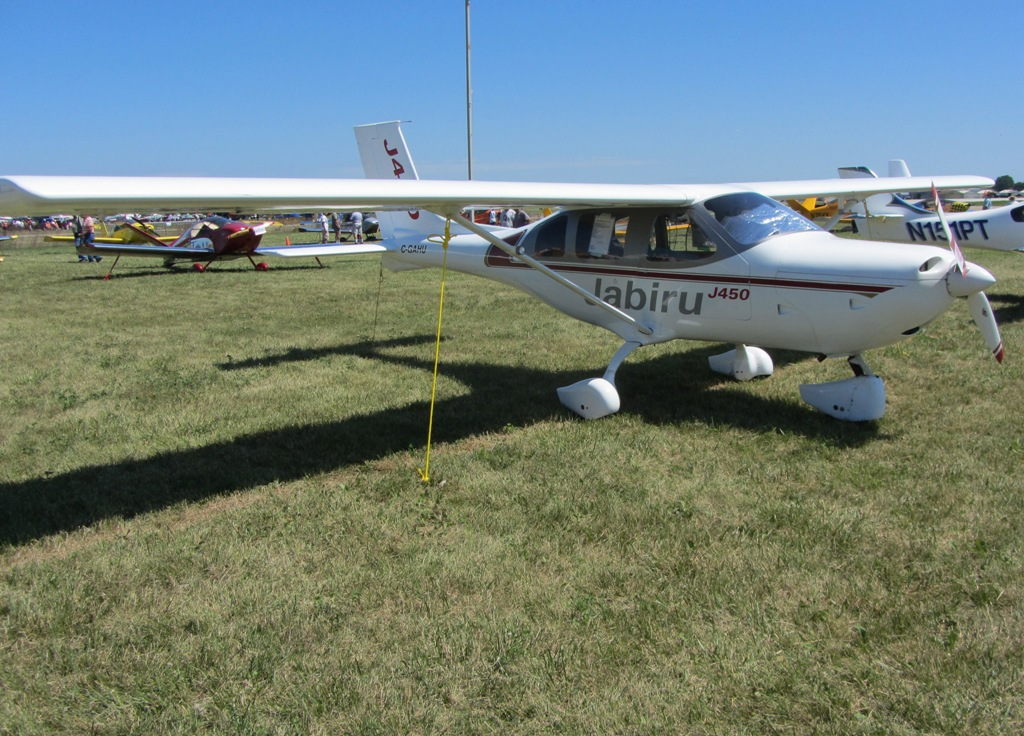
Jabiru J450

Jabiru J450
Jabiru SP
Two seat version for the US light-sport aircraft market, powered by a 120 hp (89 kW) Jabiru 3300 engine and marketed circa 2004. The SP has a cruise speed of 213 km/h (132 mph)
Jabiru UL
Two seat version for the European microlight category powered by an 80 hp (60 kW) Jabiru 2200 engine and marketed circa 2004. The SP has a cruise speed of 185 km/h (115 mph)

== Specifications (J250) ==
Data from Jabiru Pacific

General characteristics

- Crew: 2
- Capacity: 480 lb (220 kg) useful load
- Length: 21 ft 5 in (6.53 m)
- Wingspan: 30 ft (9.1 m)
- Height: 7 ft 10 in (2.39 m)
- Wing area: 120 sq ft (11 m^{2})
- Empty weight: 840 lb (381 kg)
- Max takeoff weight: 1,320 lb (599 kg)
- Powerplant: 1 × Jabiru 3300 6 cylinder, 4 stroke piston engine, 120 hp (89 kW)
- Propellers: 2-bladed Wooden/Composite
- Propellers: 5 ft (1.5 m) diameter

Performance

- Maximum speed: 138 kn (159 mph, 256 km/h)
- Cruise speed: 120 kn (140 mph, 220 km/h)
- Stall speed: 45 kn (52 mph, 83 km/h)
- Never exceed speed: 138 kn (159 mph, 256 km/h)
- Range: 800 nmi (920 mi, 1,480 km)
- Service ceiling: 15,000 ft (4,600 m)
- Rate of climb: 1,000 ft/min (5.1 m/s)
- Wing loading: 11.0 lb/sq ft (54 kg/m^{2})
- Power/mass: 4.3 kg/kW
- Flight Load Factor + 4.0g - 2.0g
