= List of RA-Aus certified aircraft types =

This page is a list of commercially available aircraft which may be registered under Recreational Aviation Australia rules.

== Recreational aircraft ==
Manufacturer	Model	Kit/Factory	Wing	U/C	Seats	Cruise (knots)	Notes
Aeroprakt	A-22 "Foxbat"	Factory	High Wing	Tricycle	2	85-90	Flapperons
Allegro	Allegro 2000 and Allegro 2007	Approved Kit and Factory Built	High Wing	Tricycle	2	95	Metal wing and tail, composite fuselage. Was manufactured in the Czech Republic until the start of 2009 where production was moved to the USA to try and stabilise the selling price in their largest market. (The Euro to US dollar conversion rates fluctuated extensively causing the price to go up and down) The aircraft is now manufactured by Fantasy Air USA in Oregon and is fully LSA compliant.
Evektor	SportStar	Factory	Low	Tricycle	2	105	All-metal, bubble canopy
Jabiru	J120	Factory	High	Tricycle	2	100	
Jabiru	J160	Both	High	Tricycle	2	100	
Jabiru	J170	Both	High	Tricycle	2	100	
Jabiru	J230	Both	High	Tricycle	2	120	
Jabiru	J250	Kit	High	Tricycle	2		
Jabiru	UL-D	Kit	High	Tricycle	2		
Pipistrel	Sinus	Factory & Kit Built Approved	High Wing	Tricycle or Taildragger	2	115	All-Carbon Fiber, winner NASA CAFE Challenge 2007, winner NASA GAT Challenge 2008, First solo around the world flight for an Ultralight Aircraft 2005, Winner FAI World Air Games 2001-2002. NASA have recently (June 2009) purchased this airframe for electric engine testing as a joint venture with Stanford University (USA) deeming the Sinus to be the most efficient light aircraft design in the world.
Pipistrel	Virus - Virus SW (Short Wing)	Factory & Kit Built Approved	High Wing	Tricycle or Taildragger	2	125 Standard, 148 SW model	All-Carbon Fiber, winner NASA CAFE Challenge 2007, winner NASA GAT Challenge 2008, First solo around the world flight for an Ultralight Aircraft 2005. Fastest factory-built, mass-produced Ultralight aircraft available in the world (June 2009) with 148-knot cruise @ 75% burning 18 lph.
Savage Classic, Savage Cruiser, Savage Cub	Cub	Factory & Kit Built Approved	High Wing	Taildragger	2	85	Fabric-covered updated copy of the original Piper Cub, available in three separate models, Classic, Cruiser, Cub. Built for airport operations and bush flying, Alaskan wheel options, snow skis etc.
TL 2000 Sting Carbon	Sting	Approved Factory Built	Low Wing	Tricycle	2	135	Carbon fibre construction, fast and economical, retractable version, constant-speed propeller, Rotax 80, 100 or 115 HP engines
Raj Hamsa Ultralights	X-Air Hanuman	Approved Kit or LSA	High Wing	Tricycle	2	80-85	Affordable rag-and-tube construction, Rotax 582, 912 or Jabiru Engine, simple construction of around 100 hours
X-Air Standard	X-Air Standard	Approved Kit	High Wing	Tricycle	2	55-60	Affordable rag-and-tube construction, more than 170 in Australia / New Zealand, Simple construction of around 40 hours for the standard model usually powered by the Rotax 582 engine

== Microlights ==
Manufacturer	Model	Kit/Factory	Wing	U/C	Seats	Cruise	Notes
Pipistrel	Spider	Kit and Factory Built	Tube-and-fabric, made by Hazard in Italy	Tricycle (Composite)	2	45-50 Knots	Rotax 503, 582 or 912 engines
