= Jabiru 5100 =

Australian 8-cylinder aircraft engine

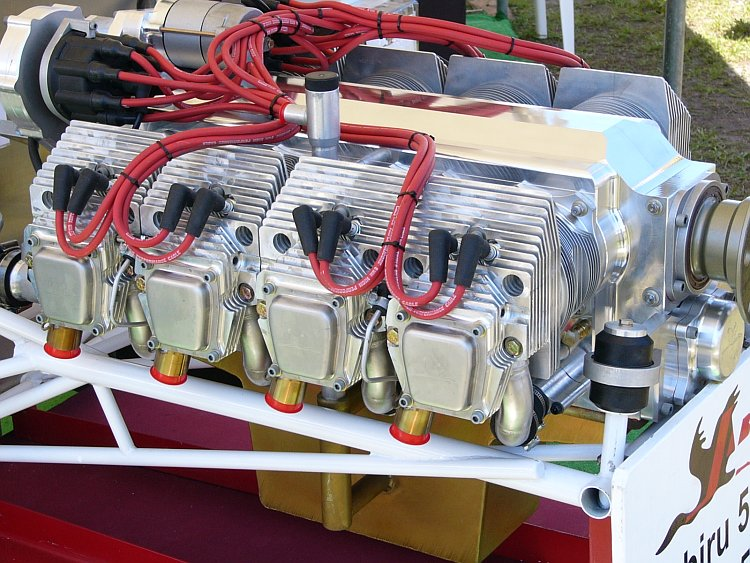
- Type: Piston aero-engine
- National origin: Australia
- Manufacturer: Jabiru Aircraft

The Jabiru 5100 is a lightweight four-stroke horizontally opposed flat-eight air-cooled aircraft engine, manufactured by Jabiru Aircraft.

== Design and development ==
The engine is direct-drive and is fitted with alternators, silencers, vacuum pump drives and dual-ignition systems as standard equipment.

It was developed from the Jabiru 2200 and 3300 aeroengines, but whilst these earlier modular-design engines share the same bore and stroke (97.5mm x 74 mm), the 5100 flat-eight shares only the 97.5mm bore, and the stroke is increased from 74mm to 85mm.

In November 2014 the Australian Civil Aviation Safety Authority proposed restricting all Jabiru-powered aircraft to day-visual flight rules only, without passengers or solo students and within gliding distance of a safe place to land due to the engine line's safety record. Both the manufacturer and Recreational Aviation Australia opposed the restrictions as unnecessary and unwarranted. The final rule adopted somewhat softened the restrictions, allowing the carriage of passengers and students, but requiring them to sign an acknowledgement of risk before flying and restricting equipped aircraft to day VFR flight and within gliding distance of a safe place to land.

As of December 2023 the Jabiru 5100 is not listed on the Jabiru web site. The maintenance manual for the 5100 engine on the Jabiru web site states that the engine is no longer in production and only 50 units were ever produced.

== Applications ==
- Ibis GS-750 Grand Magic
- Quikkit Glass Goose

== Specifications ==
=== General characteristics ===
- Type: Flat-8
- Bore: 97.5 mm (3.84 in)
- Stroke: 85.0 mm (3.346 in)
- Displacement: 5,077 cm³ (310 in³)
- Length: 960 mm (37.79 in)
- Width: 638 mm (25.12 in)
- Height: 445 mm (17.54 in)
- Dry weight: 117 kg (257 lbs) with exhaust, carburetors, starter motor, alternator & ignition system

=== Components ===
- Fuel system: Mechanical fuel pump
- Fuel type: AVGAS 100/130
- Oil system: Wet sump
- Cooling system: Air-cooled

=== Performance ===
- Power output: 126.8 kW (170 hp) at 2,700 RPM (continuous); 134.2 kW (180 hp) at 3,000 RPM (intermittent)
- Compression ratio: 8:1
- Power-to-weight ratio: 1.10 kW/kg

== See also ==
- ULPower UL520i
