= BRM Costruções Aeronáuticas =

Portuguese aircraft manufacturer

- Company type: Privately held company
- Industry: Aerospace
- Headquarters: Pero Pinheiro, Portugal
- Products: Kit aircraft
- Website: www.landafrica.com

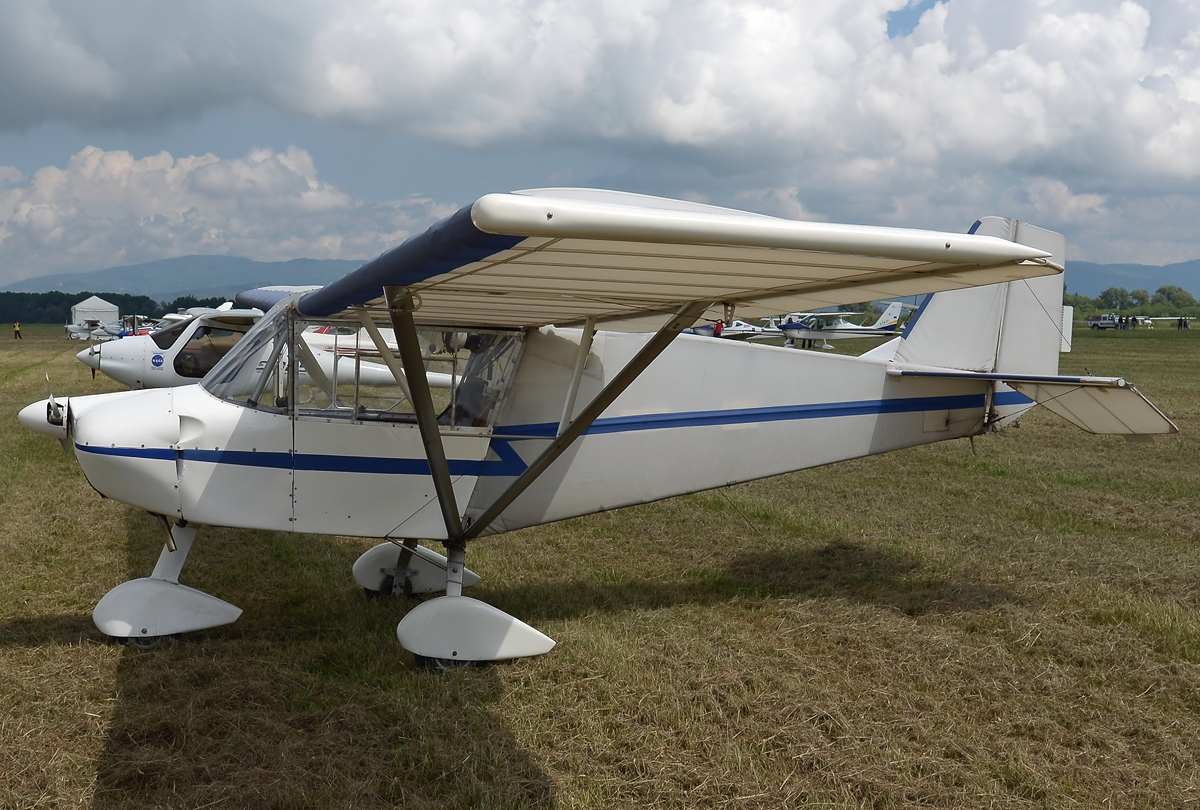
BRM Okavango

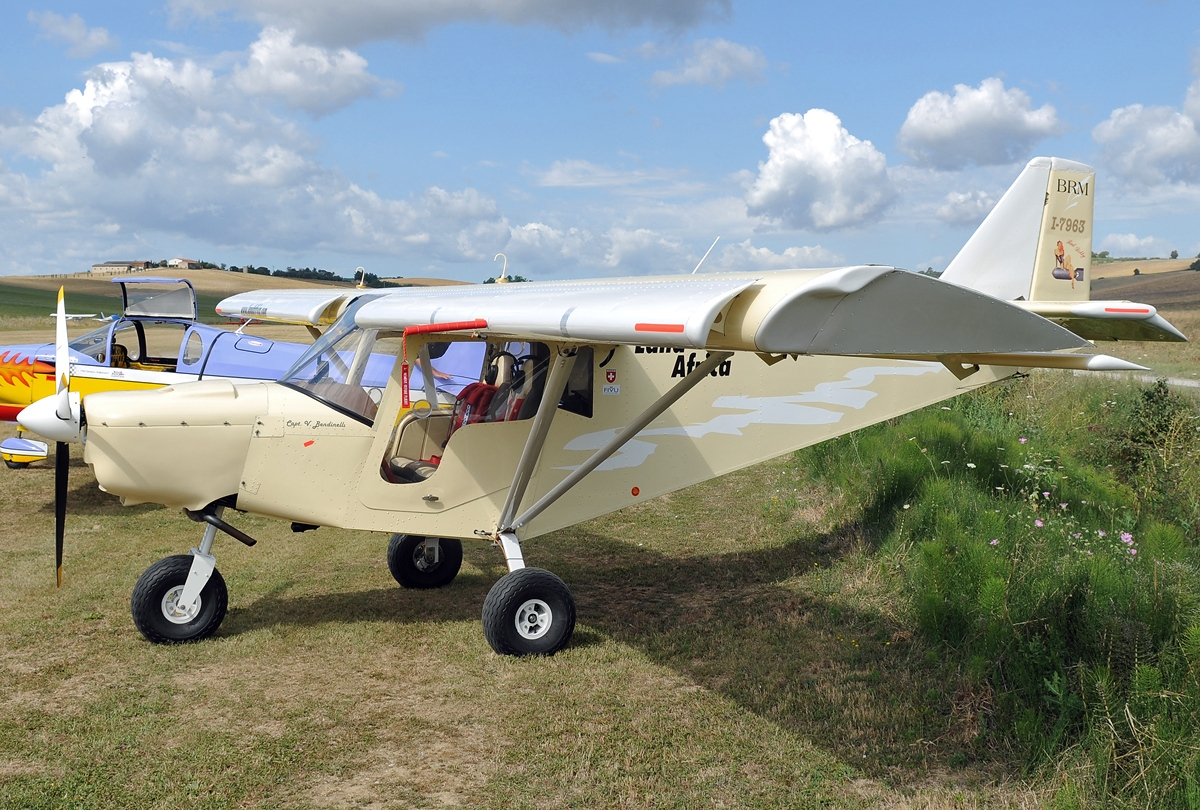
BRM Land Africa

BRM Costruções Aeronáuticas (English: BRM Aircraft Manufacturing) is a Portuguese aircraft manufacturer based in Pêro Pinheiro, Sintra. The company specializes in the design and manufacture of ultralight aircraft in the form kits for amateur construction and ready-to-fly aircraft for the European Fédération Aéronautique Internationale microlight category.

The company is noted as one of very few light aircraft manufacturers located in Portugal, a country not known for aircraft production.

BRM's aircraft are built with aluminium sheet "all-metal" construction. The company's first light two-seat STOL design was the BRM Okavango, which was superseded by the BRM Land Africa. The BRM Citius is an improved model, with a higher cruise speed. The company also produces a low-wing design, the two-seat BRM Argos.

The Citius is based on the MXP 740 and has some solutions also found on the MXP 1000, both designs from Colombian Engineer Max Tedesco.

== Aircraft ==
Summary of aircraft built by BRM Costruções Aeronáuticas
Model name	First flight	Number built	Type
BRM Okavango			Two-seat, high-wing STOL microlight aircraft, no longer in production
BRM Argos			Two-seat, low-wing microlight aircraft
BRM Land Africa			Two-seat, high-wing STOL microlight aircraft
BRM Citius			Two-seat, high-wing STOL microlight aircraft
