= BRM Argos =

Portuguese ultralight aircraft

Argos

General information
- Type: Ultralight aircraft
- National origin: Portugal
- Manufacturer: BRM Costruções Aeronáuticas
- Status: In production (2015)

The BRM Argos is a Portuguese ultralight aircraft, designed and produced by BRM Costruções Aeronáuticas. The aircraft is supplied as a kit for amateur construction.

== Design and development ==
The Argos was designed to comply with the Fédération Aéronautique Internationale microlight rules. It features a cantilever low-wing, a two-seats-in-side-by-side configuration enclosed cockpit, fixed tricycle landing gear and a single engine in tractor configuration.

The aircraft is made from 6061-T6 aluminum sheet, with its cockpit strengthened with steel roll-over protection. Its 8.4 m (27.6 ft) span wing has an area of 11.6 m^{2} (125 sq ft) and electrically actuated flaps. Standard engines available are the 100 hp (75 kW) Rotax 912ULS, 85 hp (63 kW) Jabiru 2200 and the 120 hp (89 kW) Jabiru 3300 four-stroke powerplants. Cockpit access is by two gull-winged doors

== Specifications (Argos) ==
Data from Bayerl and BRM Costruções Aeronáuticas,

General characteristics

- Crew: one
- Capacity: one passenger
- Length: 6.59 m (21 ft 7 in)
- Wingspan: 8.4 m (27 ft 7 in)
- Height: 2.4 m (7 ft 10 in)
- Wing area: 11.6 m^{2} (125 sq ft)
- Gross weight: 450 kg (992 lb)
- Fuel capacity: 70 litres (15 imp gal; 18 US gal)
- Powerplant: 1 × Rotax 912ULS four cylinder, liquid and air-cooled, four stroke aircraft engine, 75 kW (101 hp)

Performance

- Maximum speed: 220 km/h (140 mph, 120 kn)
- Cruise speed: 190 km/h (120 mph, 100 kn)
- Stall speed: 60 km/h (37 mph, 32 kn)
- Service ceiling: 4,200 m (13,800 ft)
- g limits: +4/-2
