= MySky MS One =

American light-sport aircraft

MS One
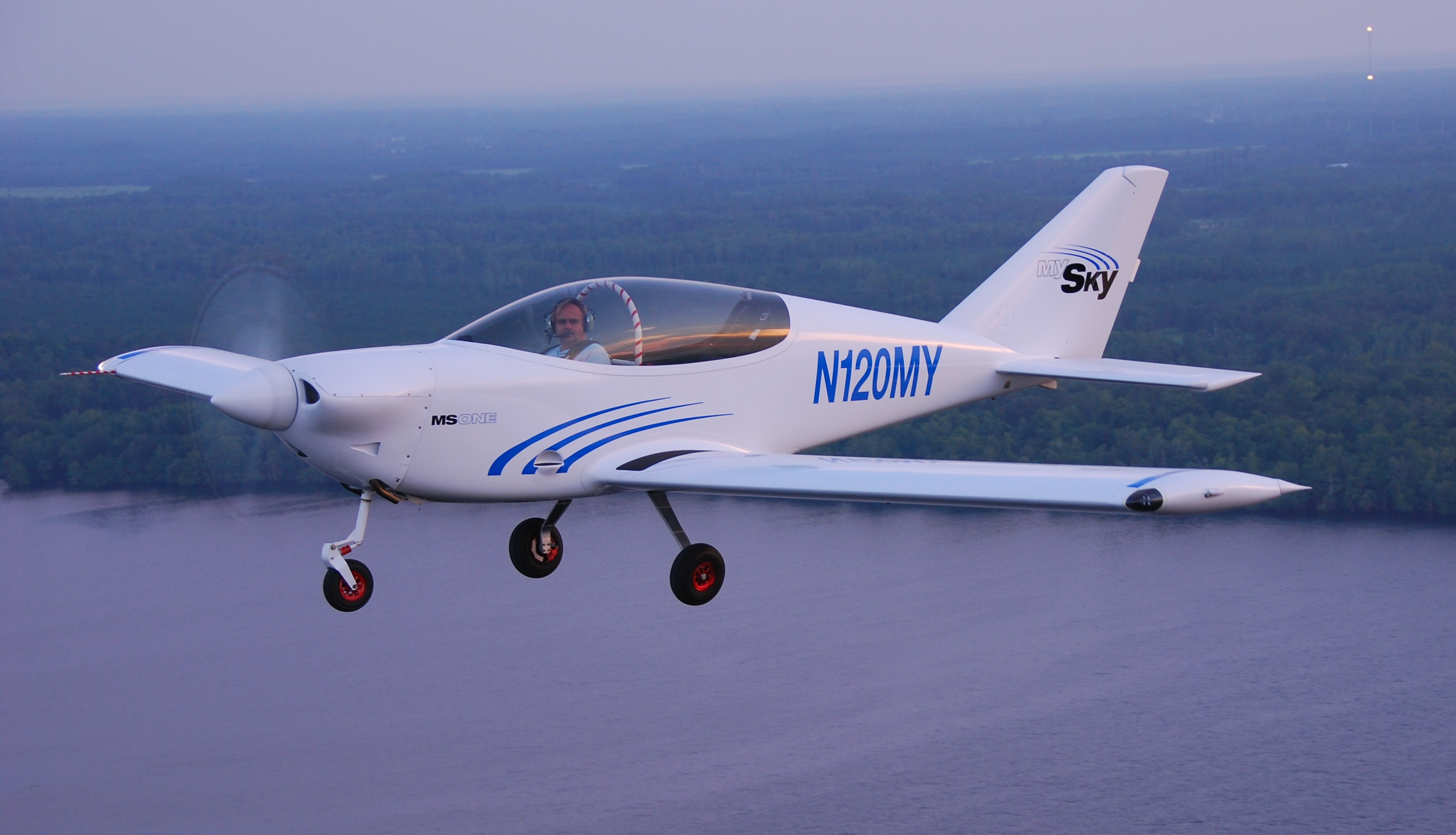
- Prototype MySky MS One

General information
- Type: Light-sport aircraft
- National origin: United States
- Manufacturer: MySky Aircraft
- Status: In production (2012)

History
- Introduction date: 2009

The MySky MS One is an American light-sport aircraft, designed and produced by MySky Aircraft of Port Orange, Florida. The aircraft was introduced at AirVenture in 2009. The MS One is supplied as a complete ready-to-fly-aircraft.

== Design and development ==
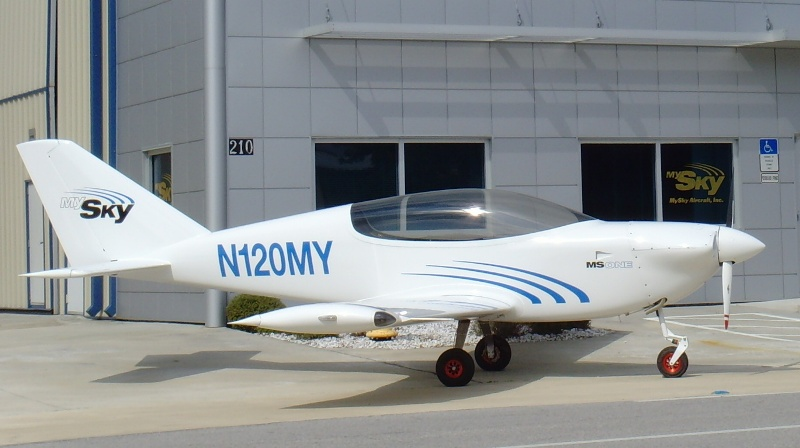
The prototype MS One in front of the MySky Aircraft factory

The aircraft was designed to comply with the US light-sport aircraft rules. It features a cantilever low-wing, a two-seats-in-tandem enclosed cockpit under a bubble canopy, fixed tricycle landing gear and a single engine in tractor configuration.

The MS One is made from composites. Its 30 ft (9.1 m) span wing has an area of 125 sq ft (11.6 m^{2}) and flaps. The standard engine available is the 120 hp (89 kW) Jabiru 3300 four-stroke powerplant, although engines of up to 250 hp (186 kW) can be fitted. The airframe was engineered for +/-10g.

The original intention was to have the design as an accepted LSA in 2010, but plans were delayed by the economic situation. As of February 2017, the design does not appear on the Federal Aviation Administration's list of approved special light-sport aircraft.

== Specifications (MS One) ==
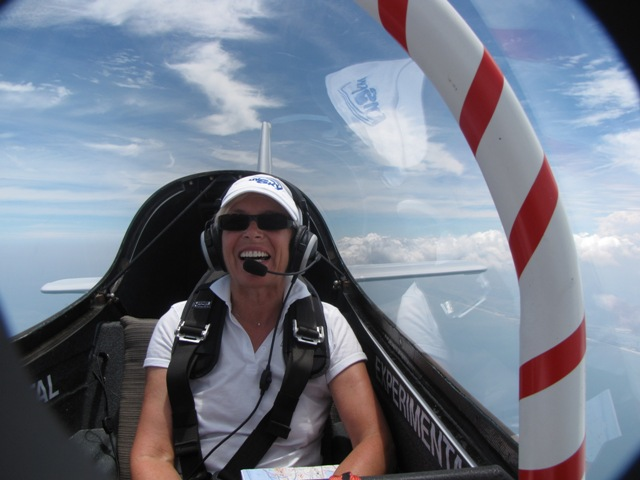
Rear cockpit of the MS One

Data from Bayerl

General characteristics

- Crew: one
- Capacity: one passenger
- Wingspan: 30 ft 0 in (9.14 m)
- Wing area: 125 sq ft (11.6 m^{2})
- Empty weight: 710 lb (322 kg)
- Gross weight: 1,323 lb (600 kg)
- Fuel capacity: 24 U.S. gallons (91 L; 20 imp gal)
- Powerplant: 1 × Jabiru 3300 six cylinder, air-cooled, four stroke aircraft engine, 120 hp (89 kW)
- Propellers: 2-bladed Sensenich composite

Performance

- Maximum speed: 140 mph (220 km/h, 120 kn)
- Cruise speed: 120 mph (200 km/h, 110 kn)
- Stall speed: 52 mph (83 km/h, 45 kn)
- Wing loading: 10.6 lb/sq ft (51.7 kg/m^{2})
