= Albaviation D24 MagicOne =

Italian ultralight aircraft

D24 MagicOne

General information
- Type: Ultralight aircraft
- National origin: Italy
- Manufacturer: Albaviation
- Status: In production (2017)

The Albaviation D24 MagicOne is an Italian ultralight aircraft designed and produced by Albaviation. The company was at one time located in Corropoli, but is now in Montegiorgio. The aircraft is supplied as a kit for amateur construction or complete and ready-to-fly.

== Design and development ==
The D24 MagicOne was designed to comply with the Fédération Aéronautique Internationale microlight rules. It features a strut-braced high-wing, an enclosed cabin with two-seats-in-side-by-side configuration, accessed by doors, fixed tricycle landing gear and a single engine in tractor configuration.

The aircraft is made from aluminium sheet. Its 9.00 m (29.5 ft) span wing employs fowler flaps and has a fixed 70% span leading edge slot. Standard engines available are the 100 hp (75 kW) Rotax 912ULS, 85 hp (63 kW) Jabiru 2200 and the 120 hp (89 kW) Jabiru 3300 four-stroke powerplants. With a laminar flow airfoil the design has a high cruise speed for the installed power.

== Specifications (D24 MagicOne) ==
Data from Tacke and manufacturer

General characteristics

- Crew: one
- Capacity: one passenger
- Length: 7.20 m (23 ft 7 in)
- Wingspan: 9.00 m (29 ft 6 in)
- Height: 2.30 m (7 ft 7 in)
- Empty weight: 280 kg (617 lb)
- Gross weight: 450 kg (992 lb)
- Fuel capacity: 95 litres (21 imp gal; 25 US gal)
- Powerplant: 1 × Rotax 912ULS four cylinder, liquid and air-cooled, four stroke aircraft engine, 75 kW (101 hp)
- Propellers: 2-bladed composite

Performance

- Maximum speed: 240 km/h (150 mph, 130 kn)
- Cruise speed: 225 km/h (140 mph, 121 kn)
- Stall speed: 50 km/h (31 mph, 27 kn) flaps down
- Rate of climb: 7 m/s (1,400 ft/min)
