= Flaeming Air FA 04 Peregrine =

German ultralight aircraft

FA 04 Peregrine
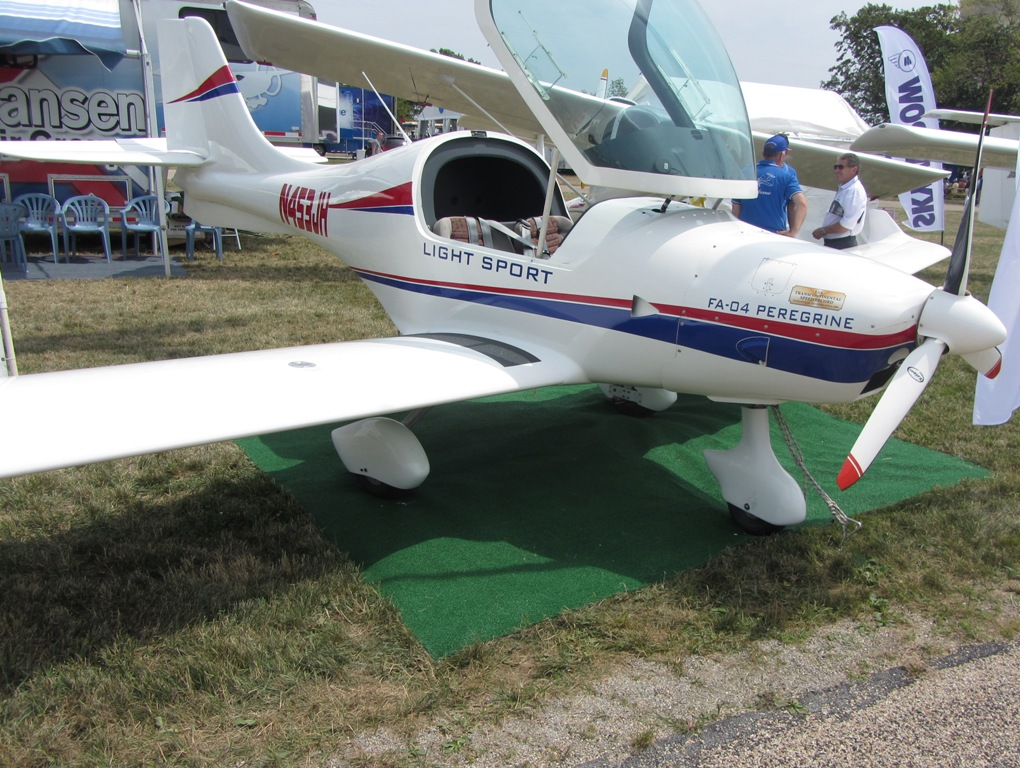

General information
- Type: Ultralight aircraft and Light-sport aircraft
- National origin: Germany
- Manufacturer: Flaeming Air
- Status: In production

The Flaeming Air FA 04 Peregrine is a German ultralight and light-sport aircraft, designed and produced by Flaeming Air of Zellendorf, Brandenburg. The aircraft is supplied as a complete ready-to-fly-aircraft.

== Design and development ==
The aircraft was designed to comply with the Fédération Aéronautique Internationale microlight rules and US light-sport aircraft rules, with different models for each category. It features a cantilever low-wing, a two-seats-in-side-by-side configuration enclosed cockpit under a bubble canopy, fixed tricycle landing gear, or optionally conventional landing gear and a single engine in tractor configuration.

The aircraft is made from composites, with its fuselage, wing spars, flaps and rudder made from carbon fibre. Its 10.05 m (33.0 ft) span wing has an area of 9.27 m^{2} (99.8 sq ft). The standard engines available are the 100 hp (75 kW) Rotax 912ULS, 120 hp (89 kW) Jabiru 3300 and the 100 hp (75 kW) Continental O-200 four-stroke powerplants.

The FA 04 can be used for aero-towing gliders up to 750 kg (1,653 lb) gross weight.

== Variants ==
FA 01 Smaragd (Emerald)
Initial model for the European FAI microlight class, with a gross weight of 472.5 kg (1,042 lb).
FA 02
Kit aircraft with a gross weight of 650 kg (1,433 lb).
FA 04 Peregrine
Light-sport model for the US market, with a gross weight of 600 kg (1,323 lb).
FA 04 SL
Super-light model with an empty weight of 270 kg (595 lb), including a ballistic parachute.

== Specifications (FA 04 Peregrine) ==
Data from Bayerl and Flaeming Air

General characteristics

- Crew: one
- Capacity: one passenger
- Length: 6.15 m (20 ft 2 in)
- Wingspan: 9.27 m (30 ft 5 in)
- Wing area: 10.05 m^{2} (108.2 sq ft)
- Empty weight: 278 kg (613 lb)
- Gross weight: 472.5 kg (1,042 lb)
- Fuel capacity: 120 litres (26 imp gal; 32 US gal)
- Powerplant: 1 × Rotax 912ULS four cylinder, liquid and air-cooled, four stroke aircraft engine, 75 kW (101 hp)

Performance

- Maximum speed: 230 km/h (140 mph, 120 kn)
- Cruise speed: 220 km/h (140 mph, 120 kn)
- Stall speed: 65 km/h (40 mph, 35 kn)
- Never exceed speed: 270 km/h (170 mph, 150 kn)
- Range: 1,150 km (710 mi, 620 nmi)
- Rate of climb: 6 m/s (1,200 ft/min)
