= Aerocomp VM-1 Esqual =

VM-1 Esqual
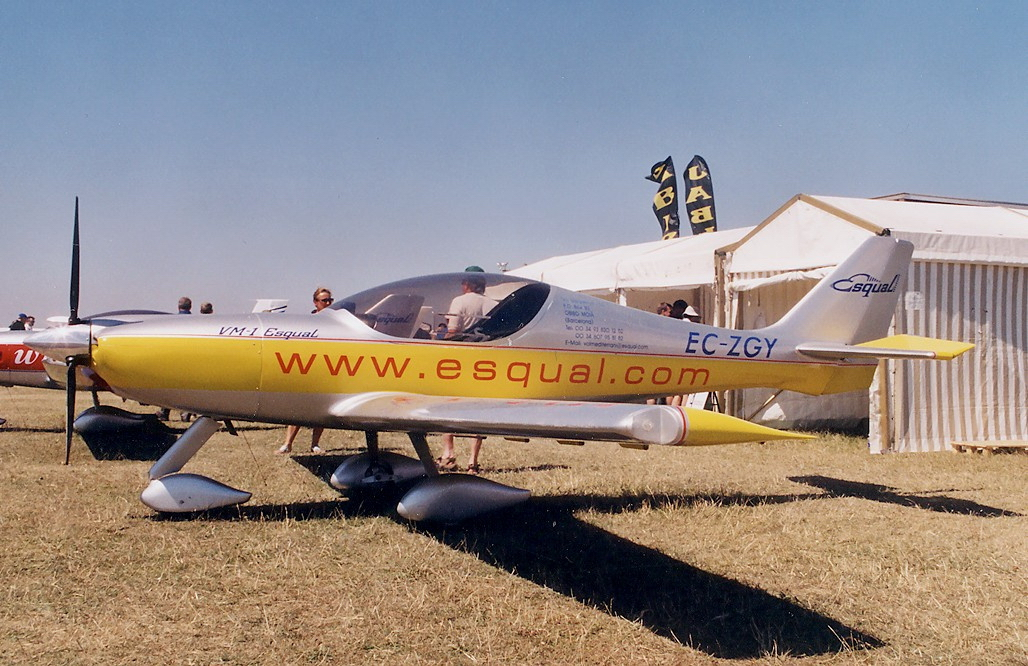
- Vol Mediterrani VM-1 Esqual

General information
- Type: Ultralight aircraft
- National origin: Sweden
- Manufacturer: Vol Mediterrani; Aerocomp AB; Arsi AB
- Status: In production

History
- Variant: Arion Lightning

The Aerocomp VM-1 Esqual is a Swedish ultralight aircraft, produced by Arsi AB (formerly Aerocomp AB) of Alingsås. The aircraft is supplied as a kit for amateur construction or as a complete ready-to-fly-aircraft.

== Design and development ==
The aircraft was originally designed in Spain by Vol Mediterrani to comply with the Fédération Aéronautique Internationale microlight rules and production was later moved to Sweden. It features a cantilever low-wing, a two-seats-in-side-by-side configuration enclosed cockpit, tricycle landing gear or conventional landing gear and a single engine in tractor configuration. Early versions used conventional landing gear but the current manufacturer is producing the nosewheel version. A retractable gear version is under development.

The aircraft is made from high density PVC foam and epoxy resin composites. Standard engines available are the 100 hp (75 kW) Rotax 912S, 85 hp (63 kW) Jabiru 2200, 120 hp (89 kW) Jabiru 3300 and the 95 hp (71 kW) ULPower UL260i four-stroke powerplants. The landing gear is made from 7175-T6 aluminum alloy and employs a freely-castering nosewheel and main wheels brakes for steering. The wing features electrically actuated flaps. Manual trim is standard with electric trim optional.

== Specifications (VM-1 Esqual) ==
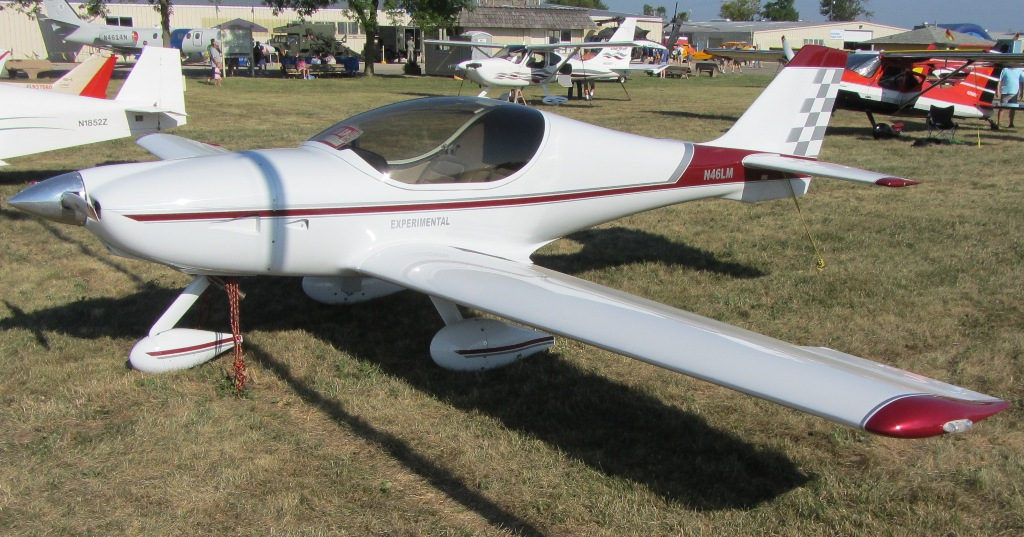
Esqual VM-1 Esqual

Data from Bayerl and Aerocomp AB

General characteristics

- Crew: one
- Capacity: one passenger
- Length: 6.08 m (19 ft 11 in)
- Wingspan: 9.10 m (29 ft 10 in)
- Height: 1.94 m (6 ft 4 in)
- Wing area: 9.00 m^{2} (96.9 sq ft)
- Empty weight: 265 kg (584 lb)
- Gross weight: 450 kg (992 lb)
- Fuel capacity: 100 litres (22 imp gal; 26 US gal)
- Powerplant: 1 × Rotax 912ULS four cylinder, liquid and air-cooled, four stroke, 75 kW (101 hp)

Performance

- Cruise speed: 230 km/h (140 mph, 120 kn)
- Stall speed: 62 km/h (39 mph, 33 kn)
- Never exceed speed: 320 km/h (200 mph, 170 kn)

== See also ==
Related development

- Arion Lightning
