= Arion Lightning =

Light-sport aircraft

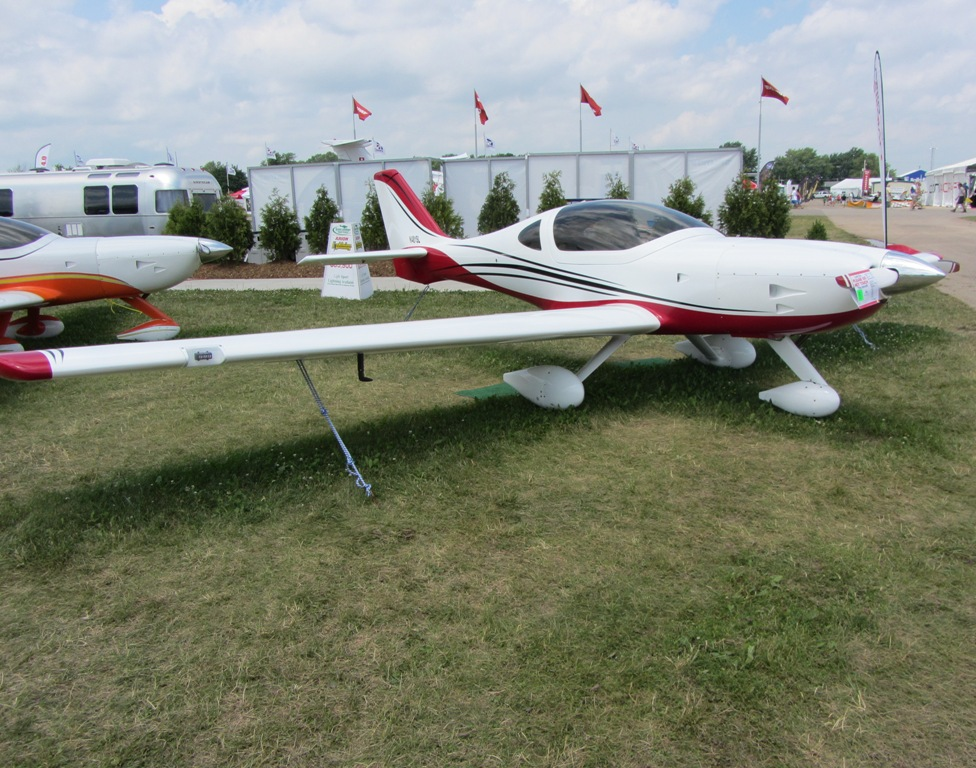
- Arion Lightning

General information
- Type: Homebuilt aircraft
- National origin: United States of America
- Manufacturer: Arion Aircraft
- Designer: Pete Krotje, Ben Krotje and Nick Otterback
- Number built: 150 (2012)

History
- Introduction date: April 2006
- First flight: 3 March 2006

The Arion Lightning is a light-sport aircraft available as a kit aircraft or as a production Special LSA.

== Design and development ==
The Lightning was developed by designers Pete Krotje, Ben Krotje and Nick Otterback.

Originally designed as a high speed, low wing composite aircraft for the Jabiru series of engines, the LS-1 was redesigned to meet American light-sport requirements by extending the wings to lower the stall speed and using a fixed pitch propeller.

The aircraft is made from composites. In the homebuilt kit version its 30.5 ft (9.3 m) span wing has an area of 91 sq ft (8.5 m^{2}) and mounts flaps. The aircraft's recommended engine power is 120 hp (89 kW) and the standard engine used is the 120 hp (89 kW) Jabiru 3300 four-stroke powerplant. Construction time from the supplied kit is 600 hours.

== Operational history ==
In 2007 Earl Ferguson set a record for the quickest time for a flight from Savannah to San Diego in a piston engine land plane weighing between 1,102 and 2,205 pounds using this aircraft.

== Variants ==
Arion Lightning EXP
US Experimental amateur-built category aircraft
Arion Lightning XS
Variant of Lightning EXP supporting up to 160 hp engines, including the Lycoming O-320 and ULPower 390iS.
Arion Lightning LS-1

This is Arion's Light Sport variant. It uses the Jabiru 3300, 120 HP. No other engine is offered in the Light Sport variant .

Light-sport aircraft variant with a choice of engines: the 120 hp (89 kW) Jabiru 3300, the 150 hp (112 kW) Lycoming O-320 or the 210 hp (157 kW) Lycoming IO-390.

== Specifications (Arion Lightning LS-1) ==
Data from Arion Aircraft

General characteristics

- Capacity: 2
- Length: 20 ft 8 in (6.30 m)
- Wingspan: 30 ft 6 in (9.30 m)
- Height: 6 ft 6 in (1.98 m)
- Wing area: 104 sq ft (9.7 m^{2})
- Empty weight: 820 lb (372 kg)
- Gross weight: 1,320 lb (599 kg) Kit aircraft 1530lbs
- Fuel capacity: 22 U.S. gallons (83 L) or 30 gallon option
- Powerplant: 1 × Jabiru 3300 , 120 hp (89 kW)

Performance

- Maximum speed: 140 kn (160 mph, 260 km/h) 160knts KIT
- Cruise speed: 120 kn (140 mph, 220 km/h) 140knts kit
- Stall speed: 38 kn (44 mph, 70 km/h) 45knts clean
- Never exceed speed: 180 kn (210 mph, 330 km/h)
- Range: 520 nmi (600 mi, 970 km)
- Service ceiling: 16,000 ft (4,900 m)
- Rate of climb: 1,200 ft/min (6.1 m/s) 1500 solo

== See also ==
Related development

- Aerocomp VM-1 Esqual
- Bye Aerospace eFlyer 2
