= BRM Land Africa =

Portuguese ultralight aircraft

Land Africa
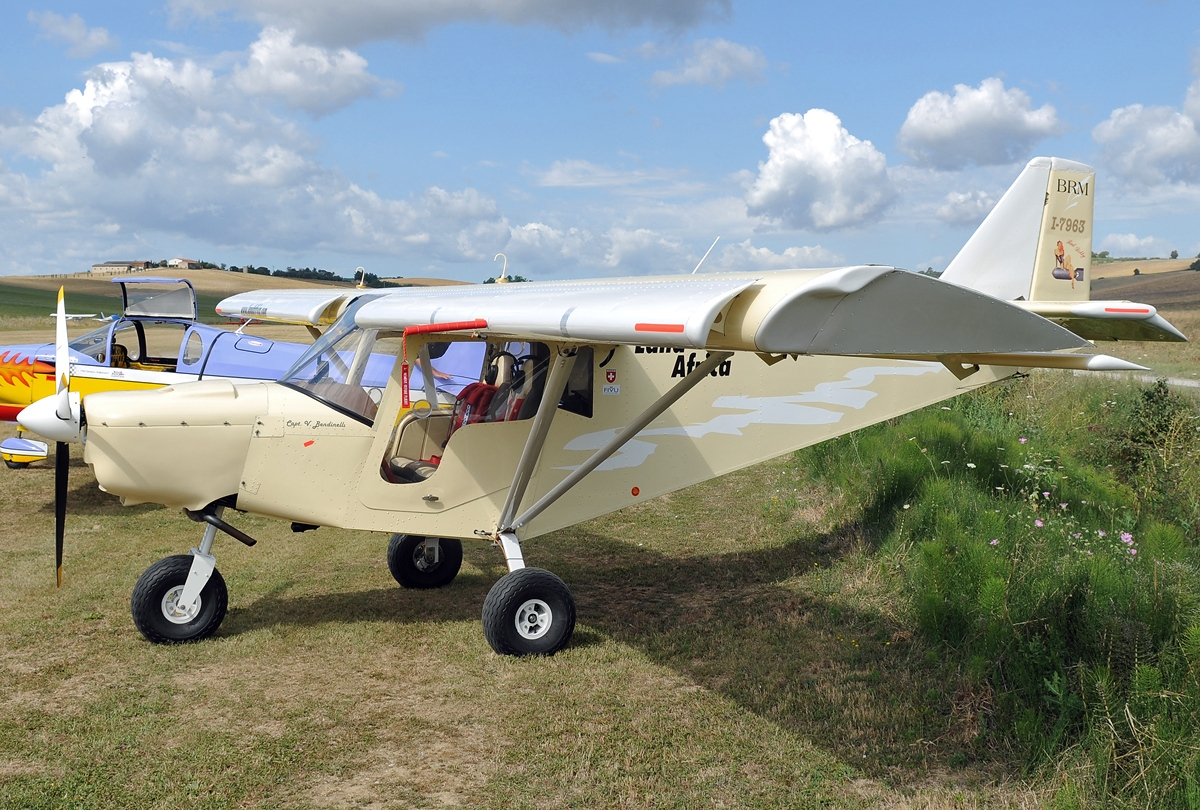

General information
- Type: Ultralight aircraft
- National origin: Portugal
- Manufacturer: BRM Costruções Aeronáuticas
- Status: In production
- Number built: a

History
- Developed from: Zenith STOL CH 701

The BRM Land Africa is a Portuguese ultralight aircraft, designed and produced by BRM Costruções Aeronáuticas. The aircraft is supplied as a kit for amateur construction or as a complete ready-to-fly-aircraft.

Chris Heintz, the designer of the Zenith STOL CH 701 considers the Land Africa an unauthorized copy of the CH 701. The Land Africa varies from CH 701 in having a wider and longer cockpit.

== Design and development ==
The aircraft was designed to comply with the Fédération Aéronautique Internationale microlight rules. It features a strut-braced high-wing, a two-seats-in-side-by-side configuration enclosed cockpit, fixed tricycle landing gear and a single engine in tractor configuration.

The aircraft is made from aluminum sheet. Its 8.63 m (28.3 ft) span wing has an area of 18.08 m^{2} (194.6 sq ft) and features large flaps as well as leading edge slots. Standard engines available are the 80 hp (60 kW) Rotax 912UL and the 100 hp (75 kW) Rotax 912ULS four-stroke powerplants.

In 2009 a new faster wing option was introduced that increases the top speed by about 25 km/h (16 mph), while retaining the same low stall speed.

The Land Africa replaced the earlier BRM Okavango in production.

== Specifications (Land Africa) ==
Data from Bayerland and BRM Costruções Aeronáuticas

General characteristics

- Crew: two
- Capacity: two passengers (one pilot)
- Wingspan: 8.63 m (28 ft 4 in)
- Wing area: 18.08 m^{2} (194.6 sq ft)
- Empty weight: 270 kg (595 lb)
- Gross weight: 450 kg (992 lb)
- Fuel capacity: 72 litres (16 imp gal; 19 US gal)
- Powerplant: 1 × Rotax 912ULS four cylinder, liquid and air-cooled, four stroke aircraft engine, 75 kW (101 hp)
- Propellers: 3-bladed (carbon fiber)-bladed

Performance

- Maximum speed: 200 km/h (120 mph, 110 kn)
- Cruise speed: 175 km/h (109 mph, 94 kn)
- Stall speed: 40 km/h (25 mph, 22 kn)
- Never exceed speed: 175 km/h (109 mph, 94 kn)
- Service ceiling: 640 m (2,100 ft)
- g limits: +4/-2
- Rate of climb: 2 m/s (390 ft/min)
