= Jabiru 1600 =

1990s Australian piston aircraft engine

1600
- Type: Piston aero engine
- National origin: Australia
- Manufacturer: Jabiru Aircraft
- Developed into: Jabiru 2200

The Jabiru 1600 is a horizontally opposed direct drive four-stroke, air-cooled aircraft piston engine produced by Jabiru Aircraft.

== Design and development ==
Jabiru designed and built the Jabiru 1600 to power the light sport aircraft it produced when it could not obtain supplies of the Italian KFM 112M engine used to power its early production aircraft. The 1600 was approved in Australia in November 1993 and was used on Jabiru production aircraft.

In November 2014 the Australian Civil Aviation Safety Authority proposed restricting all Jabiru-powered aircraft to day-visual flight rules only, without passengers or solo students and within gliding distance of a safe place to land due to the engine line's safety record. Both the manufacturer and Recreational Aviation Australia opposed the restrictions as unnecessary and unwarranted. The final rule adopted somewhat softened the restrictions, allowing the carriage of passengers and students, but requiring them to sign an acknowledgement of risk before flying and restricting equipped aircraft to day VFR flight and within gliding distance of a safe place to land.

== Specifications ==
=== General characteristics ===
- Type: Flat-4
- Bore: 88.0 mm (3.465 in)
- Stroke: 66.0 mm (2.598 in)
- Displacement: 1606 cm³ (98.004 in³)
- Length: 532 mm (20.9 in)
- Width: 574 mm (22.6 in)
- Height: 472 mm (18.6 in)
- Dry weight: 54 kg (119.0 lbs) dry, equipped

=== Components ===
- Cooling system: Air-cooled

=== Performance ===
- Power output: 45 kW (60 hp) at 3,300 RPM

== See also ==
Comparable engines

- KFM 112M

Related lists

- List of aircraft engines
