= Jabiru J160 =

Australian ultralight aircraft

J160
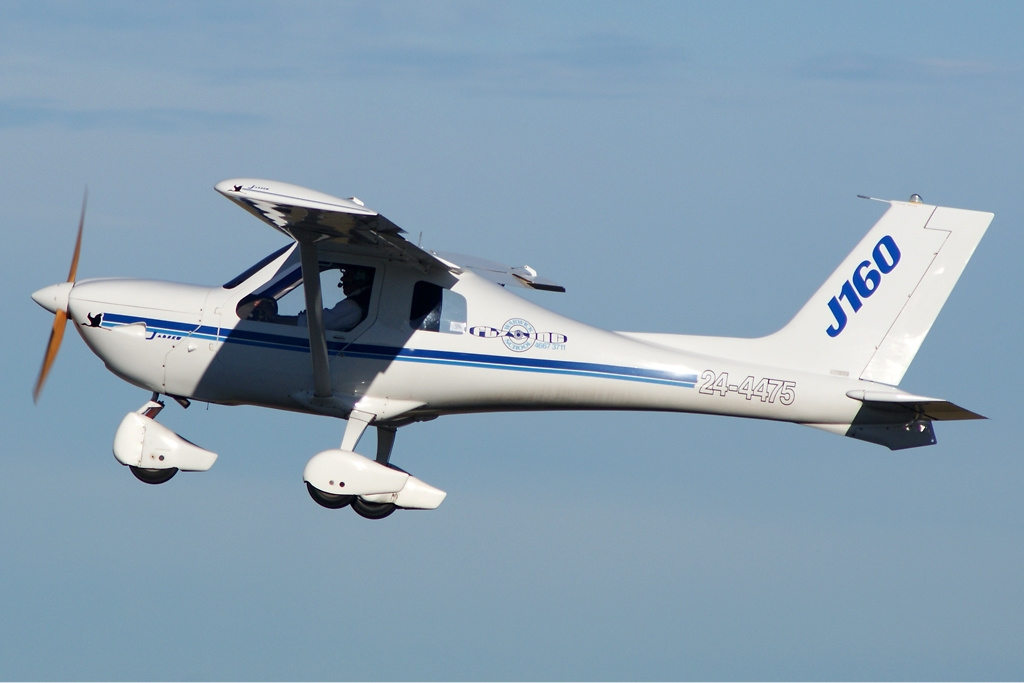
- J160-C

General information
- Type: Ultralight aircraft
- National origin: Australia
- Manufacturer: Jabiru Aircraft
- Status: In production (2015)

History
- Variant: Jabiru J170

The Jabiru J160 is an Australian ultralight trainer, designed and produced by Jabiru Aircraft of Bundaberg, Queensland. Certified in the Australian primary aircraft category, the aircraft is supplied complete and ready-to-fly.

== Design and development ==
The J160 features a strut-braced high-wing, an enclosed cabin with two-seats-in-side-by-side configuration accessed by doors, fixed tricycle landing gear and a single engine in tractor configuration.

The aircraft is made from composite materials. Its 8.12 m (26.6 ft) span wing has an area of 8.04 m^{2} (86.5 sq ft) and mounts flaps. The standard engine available is the 80 hp (60 kW) Jabiru 2200 four-stroke powerplant.

The design was developed into the Jabiru J170, by adding the wing from the Jabiru J430, for the light-sport aircraft category.

== Variants ==
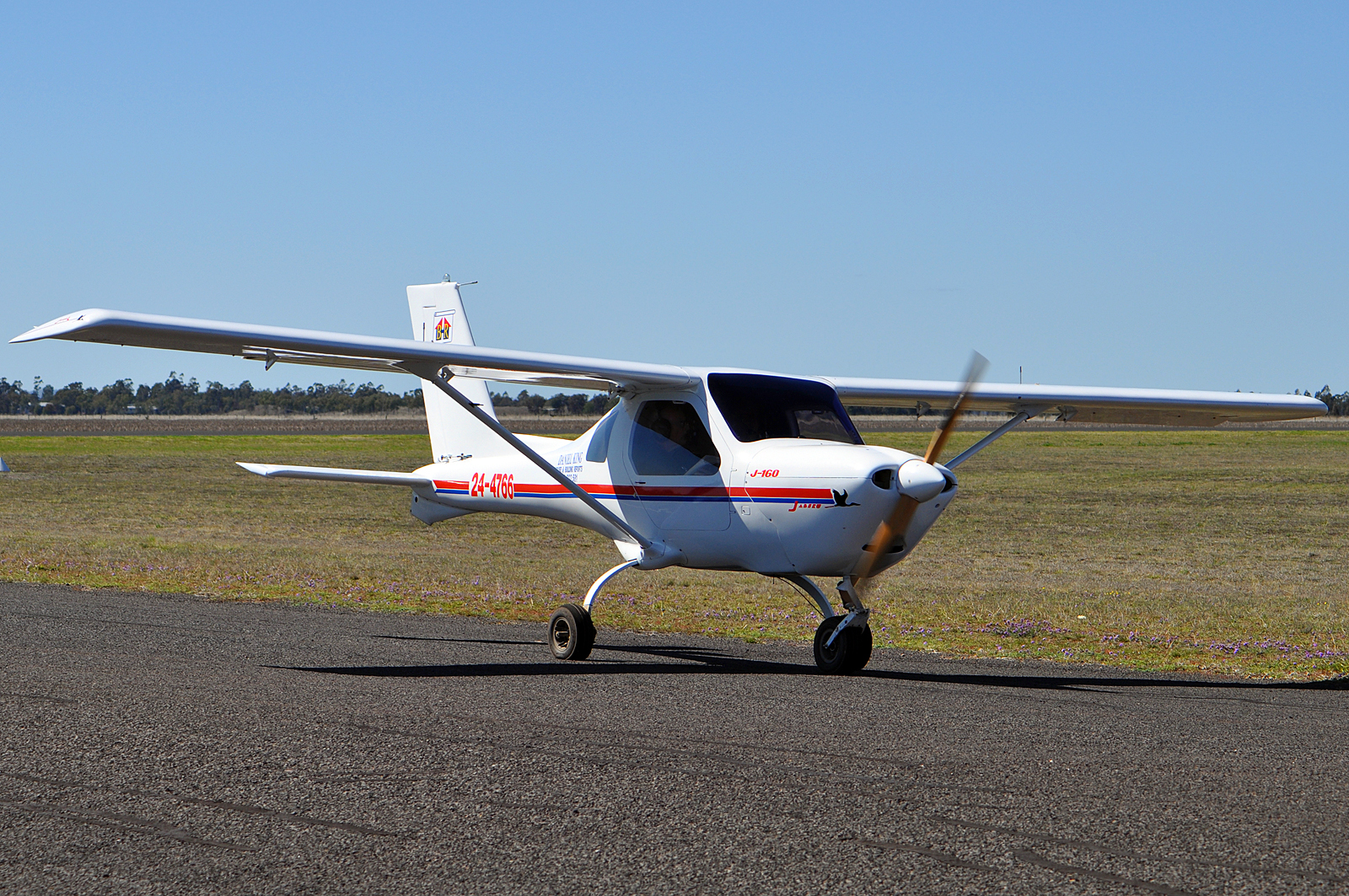
J160-C

J160-C
Early model
J160-D
Certified version

== Specifications (J160) ==
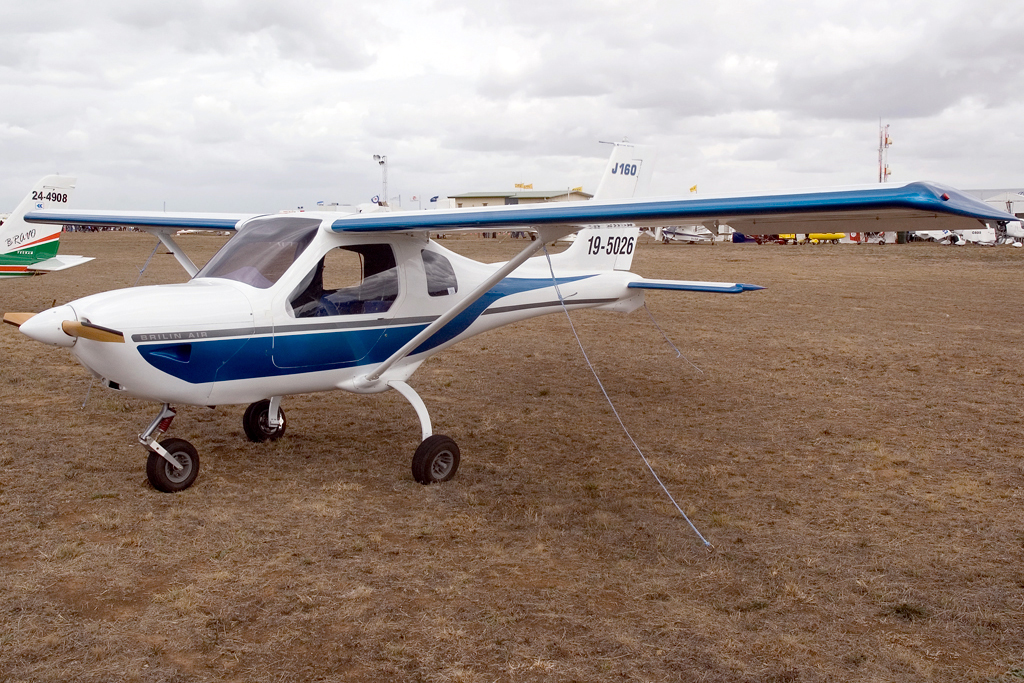
J160

Data from Tacke

General characteristics

- Crew: one
- Capacity: one passenger
- Wingspan: 8.12 m (26 ft 8 in)
- Wing area: 8.04 m^{2} (86.5 sq ft)
- Empty weight: 300 kg (661 lb)
- Gross weight: 540 kg (1,190 lb)
- Fuel capacity: 135 litres (30 imp gal; 36 US gal)
- Powerplant: 1 × Jabiru 2200 four cylinder, air-cooled, four stroke aircraft engine, 60 kW (80 hp)
- Propellers: 2-bladed wooden, fixed pitch

Performance

- Cruise speed: 185 km/h (115 mph, 100 kn)
- Stall speed: 84 km/h (52 mph, 45 kn)
- Wing loading: 67.2 kg/m^{2} (13.8 lb/sq ft)
