= Jabiru 3300 =

1990s Australian piston aircraft engine

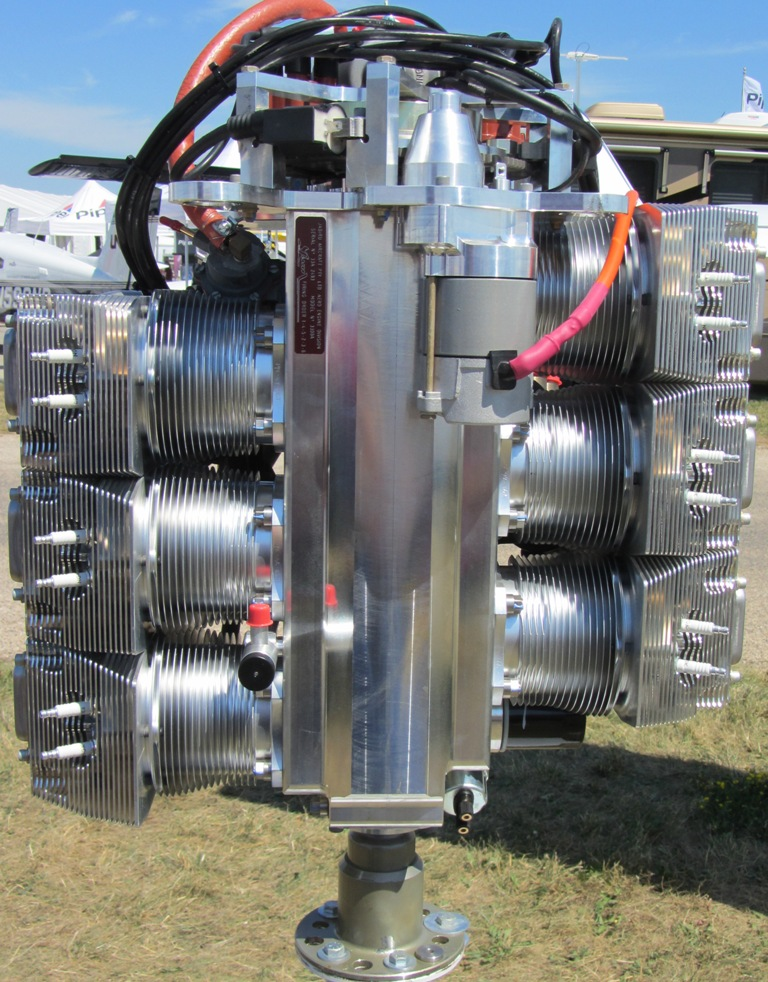
- Type: Piston aero engine
- National origin: Australia
- Manufacturer: Jabiru Aircraft
- Developed into: Jabiru 5100

The Jabiru 3300 is a lightweight four-stroke, horizontally opposed "flat-six" air-cooled aircraft engine produced by Jabiru Aircraft. The engines are direct drive and fitted with alternators, silencers, vacuum pump drives and dual ignition systems as standard. The engine is used to power homebuilt and ultralight aircraft.

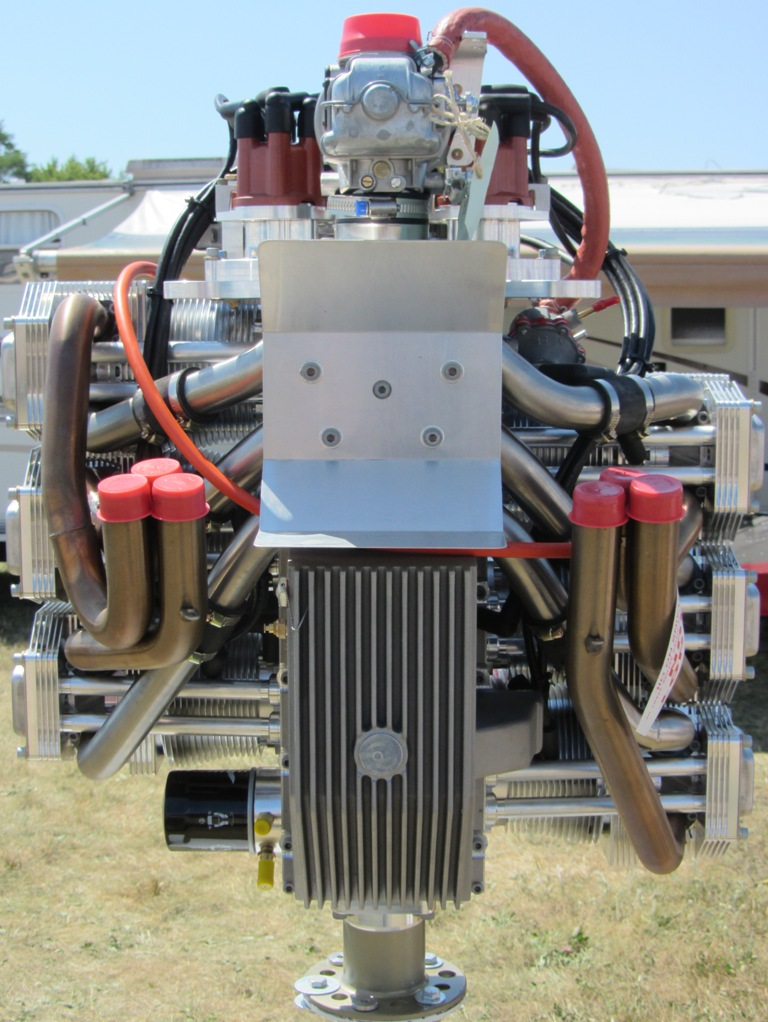
underside of a Jabiru 3300

== History ==
Jabiru Aircraft began as a builder of small two-seater aircraft in Bundaberg, Australia. It turned to producing its own engines when supplies of the Italian-sourced engines previously used dried up. Jabiru engines were designed to be manufactured in small batch quantities, so the firm used CNC machines to mill major engine parts such as cylinder blocks and heads, rather than using cast items. For the fourth generation of the design, more cast and forged components (including cast cylinder heads and forged connecting rods) replace components which were previously machined from billet. The 3300 is a modular development of Jabiru's flat-four 2200 engine.

In November 2014, the Australian Civil Aviation Safety Authority proposed restricting all Jabiru-powered aircraft to day-visual flight rules only, without passengers or solo students and within gliding distance of a safe place to land due to the engine line's safety record. This was in response to 46 reports of engine failure in flight. In-flight failure modes included, but were not limited to: fuel starvation; valve/port collapse & breakage of critical bolts. Both the manufacturer and Recreational Aviation Australia opposed the restrictions as unnecessary and unwarranted. The final rule adopted somewhat softened the restrictions, allowing the carriage of passengers and students, but requiring them to sign an acknowledgement of risk before flying and restricting equipped aircraft to day VFR flight and within gliding distance of a safe place to land.

A subsequent tear-down of one engine by CASA resulted in recommendations in June 2016 for further easing of the restrictions.

== Applications ==
- Aerocomp VM-1 Esqual
- Aeromarmi Stela M1
- Albaviation D24 MagicOne
- Alpi Pioneer 300
- Arion Lightning
- Australian Lightwing SP-2000 Speed
- BRM Argos
- Bushcaddy R-120
- Creative Flight Aerocat
- CZAW Parrot
- Europa XS
- Europa Classic
- Fisher Dakota Hawk
- Flaeming Air FA 04 Peregrine
- Ion Aircraft Ion
- Jabiru J230
- Jabiru J430
- Just Superstol
- MySky MS One
- Nexaer LS1
- Pulsar Aircraft Pulsar
- Rand Robinson KR-2S
- Sonex Aircraft Sonex
- Sonex Xenos
- Titan Tornado
- ULBI Wild Thing

== Specifications ==
=== General characteristics ===
- Type: Flat-6
- Bore: 97.5 mm (3.84 in)
- Stroke: 74 mm (2.91 in)
- Displacement: 3,300 cm³ (201.4 in³)
- Length: 671 mm (26.42 in)
- Width: 582 mm (22.91 in)
- Height: 445 mm (17.54 in)
- Dry weight: 81 kg (178 lbs) with exhaust, carburetors, starter motor, alternator & ignition system

=== Components ===
- Fuel system: Mechanical fuel pump
- Fuel type: AVGAS 100/130 or Auto Gas 91 MON (97 RON) Minimum
- Oil system: Wet sump
- Cooling system: Air-cooled, oil cooling (optional, but usually necessary)

=== Performance ===
- Power output: 79.8 kW (107 hp) at 2,750 RPM (continuous); 89.5 kW (120 hp) at 3,300 RPM (intermittent)
- Compression ratio: 8:1
- Power-to-weight ratio: 1.10 kW/kg

== See also ==
- Jabiru 2200
- CAMit 3300
- List of aircraft engines

Comparable engines:

- Continental O-200
- D-Motor LF39
- Lycoming IO-233
- Sauer S 2100 ULT
- ULPower UL390i
