= Jabiru Aircraft =

Australian aircraft manufacturer

Jabiru Aircraft Pty Ltd
- Type: Proprietary limited company
- Industry: Aerospace manufacturing
- Founded: 1988
- Headquarters: Bundaberg, Australia
- Key people: Rodney Stiff
- Products: Light aircraft and aircraft engines
- Website: www.jabiru.net.au

Jabiru Aircraft Pty Ltd is an Australian aircraft manufacturer that produces a range of kit- and ready-built civil light aircraft in Bundaberg, Queensland. The company also designs and manufactures a range of light aircraft engines. Types past and present include microlights (Ultralight or ULM), including the Calypso, two-seat trainers and recreational aircraft (J120/J160/ J170/J230) and four-seat aircraft (J400/J430/J450).

The aircraft are built largely of composite materials and are conventional high-wing monoplanes with typically tricycle undercarriage. Taildragger versions were produced in the early days of Jabiru. The wings could be removed for ease of storage or transportation.

Use of modern composite techniques has resulted in a strong yet light structure. The aircraft are designed around the pilot and passengers, being spacious and comfortable for touring, yet with a small footprint and frontal profile. Controls include a centrally mounted control column, brake and trim lever.

There is also a Jabiru assembly facility in George, Western Cape, South Africa.

== History ==
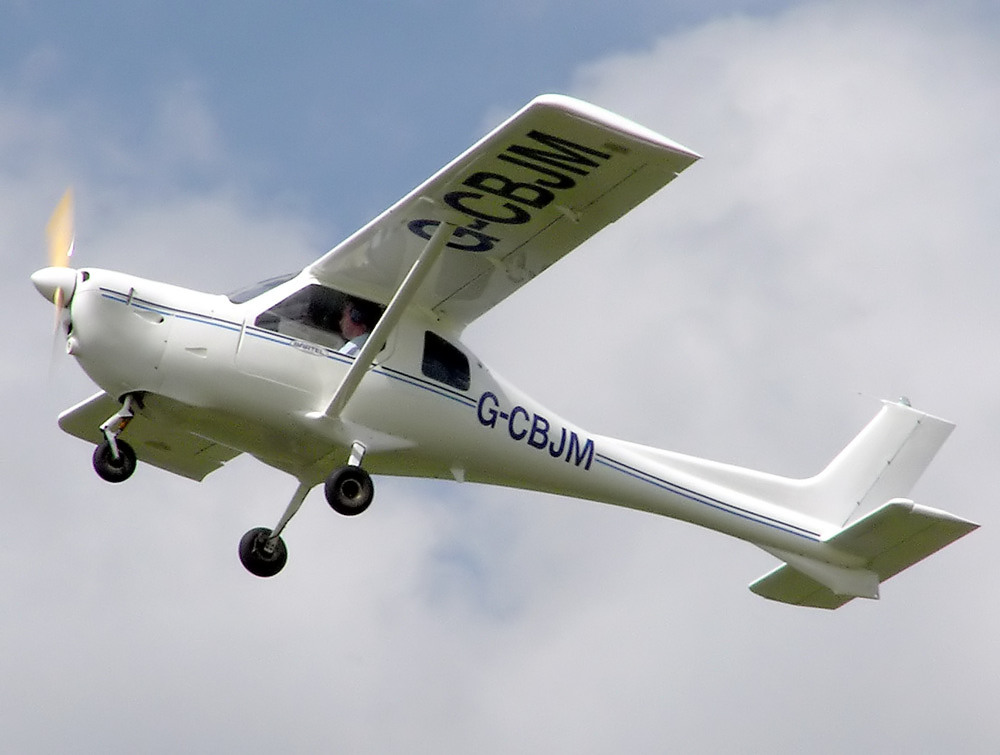
2001 model Jabiru SP-470

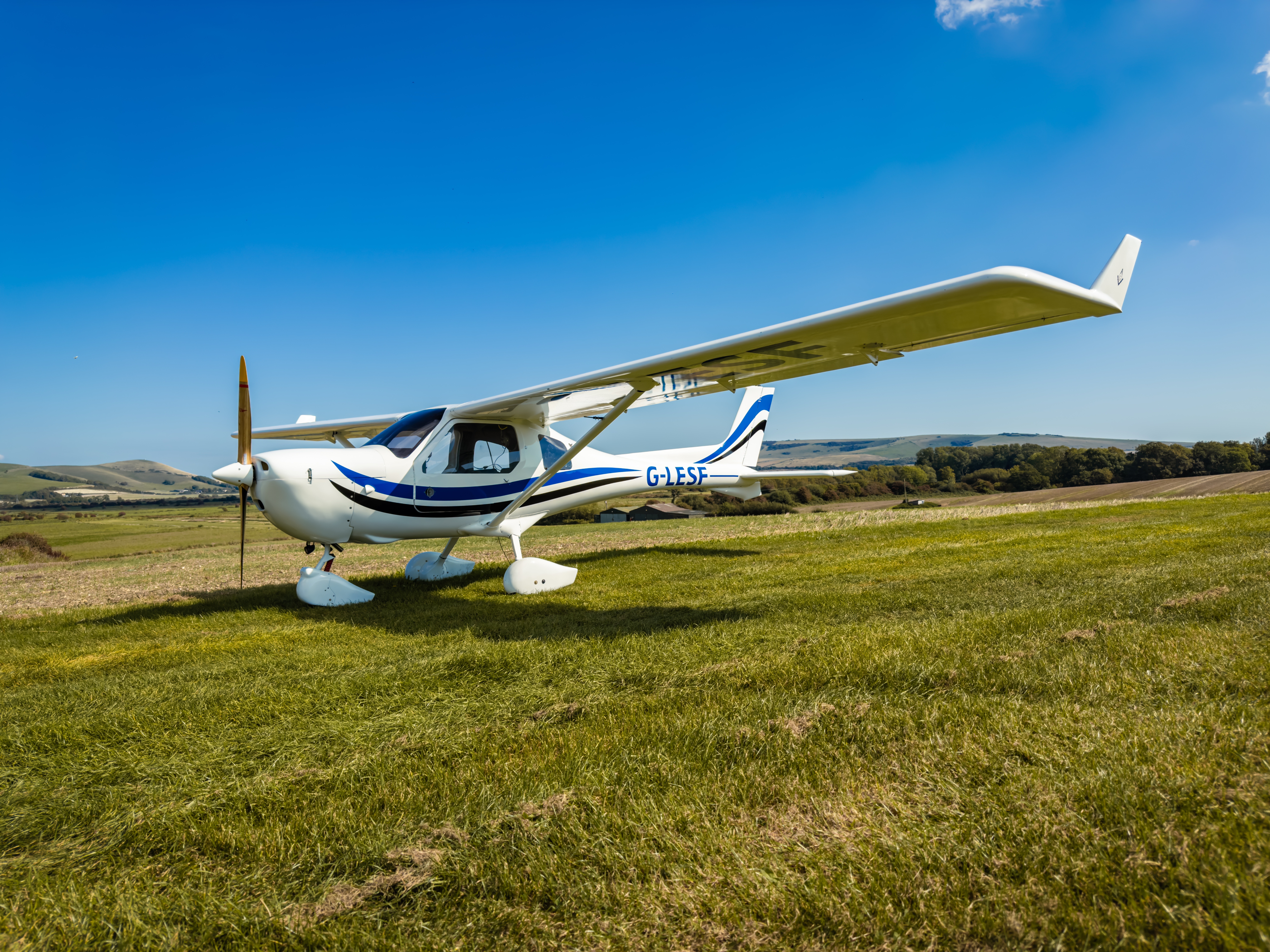
Jabiru UL-450 Microlight

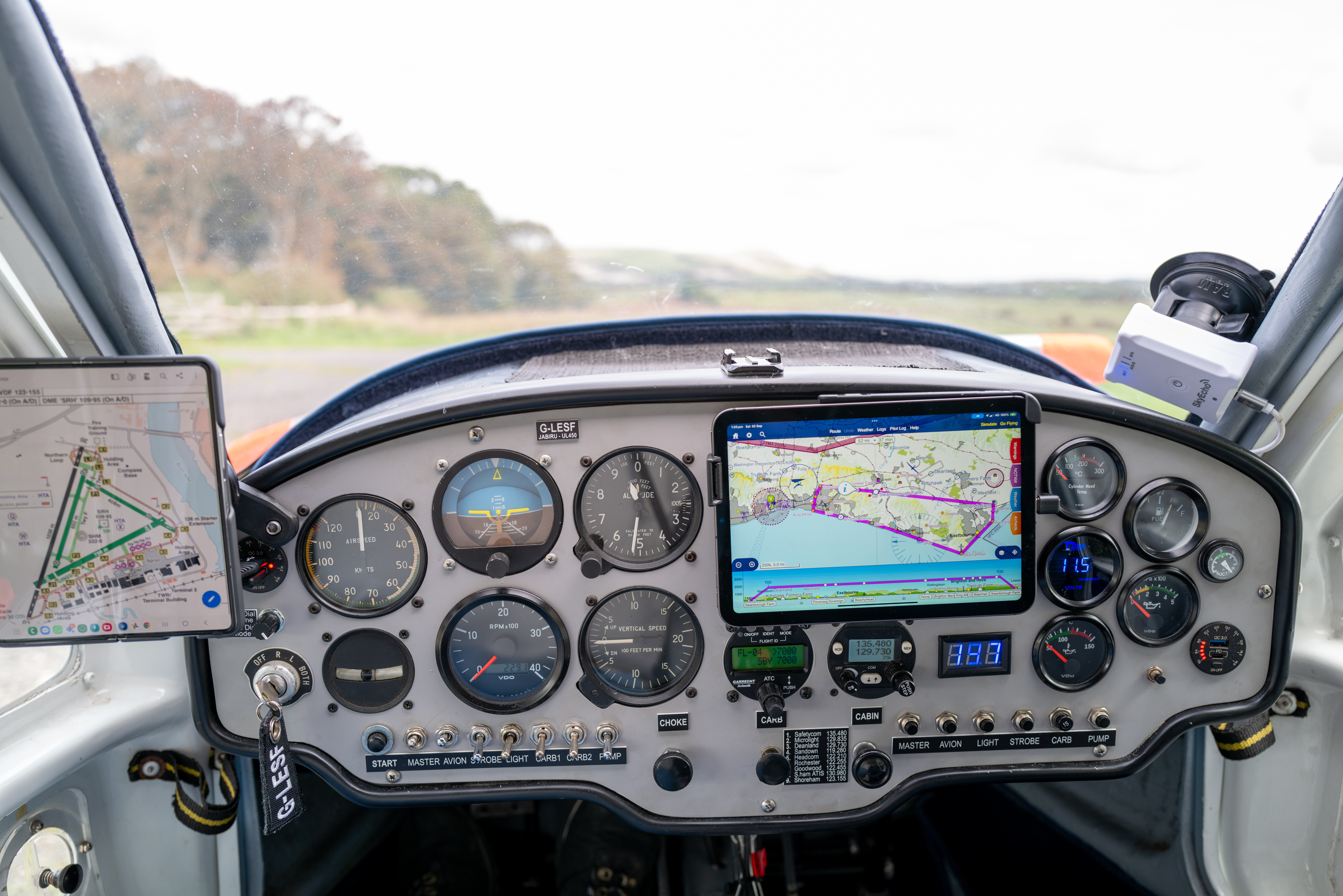
UL450 Interior

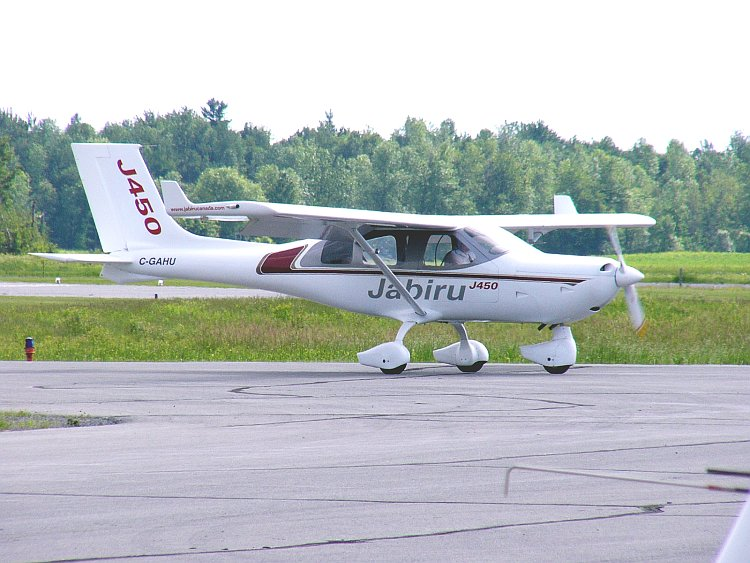
2004 model Jabiru J450

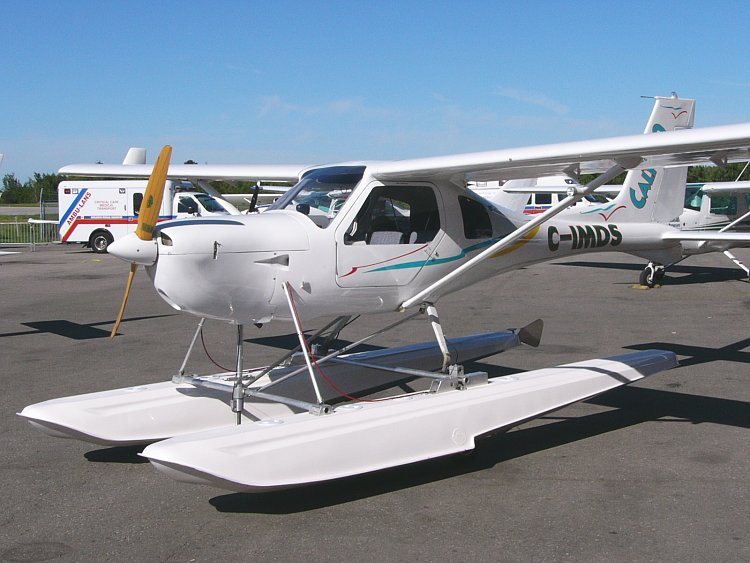
2003 model Jabiru Calypso 3300 on amphibious floats at the Canadian Aviation Expo, 2004

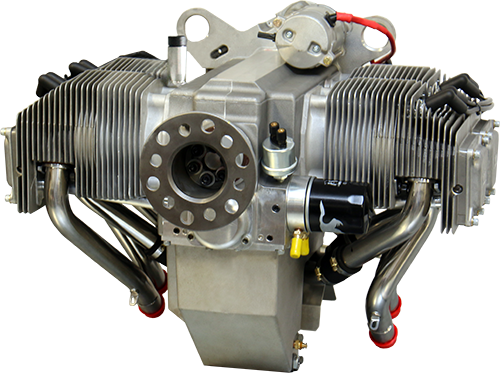
2200 4 Cylinder Engine

The company was formed in 1988 by Rodney Stiff and Phil Ainsworth to manufacture affordable light aircraft in kit and certified forms.

In October 1991, the first aircraft (Jabiru LSA 55/2k), was certified by the Australian Civil Aviation Authority.

Due to the original engine manufacturer, Italian American Motor Engineering ceasing production of the KFM 112M aero engines, the company started development of its own engines, and by 1995 the Jabiru 2200, a horizontally opposed four-cylinder air-cooled aviation engine, was available for delivery. Since then the six-cylinder Jabiru 3300 and eight-cylinder Jabiru 5100 have been added to the range.

Jabiru experimental light sport aircraft conducting pre-flight control checks

Also in 1995, it was decided to offer the aircraft range as amateur-build or experimental self-build kits.

The microlight version of the Jabiru two-seater aircraft, the Jabiru UL, holds two world speed records for three-axis microlight aircraft. These were set over 50- and 100-kilometre predefined courses and certified by the FAI (Fédération Aéronautique Internationale).

== Aircraft ==
=== Factory-built ===
==== Early Models ====
- LSA - configured to meet ultralight regulations
- ST3 - configured to meet general aviation regulations
- UL-D - configured to meet UK Microlight regulations

==== Current Models ====
- J120 - 2 seater with 80 hp engine
- J160 - 2 seater with 80 hp engine
- J170 - 2 seater with 80 hp engine
- J230 - 2 seater with 120 hp engine
- J432 - 2 seater with twin offset 80 hp engines

=== Kitplanes ===
==== Early Models ====
- SP - Light aircraft version
- SP-T - Taildragger version of SP
- UL - export version to meet European microlight regulations (Calypso)
- UL-T - taildragger version of UL
- SK - two-seat aircraft (group A version)
- J200 - two-seat aircraft
- J400 - four-seat aircraft
- J450 - four-seat aircraft with STOL wing

==== Current Models ====
- J430 - four-seat aircraft with winglets for best compromise between STOL performance and speed

== Engines ==
Jabiru produces its own range of lightweight, four-stroke, horizontally opposed, air-cooled engines, specifically designed and engineered for use in aircraft. All engines are direct drive and are fitted with alternators, mufflers, and dual ignition systems as standard. Over 3,900 four-cylinder engines and over 2,900 of the six-cylinder engines have been produced.

=== Early Models ===
- Jabiru 1600; 60 hp (45 kW) four-cylinder horizontally opposed engine
- Jabiru 5100; 180 hp (134 kW) eight-cylinder horizontally opposed engine

=== Current Models ===
- Jabiru 2200; 80 hp (60 kW) or four-cylinder horizontally opposed engine
- Jabiru 3300; 120 hp (89 kW) six-cylinder horizontally opposed engine

In November 2014, the Australian Civil Aviation Safety Authority (CASA) required passengers to sign an acknowledgement of risk before flying, and restricted IFR-equipped aircraft to day VFR flight within gliding distance of a safe place to land. In the following two years, CASA inspectors witnessed the tear-downs of failed Jabiru engines and also high-time engines that had not failed. In 2016, this resulted in exemptions to these restrictions for all aircraft that complied with the manufacturer's engine maintenance manuals, service letters, bulletins, flight operation manuals and that had no unapproved modifications.

Both the manufacturer and Recreational Aviation Australia (RA-Aus) opposed the restrictions as unnecessary and unwarranted. RA-Aus reported that it was supplied with only a fraction of CASA's source data – just a day before submissions closed – and that CASA seemed to have excluded all engine reliability data post-"early 2014".

== See also ==
- List of aircraft manufacturers
- List of aircraft engine manufacturers
