= Jabiru J170 =

Australian ultralight aircraft

J170
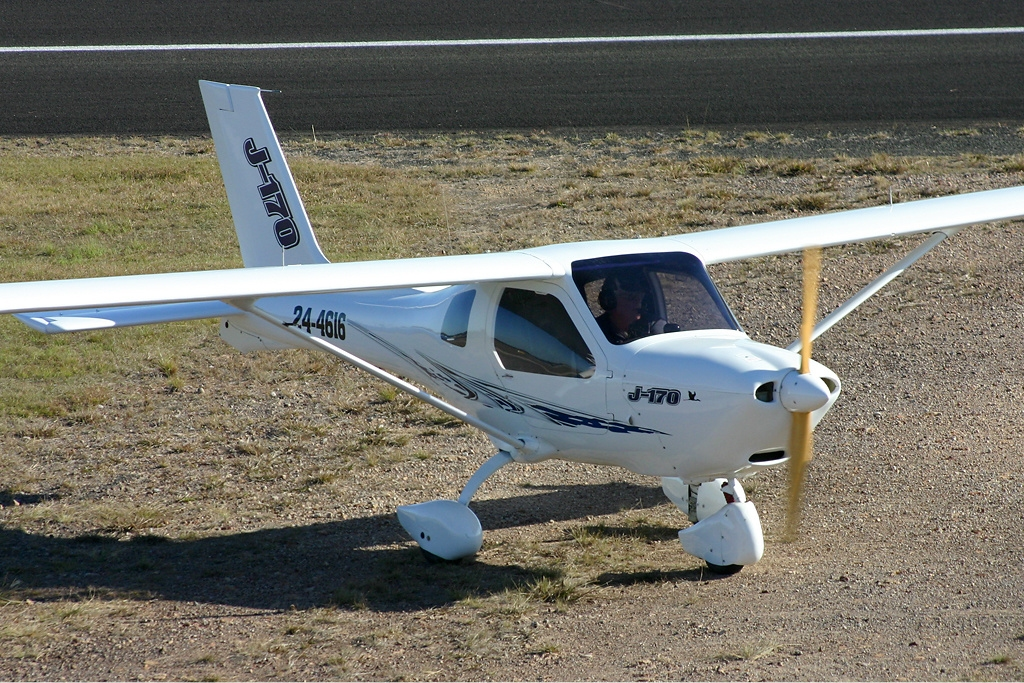

General information
- Type: Ultralight aircraft and Light-sport aircraft
- National origin: Australia
- Manufacturer: Jabiru Aircraft
- Status: In production (2012)
- Number built: 400 (2011)

History
- Developed from: Jabiru J160

The Jabiru J170 is an Australian ultralight and light-sport aircraft, designed and produced by Jabiru Aircraft. The aircraft is supplied as a kit for amateur construction or as a complete ready-to-fly-aircraft.

== Design and development ==
The J170 was derived from the Jabiru J160, by using the J160 fuselage and the wings from the Jabiru J430 plus a bigger elevator to give it a better rate of climb at higher density altitudes. It was designed to comply with the US light-sport aircraft rules at a gross weight of 600 kg (1,323 lb). The J170 features a strut-braced high-wing with winglets, a two-seats-in-side-by-side configuration enclosed cockpit, fixed tricycle landing gear and a single engine in tractor configuration.

The aircraft is made from composites. Its 9.66 m (31.7 ft) span wet wing has an area of 9.56 m^{2} (102.9 sq ft), a fuel capacity of 135 litres (30 imp gal; 36 US gal) and flaps. The standard engine available is the 85 hp (63 kW) Jabiru 2200 four-stroke powerplant.

The J170 complies with both the US light-sport rules and United Kingdom BCAR Section "S" requirements. In Canada it qualifies as an Advanced Ultralight at a gross weight of 560 kg (1,235 lb)

== Specifications (J170) ==
Data from Bayerl and Jabiru Aircraft

General characteristics

- Crew: one
- Capacity: one passenger
- Length: 5.775 m (18 ft 11 in)
- Wingspan: 9.66 m (31 ft 8 in)
- Height: 2.300 m (7 ft 7 in)
- Wing area: 9.56 m^{2} (102.9 sq ft)
- Aspect ratio: 9.8:1
- Empty weight: 320 kg (705 lb)
- Gross weight: 600 kg (1,323 lb)
- Fuel capacity: 135 litres (30 imp gal; 36 US gal)
- Powerplant: 1 × Jabiru 2200 four cylinder, air-cooled, four stroke aircraft engine, 63 kW (85 hp)
- Propellers: 2-bladed wood/composite, 1.52 m (5 ft 0 in) diameter

Performance

- Maximum speed: 240 km/h (150 mph, 130 kn)
- Cruise speed: 185 km/h (115 mph, 100 kn)
- Stall speed: 72 km/h (45 mph, 39 kn) full flaps
- Never exceed speed: 260 km/h (160 mph, 140 kn)
- Range: 1,910 km (1,190 mi, 1,030 nmi)
- Service ceiling: 4,600 m (15,000 ft)
- g limits: +4/-2
- Maximum glide ratio: 10:1
- Rate of climb: 2.5 m/s (500 ft/min)
- Wing loading: 62.8 kg/m^{2} (12.9 lb/sq ft)
