= Jabiru J230 =

Australian homebuilt aircraft

J230
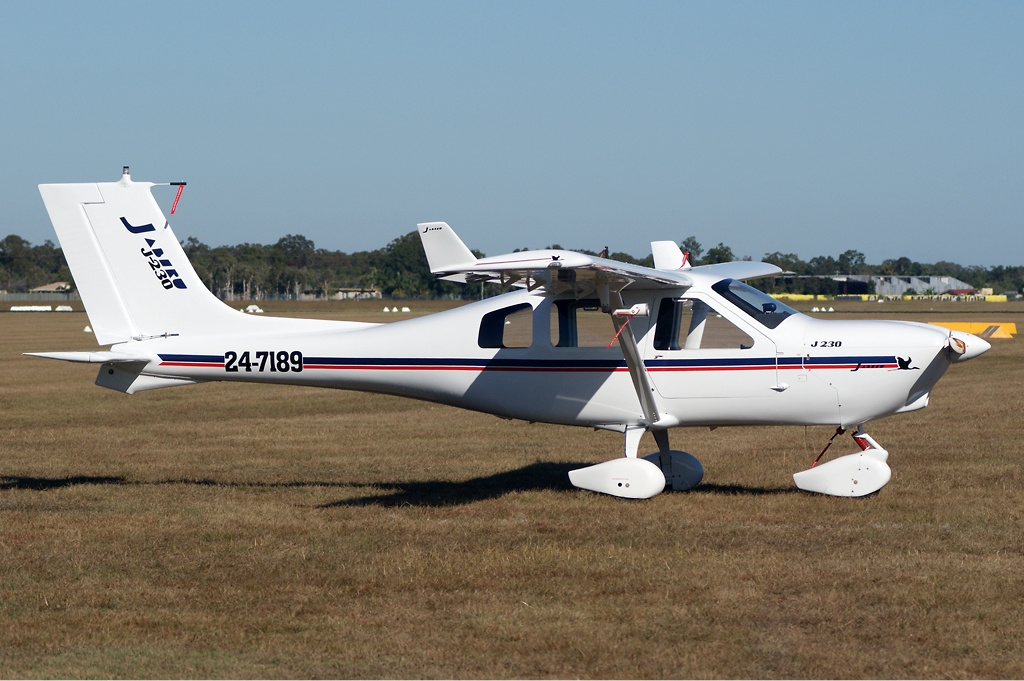

General information
- Type: Amateur-built aircraft and Light-sport aircraft
- National origin: Australia
- Manufacturer: Jabiru Aircraft
- Status: In production (2012)
- Number built: 100 (2011)

History
- Developed from: Jabiru J430

The Jabiru J230 is an Australian light-sport aircraft, designed and produced by Jabiru Aircraft. The aircraft is supplied as a kit for amateur construction or as a complete ready-to-fly aircraft.

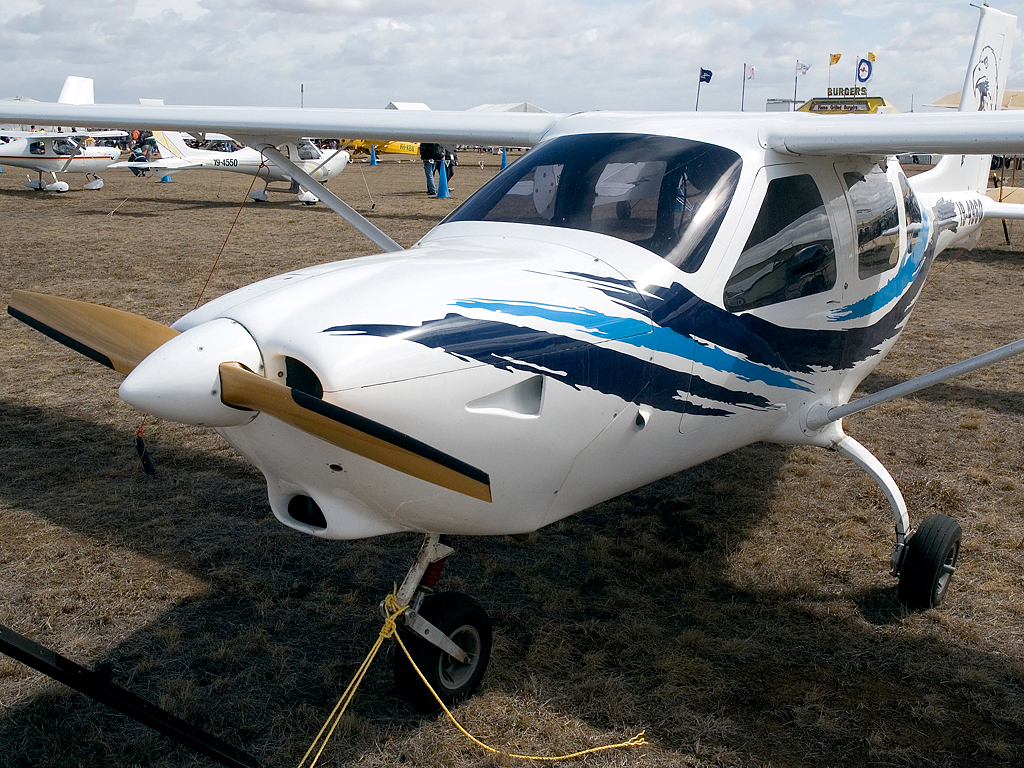
Jabiru J230

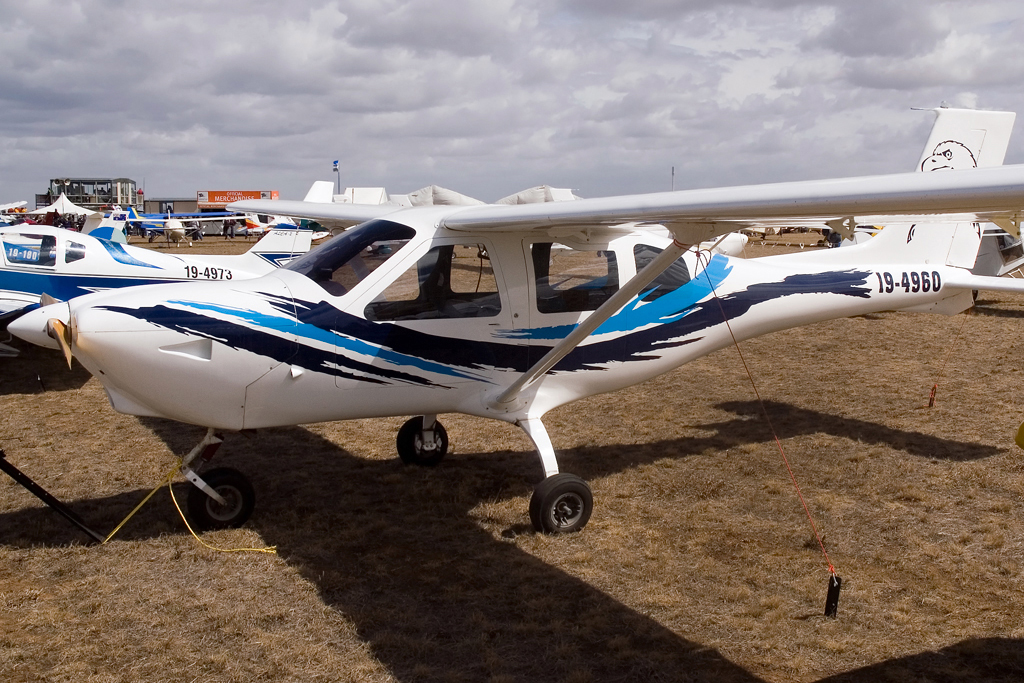
Jabiru J230

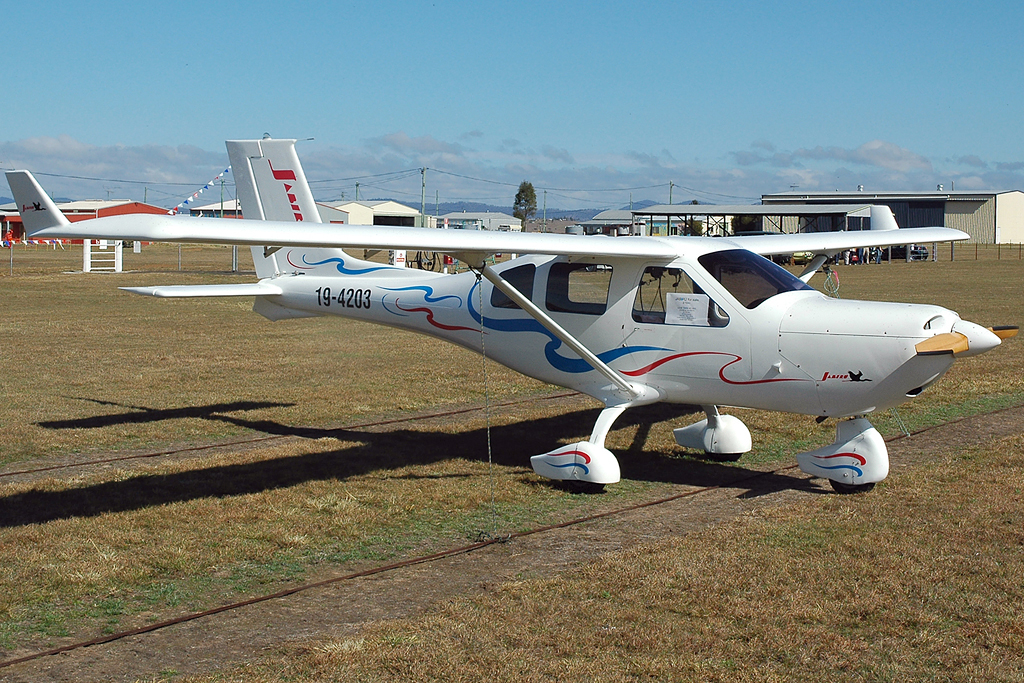
Jabiru J230

== Design and development ==
The J230 is a two-seat development of the four-seat Jabiru J430, optimized for the US light-sport category, which is restricted to two seats. The J230 uses the same wings and fuselage as the J430, but deletes the back seats, leaving a large baggage compartment. While the J430 has a gross weight of 1,540 lb (699 kg), the J230 is restricted to a gross weight of 1,320 lb (599 kg).

The J230 features a strut-braced high-wing, a two-seats-in-side-by-side configuration enclosed cockpit with a large rear baggage compartment, fixed tricycle landing gear and a single engine in tractor configuration. The cockpit is 44 in (112 cm) wide

The aircraft is made from composites. Its 31.3 ft (9.5 m) span wing has an area of 103 sq ft (9.6 m^{2}) and mounts flaps. The aircraft's recommended installed engine power 120 hp (89 kW) and the standard engine used is the 120 hp (89 kW) Jabiru 3300 four-stroke powerplant. Construction time from the supplied kit is estimated as 600 hours. The design is approved for night flying.

The J230 has a standard empty weight of 816 lb (370 kg), which combined with a full fuel capacity of 216 lb (98 kg) and a gross weight of 1,320 lb (599 kg) leaves 288 lb (131 kg) for crew, passenger and cargo with full fuel.

The J230 is listed on the Federal Aviation Administration's list of approved special light-sport aircraft.

== Operational history ==
By December 2011 one hundred examples had been registered and flown worldwide.

== Specifications (J230) ==
Data from Kitplanes and Jabiru Aircraft

General characteristics

- Crew: one
- Capacity: one passenger
- Length: 21 ft 6 in (6.55 m)
- Wingspan: 31 ft 4 in (9.55 m)
- Height: 7 ft 10 in (2.40 m)
- Wing area: 103 sq ft (9.6 m^{2})
- Aspect ratio: 9.7:1
- Empty weight: 816 lb (370 kg)
- Gross weight: 1,320 lb (599 kg)
- Fuel capacity: 36 U.S. gallons (140 L; 30 imp gal)
- Powerplant: 1 × Jabiru 3300 six cylinder, air-cooled, four stroke aircraft engine, 120 hp (89 kW)
- Propellers: 2-bladed wooden or composite fixed pitch

Performance

- Maximum speed: 138 mph (222 km/h, 120 kn)
- Stall speed: 52 mph (84 km/h, 45 kn)
- Never exceed speed: 160 mph (260 km/h, 140 kn)
- Range: 940 mi (1,510 km, 820 nmi)
- g limits: +4/-2
- Maximum glide ratio: 10:1
- Rate of climb: 1,300 ft/min (6.6 m/s)
- Wing loading: 12.8 lb/sq ft (62 kg/m^{2})
