= Jabiru J430 =

Australian light aircraft

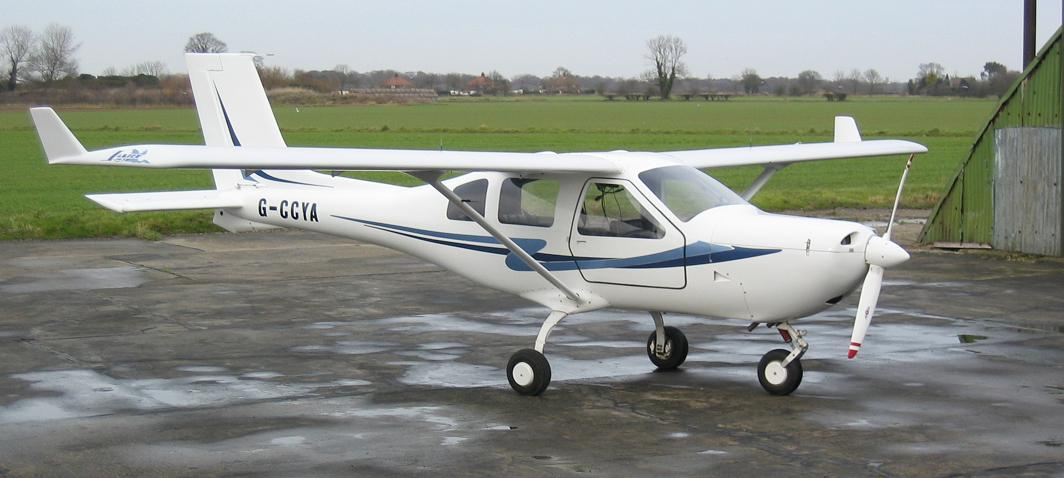

General information
- Type: Light Sport Aircraft Homebuilt
- National origin: Australia
- Manufacturer: Jabiru Aircraft

History
- Developed from: Jabiru J230

The Jabiru J430 is one model in a large family of two- and four-seat Australian light aircraft developed as a touring aircraft and provided in kit form by Jabiru Aircraft.

== Design and development ==
The J430 is constructed from composite materials. The 31.3 ft (9.5 m) span high wing is strut-braced and features winglets. The standard engine is the 120 hp (89 kW) Jabiru 3300 six-cylinder, horizontally opposed, four-stroke aircraft engine. The tricycle landing gear has optional wheel pants. The four-seat cabin features a width of 44 in (112 cm). Construction time from the factory-supplied kit is reported to be 600 hours. Twenty-five examples were completed and flying by the end of 2011.

== Variants ==
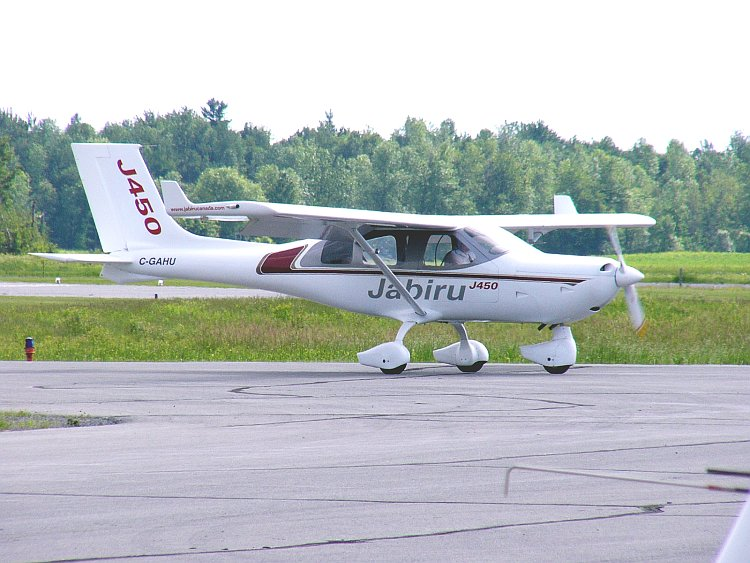
J450

data from Jabiru

Jabiru J200
Jabiru J230
A two-seat version of the J430, designed as a US light-sport aircraft, with a large baggage compartment behind the seats.
Jabiru J250
Model similar to the J450, with the back seat removed to give a large cargo area.
Jabiru J400
Four-seat version powered by a 120 hp (89 kW) Jabiru 3300 engine and marketed circa 2004.
Jabiru J430
A four-seater version of the J230 with two seats in the former baggage compartment.

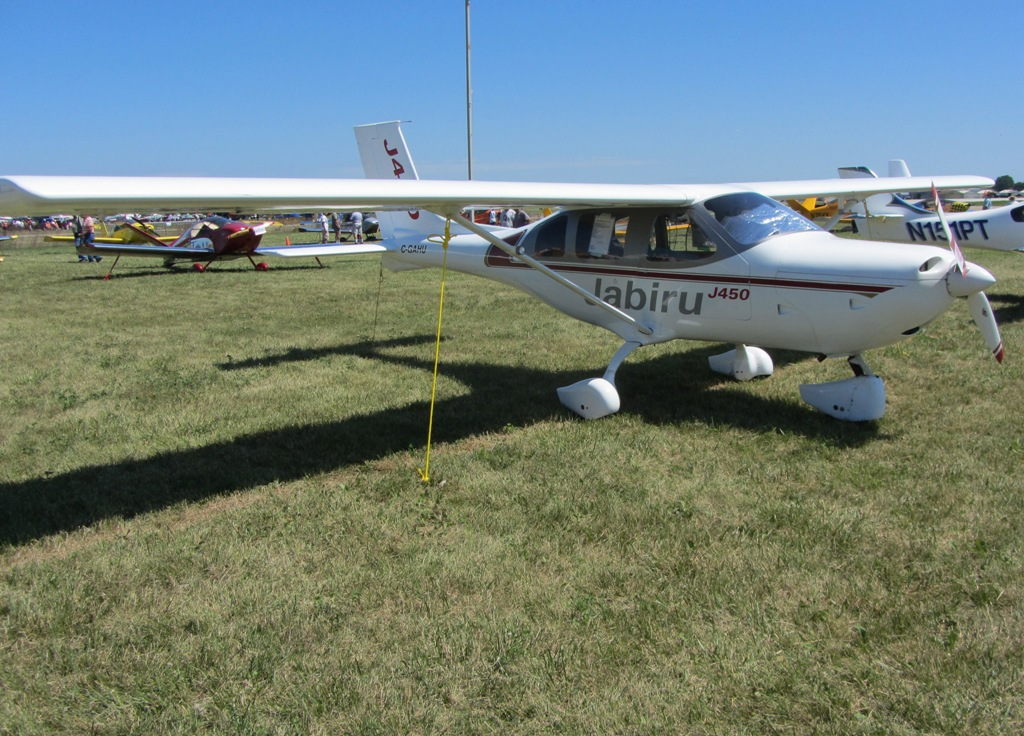
Jabiru J450

Jabiru J450
Four seat model.

== Specifications (J430) ==
Data from Jabiru Pacific

General characteristics

- Crew: one
- Capacity: 3 passengers
- Length: 6.55 m (21 ft 5.8 in)
- Wingspan: 9.433 m (30 ft 11 in)
- Height: 2.40 m (7 ft 10 in)
- Wing area: 9.34 m^{2} (100.5 sq ft)
- Empty weight: 340 kg (748 lb)
- Max takeoff weight: 760 kg (1,675 lb)
- Powerplant: 1 × Jabiru 3300 6 cylinder, 4 stroke piston engine, 89.5 kW (120 hp)
- Propellers: 1.52 m (5 ft 0 in) diameter 2-bladed Wooden/Composite

Performance

- Maximum speed: 256 km/h (160 mph, 140 kn)
- Cruise speed: 222 km/h (138 mph, 120 kn)
- Stall speed: 92 km/h (57 mph, 50 kn)
- Range: 1,480 km (920 mi, 800 nmi)
- Service ceiling: 4,600 m (15,000 ft)
- Rate of climb: 3.6 m/s (700 ft/min)
- Wing loading: 74.7 kg/m^{2} (15.3 lb/sq ft)
- Power/mass: 4.3 kg/kW (12.8 lb/hp )
- Flight Load Factor: + 3.8g - 1.9g
