= Recreational Aviation Australia =

Aviation association

- Founded: 1983
- Type: Not for profit
- Purpose: Aviation advocacy and aircraft registration
- Headquarters: Fyshwick, Australian Capital Territory, Australia
- Members: 9,400 (February 2017)
- Key people: Michael Monck (Chairman); Maxine Milera (CEO)
- Website: raaus.com.au
- Formerly called: The Australian Ultralight Federation

Recreational Aviation Australia (RAAus), formerly the Australian Ultralight Federation, is the governing body for ultralights in Australia.

RAAus registers ultralight aircraft and issues pilot certificates through 170 approved flight training facilities under a delegation from the nation's aviation regulator, the Civil Aviation Safety Authority.

== Mission ==
RAAus' stated mission is:

"Accessible, safe aviation for all by being an industry leader in developing sport and recreational aviation for the fun and enjoyment of our members"

== Membership ==
As of 24 September 2020 RAAus had just under 10,000 voting members and almost 3,500 aircraft registered.

== See also ==
- List of RA-Aus certified aircraft types
