= Ernő Wilczek =

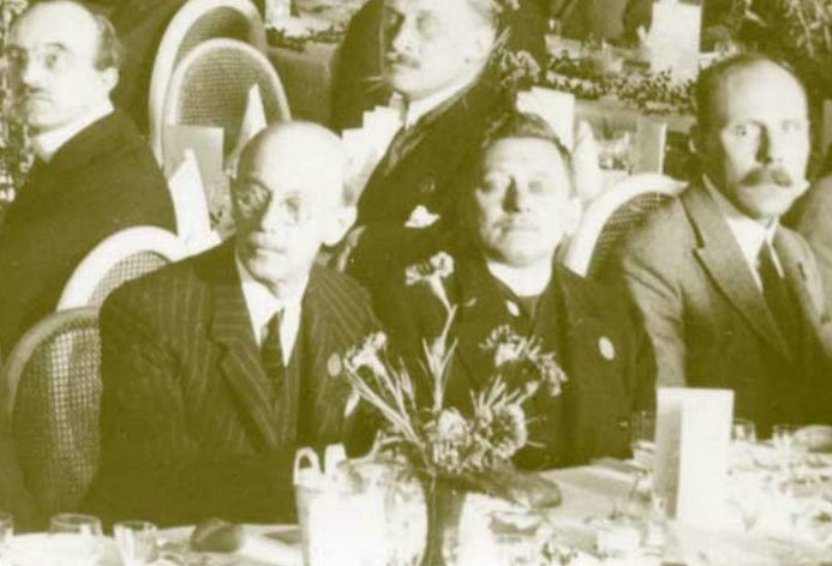
Kálmán Kandó, Ernő Wilczek and László Verebélÿ at the 1924 World Energy Conference

Ernő Wilczek (sometimes spelt Vilczek; 6 May 1883 in Kaposvár – 13 May 1950 in Budapest) was a Hungarian engineer. He graduated from the Budapest University of Art and Design in 1905 and then worked for several companies, in France and England, as a distributor of electric generators. From 1910 to 1933, he worked at the Ganz Works, first as a machine engineer, and later as the head of the engineering department. He was an associate of Titus Bláthy. In 1920, he won the Zipernowsky jubilee award for his scientific and technical activities. He specialized in standardization. From 1938 he was chairman of the Standards Committee and from 1949 he was deputy director of the Hungarian Standards Institute. He was editor of the journal Elektrotechnika from 1919 and later became editor-in-chief. His studies were published in domestic and foreign journals.

== Publications ==
- Data for the theory of DC turbine generators, Budapest, 1916
- Electricity Pocketbook, Budapest, 1936
- Second edition of the Electricity Manual by Mihály Gohér and András Lenkei, Budapest, 1943
