= MÁV Class V63 =

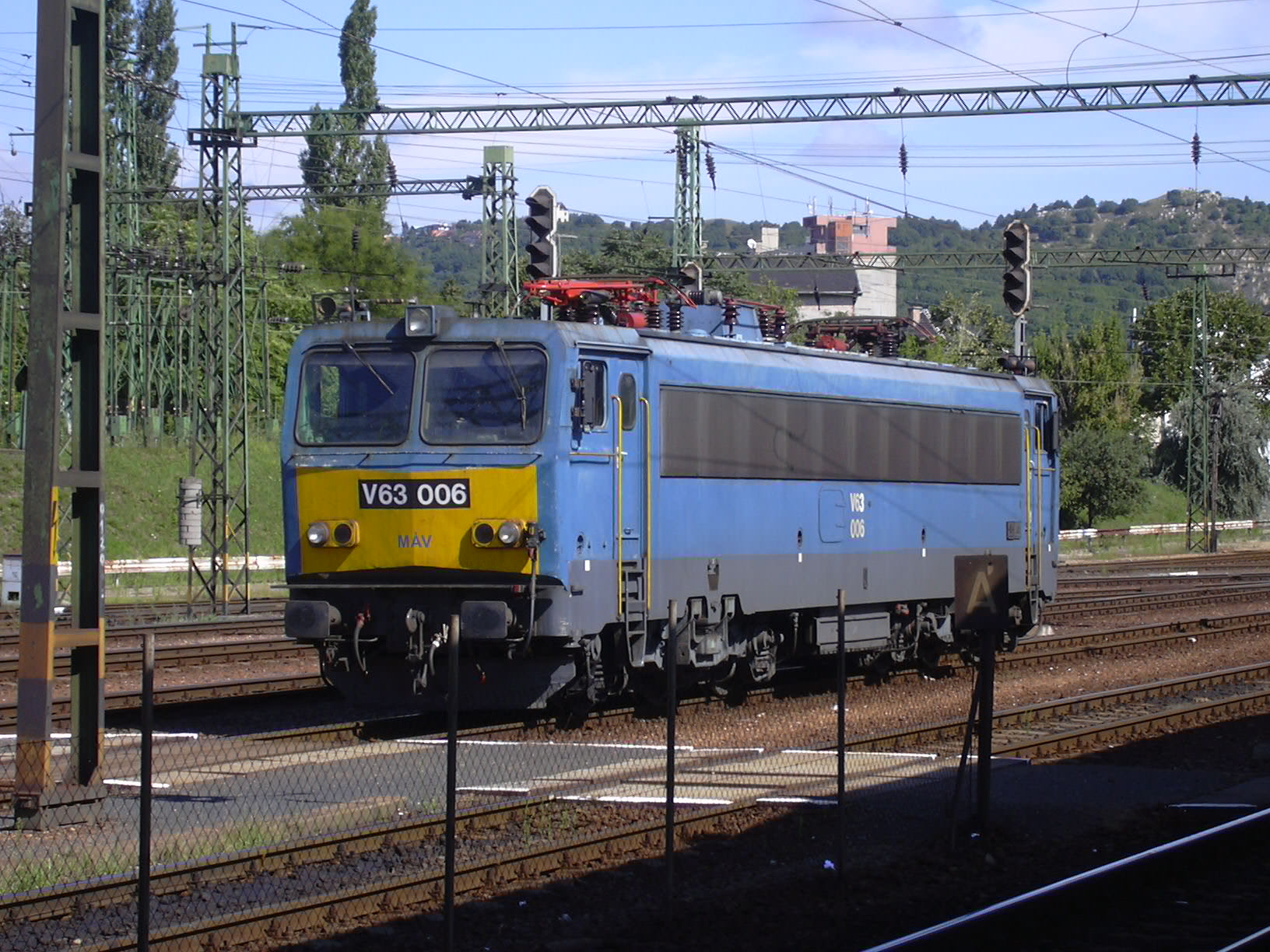
- MÁV Class V63
Type and origin
- Power type: Electric locomotive
- Builder: Ganz
- Build date: 1974–1988
- Total produced: 56
Specifications
- Configuration
  - UIC: Co′Co′
- Gauge: 1,435 mm (4 ft 8 1/2 in) standard gauge
- Wheel diameter: 1,250 mm (4 ft 1 in)
- Length
  - Over buffers: 19,596 mm (64 ft 3.5 in)
- Width: 3,040 mm (10 ft 0 in)
- Height: 4,420 mm (14 ft 6 in)
- Loco weight: 116 t (114 long tons; 128 short tons)
- Electric system/s: 25 kV 50 Hz AC
- Traction motors: 6 (DC)
- Transmission: Electric DC
- MU working: Yes
- Loco brake: Rheostatic braking, Disc brake
- Train brakes: Knorr brake
- Safety systems: EVM, ETCS
- Couplers: Buffers and chain coupler
Performance figures
- Maximum speed: 120 km/h (75 mph), 160 km/h (99 mph) (from number 138 to 156)
- Power output: • continued 3,600 kW (4,800 hp)
- Tractive effort
  - Starting: 450 kN (100,000 lb_{f})
  - Continuous: 248 kN (56,000 lb_{f})
Career
- Operators: MÁV

The MÁV Class V63 "Gigant" series (since 2011 H-START Class 630) were made by Ganz for MÁV to haul heavy freight and passenger trains with high tractive effort. This is the most powerful type of locomotive that have been made in Hungary.

== History ==
The first and second prototype units were delivered in 1975 (V63 001, V63 002). Both of these prototype units used electrical equipment from Western Europe while the later units used exclusively Hungarian made equipment. The null-series (V63 003, V63 004, V63 005, V63 006, V63 007) were delivered between 1980 and 1981. From 1984 the new units have been equipped with new bogies with better running performance licensed from Krupp. In total, 56 units have been delivered to MÁV. Of these, 51 units are still running.

In 1992 10 units got a modified transmission to be able to reach a speed of 160 km/h (99 mph).

In 2006, the V63 048, V63 138, V63 151 were equipped with ETCS, for testing purposes.
