= Miksa Déri =

Hungarian electrical engineer

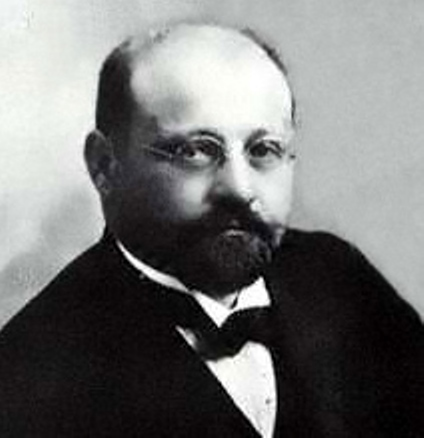
- Déri Miksa
- Born: Miksa Deri; 24 October 1854; Bács, Austrian Empire
- Died: 3 March 1938; Merano, Italy
- Education: Technical University of Budapest; Technical University of Vienna
- Engineering career
- Institutions: Ganz Works

Miksa Déri (27 October 1854 – 3 March 1938) was a Hungarian electrical engineer, inventor, power plant builder. He contributed with his partners Károly Zipernowsky and Ottó Bláthy in the development of the closed iron core transformer and the ZBD model.

Born in Bács, Miksa Déri obtained his diploma in hydraulic engineering in 1877 at the Technical University of Vienna. Between 1878 and 1882 he was engaged in designing of the Duna and Tisza river control systems, and studied electrotechnics. In 1882 he began working at the Ganz factory as an engineer. Later on he became the factory's director.

His other important invention was the constant voltage AC electrical generator in the Ganz Works in 1883. The missing link of a full Voltage sensitive - voltage intensive (VSVI) system was the reliable AC Constant Voltage generator. Therefore, the invention of the constant voltage generator at the Ganz Works played a crucial role in the beginnings of the industrial scale AC power generating, because only these types of generators can produce a stated output voltage, regardless of the value of the actual load.

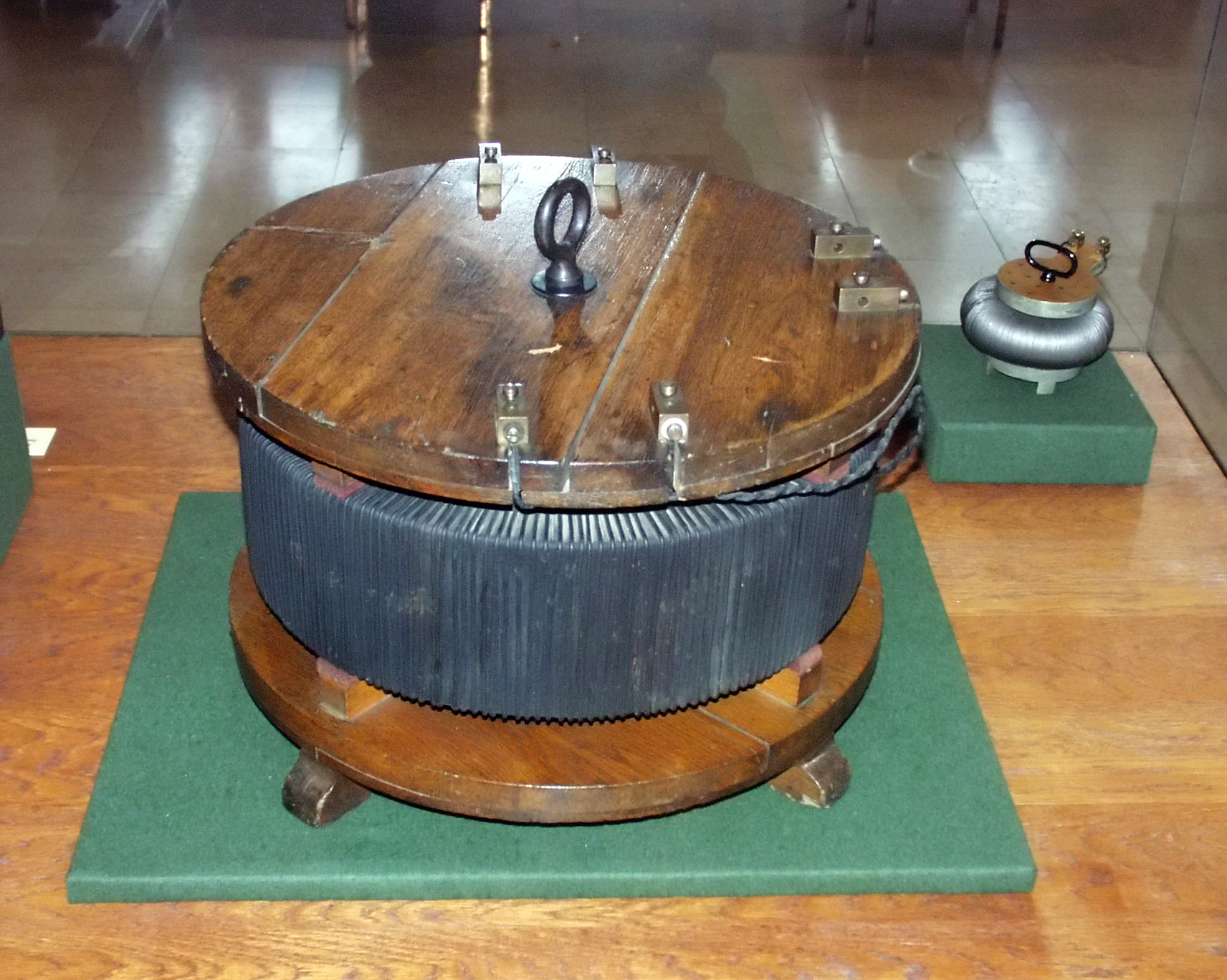
Prototypes of the world's first high-efficiency transformers. (Széchenyi István Memorial Exhibition Nagycenk)

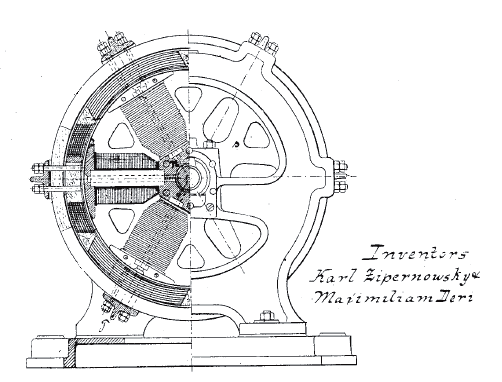
Dynamo Electric Machine [End View, Partly Section] (U.S. patent 284,110)

Magnetizing Current Shunt Circuit (U.S. patent 284,110)

Déri is also noted for inventing the single phase type of repulsion motor.

Déri died in Merano, Italy in 1938.

== Honors ==
- There is a secondary school named after Miksa Déri in Mátészalka Hungary.
- There is a secondary school named after Miksa Déri in Szeged Hungary that offers courses preparing students for the engineering fields.
