= Ganz Works =

Electrical manufacturer in Budapest, Hungary

Ganz Holdings Co. Ltd.
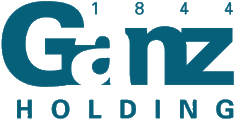

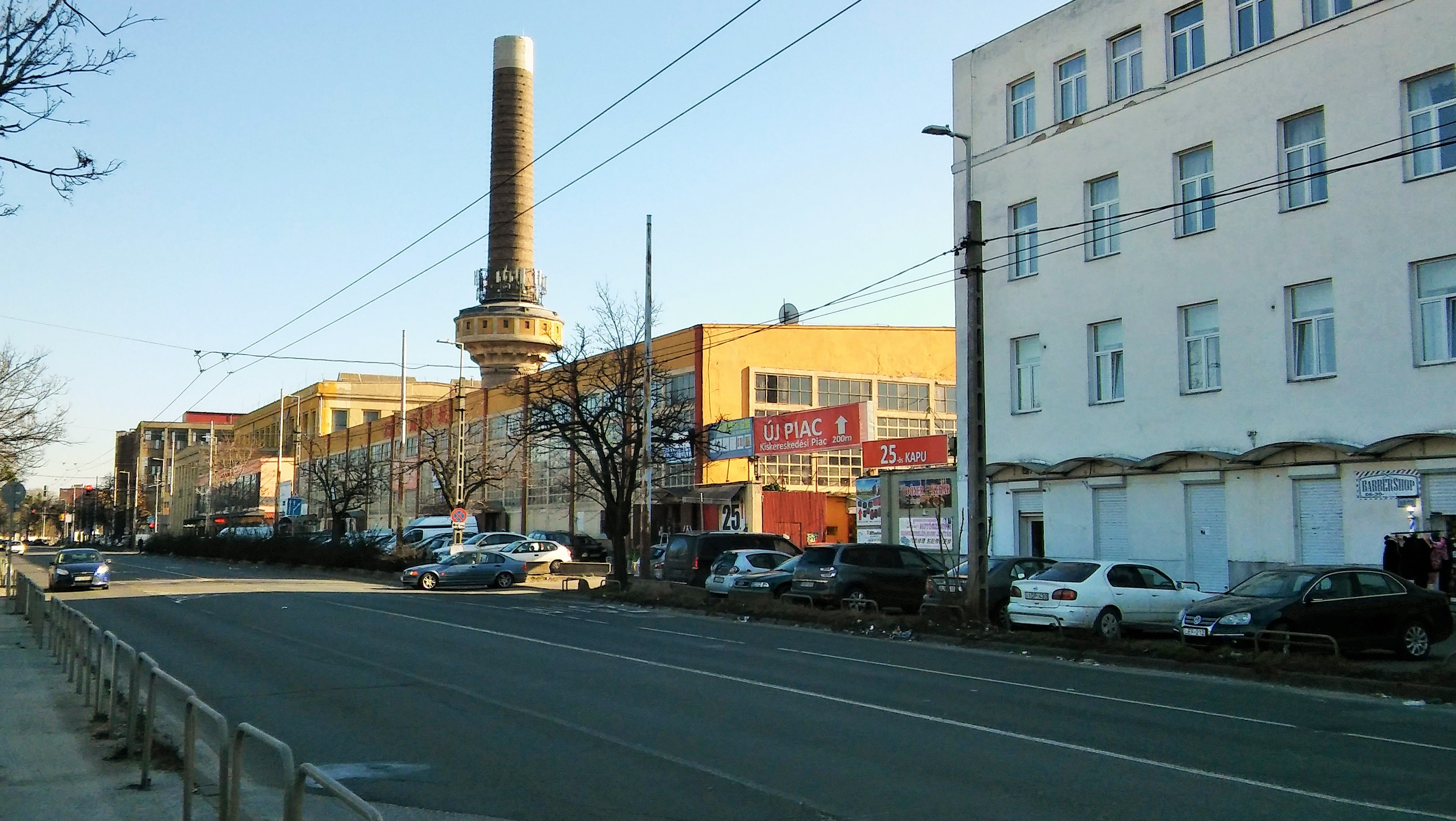
- The railway factory of the Ganz company (1880—1959: Ganz Wagon- and Machine Factory, 1959—1988: Ganz–MÁVAG Locomotive, Wagon- and Machine Factory) / Budapest, Kőbányai út 19-33. /
- Formerly: Ganz–Danubius (1911–59?); Ganz-MÁVAG (1959–89)
- Type: Private (1845–1947); State-owned (1947–59)
- Industry: Transport; Metallurgy
- Founded: 1844 in Buda, Kingdom of Hungary
- Founders: Ábrahám Ganz
- Defunct: 1989; 37 years ago
- Fate: Sold in 1989 to diverse companies that used the name 'Ganz'for their own enterprises
- Headquarters: Buda, Hungary
- Area served: Worldwide
- Key people: List: Károly Zipernowsky; Ottó Bláthy; Miksa Déri; András Mechwart; Kálmán Kandó; Donát Bánki; János Csonka; Zoltán Fitos
- Products: Trams; Trains; Ships; Electric generators
- Owner: Ábrahám Ganz and his family (1845–1947); State of Hungary (1947–1949)
- Subsidiaries: Ganz Danubius (ship yard); Ganz Acélszerkezet (bridge steel structures); Ganz Transelektro (power plant and electric power distribution equipment)
- Website: ganz-holding.hu

The Ganz Machinery Works Holding is a Hungarian holding company. Its products are related to rail transport, power generation, and water supply, among other industries.

The original Ganz Works or Ganz (Hungarian: Ganz vállalatok or Ganz Művek, Ganz companies, formerly Ganz and Partner Iron Mill and Machine Factory) operated between 1845 and 1949 in Budapest, Hungary. It was named after Ábrahám Ganz, the founder and manager of the company. Ganz is probably best known for the manufacture of tramcars, but was also a pioneer in the application of three-phase alternating current to electric railways.

Ganz also made ships (through its Ganz Danubius division), bridge steel structures (Ganz Acélszerkezet) and high-voltage equipment (Ganz Transelektro). In the early 20th century the company experienced its heyday and became the third-largest industrial enterprise in the Kingdom of Hungary after the Manfréd Weiss Steel and Metal Works and the MÁVAG company.

Since 1989, various parts of Ganz have been taken over by other companies.

== History ==
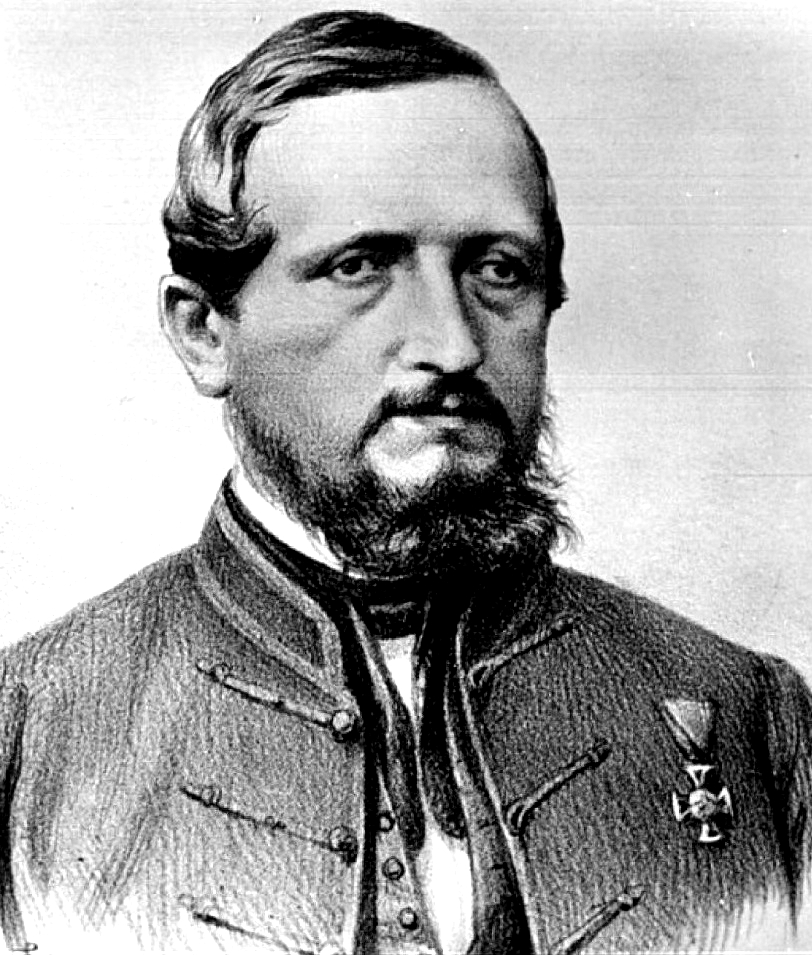
Abraham Ganz, founder

The company was founded by Ábrahám Ganz in 1844. He was invited to Pest, Hungary, by Count István Széchenyi and became the casting master at the Roller Mill Plant (referred to as Hengermalom in Hungarian). In 1854 he began manufacturing hard cast railroad wheels in his own plant founded in 1844. The management of the steam mill paid a share of the profit to Ganz. This enabled him to buy, in 1844, land and a house for 4500 Forints in Víziváros, Buda castle district. Abraham Ganz built his own foundry on this site and started to work there with seven assistants. They made mostly casting products for the needs of the people of the city. In 1845, he bought the neighbouring site and expanded his foundry with a cupola furnace. He gave his brother, Henrik a job as a clerk, because of the growing administration work. He made a profit in the first year, and his factory grew, even though he had not yet engaged in mass production. In 1846, at the third Hungarian Industrywork Exhibition (Magyar Iparmű Kiállítás), he introduced his stoves to the public. He won the silver medal of the exhibition committee and the bronze medaille from Archduke Joseph, Palatine of Hungary.

During the Hungarian Revolution of 1848 the foundry made ten cannons and many cannonballs for the Hungarian army. Because of this, the Military Court of Austria impeached him. He got seven weeks in prison as penalty, but because of his Swiss citizenship he was acquitted of the charge.

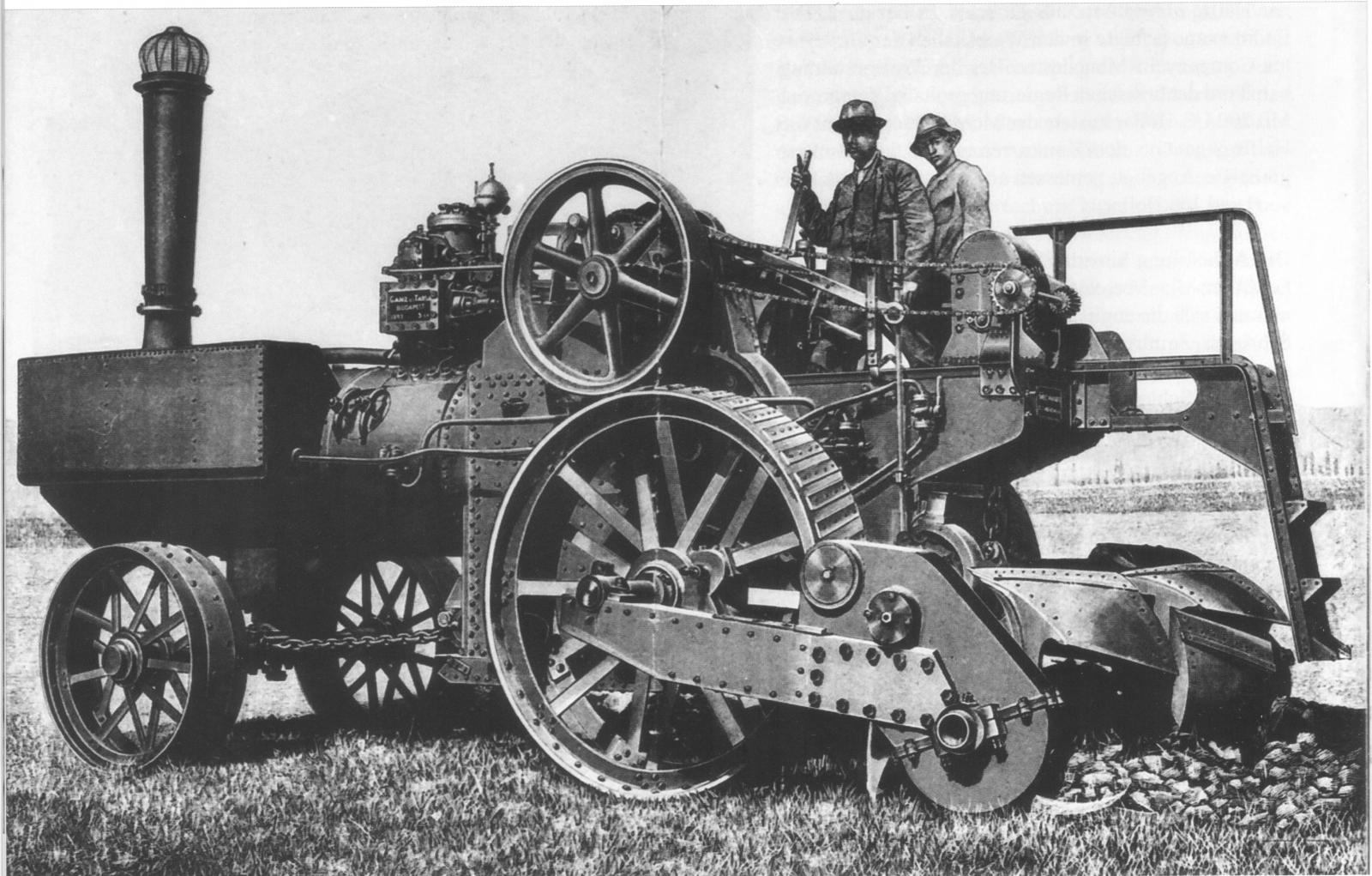
Ganz steam tractor with rotary plow, (produced since the 1870s)

Ganz recognized that, to develop his factory, he had to make products that were mass-produced. In 1846 the Pest-Vác railway line was built. At that time, European foundries made wrought iron rims for spoked wagon wheels by pouring the casts in shapes in sand, and leaving them to cool down. He successfully developed a railway wheel casting technology; it was the new method of "crust-casting" to produce cheap yet sturdy iron railway wheels, which greatly contributed to the rapid railway development in Central Europe. 86,074 pieces of hard cast wheels had been sold to 59 European railway companies until 1866. Consequently, this factory played an important role in building the infrastructure of the Hungarian Kingdom and the Austro-Hungarian Empire. At this time the agricultural machines, steam locomotives, pumps and the railway carriages were the main products. At the beginning of the 20th century, 60 to 80% of the factory's products were sold for export.

After the death of Abraham Ganz, the heirs entrusted the management of the factory to his direct colleagues at Ganz Művek: Antal Eichleter, Ulrik Keller and Andreas Mechwart, which then took the name Ganz & Co. The Ganz family sold the company, which consisted of five departments, and in April 1869 it was transformed into a joint-stock company, and continued its operations under the name of "Ganz és Társa vasontöde és Gépgyár Rt." (Ganz & Partners Iron Foundry and Machine Factory Co.) The technical director was András Mechwart, under whose direction Ganz became one of the most important groups of machine building companies in the Austro-Hungarian Monarchy after 1869.

At the end of the 19th century, the products of the Ganz and Partner Iron Mill and Machine Factory (hereinafter referred to as Ganz Works) promoted the expansion of alternating-current power transmissions.

=== Prominent engineers ===
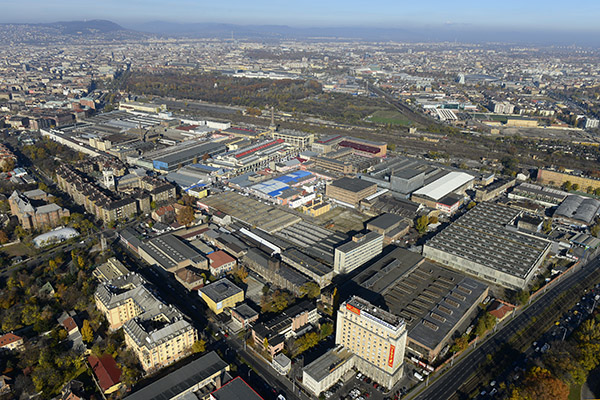
The Ganz wagon factory (aerial view)

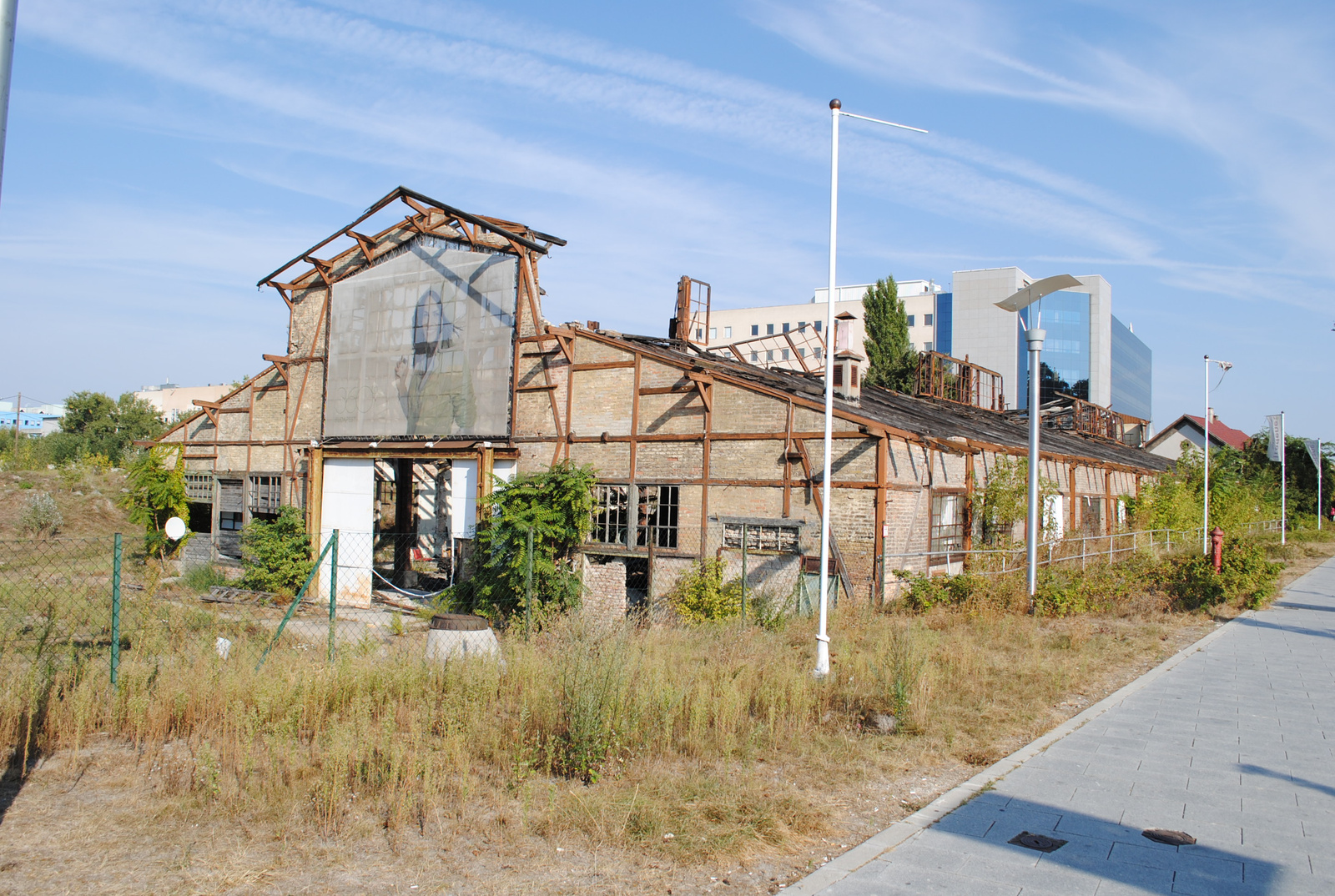
Ganz Shipyard hall building (The Shipyard was demolished in the early 2000s. This old, fachwerk-style hall was originally intended to be preserved, but it was also destroyed in 2015.) — Budapest, Meder utca

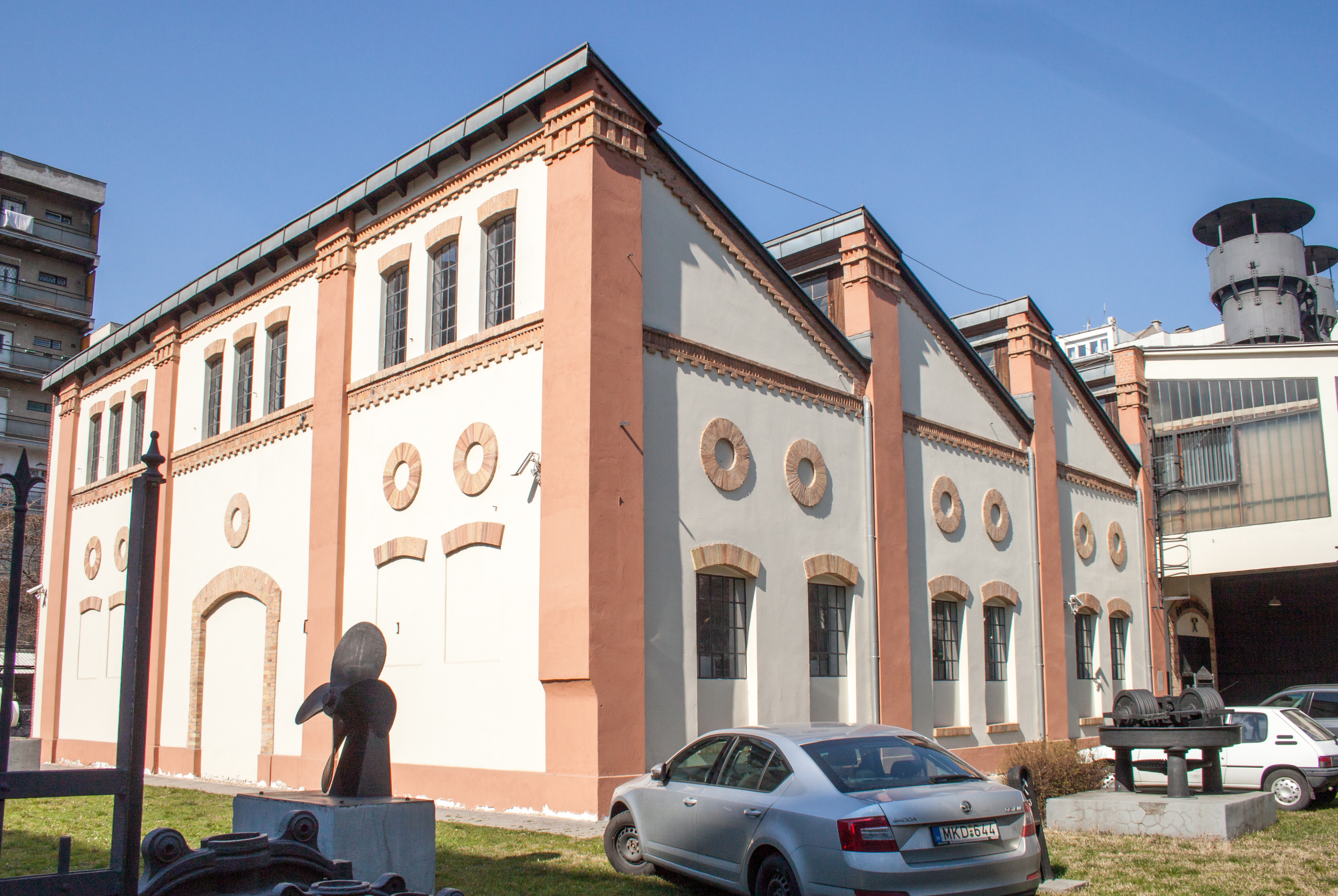
Ganz Trunk Factory Bark Foundry (now: Foundry Museum) — Budapest, Bem József u. 20.

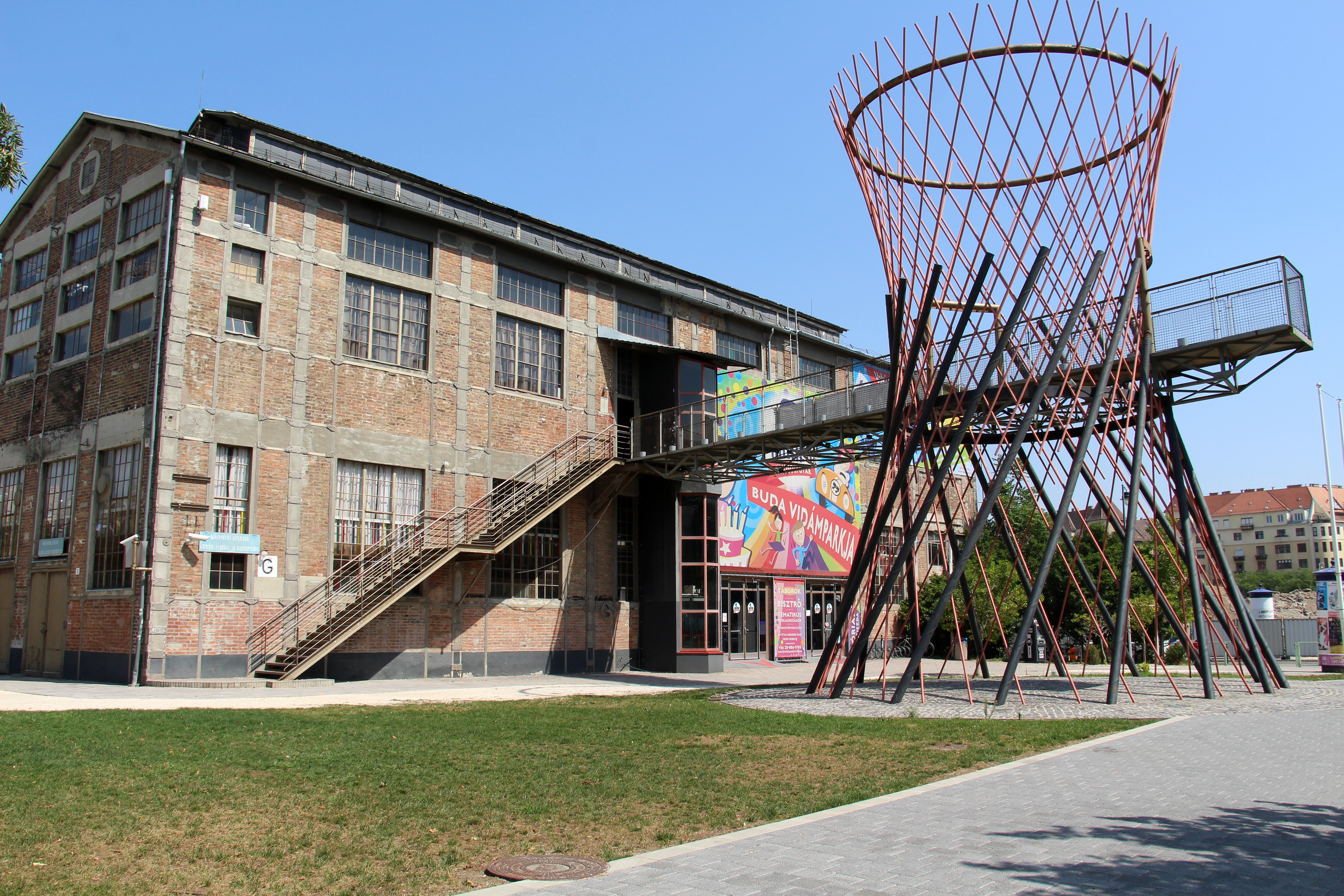
Ganz Electric Works (now: Millennium Park) — Budapest, Lövőház utca 39.

Prominent engineers at Ganz works included András Mechwart, Károly Zipernowsky, Miksa Déri, Ottó Titusz Bláthy, Kálmán Kandó, György Jendrassik and Ernő Wilczek.

=== Revolution in the milling industry ===
The invention of the modern industrial mill (the roller mill) – by András Mechwart in 1874 – guaranteed a solid technological superiority and revolutionized the world's milling industry. Budapest's milling industry grow the second largest in the world, behind the American Minneapolis. The Hungarian grain export increased by 66% within some years.

=== Power plants, generators turbines and transformers ===
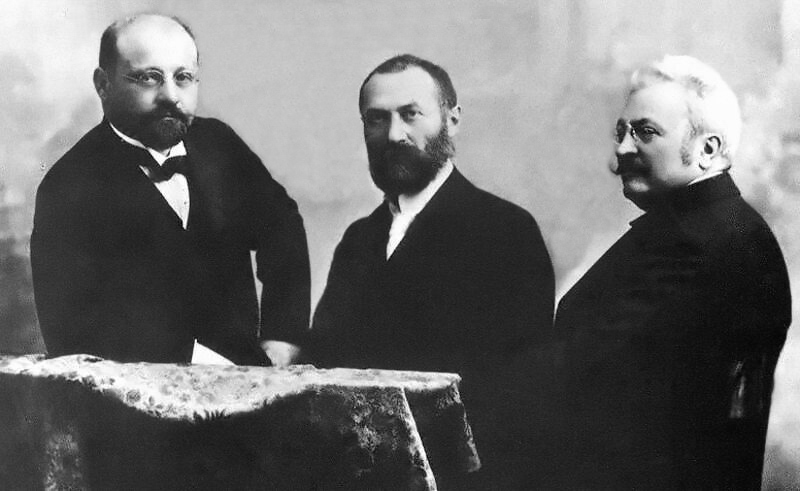
The Hungarian "ZBD" Team: Miksa Déri, Ottó Bláthy, Károly Zipernowsky

In 1878, the company's general manager András Mechwart founded the Department of Electrical Engineering headed by Károly Zipernowsky. Engineers Miksa Déri and Ottó Bláthy also worked at the department producing direct-current machines and arc lamps.

In 1878, the company began producing equipment for electric lighting and, by 1883, had installed over fifty systems in Austria-Hungary. Their AC systems used arc and incandescent lamps, generators, and other equipment.

==== Generators ====
The first turbo generators were water turbines which drove electric generators. The first Hungarian water turbine was designed by engineers of the Ganz Works in 1866. Mass production of dynamo generators started in 1883.

The missing link of a full Voltage Sensitive/Voltage Intensive (VSVI) system was the reliable alternating current constant voltage generator. Therefore, the invention of the constant voltage generator by the Ganz Works in 1883 had a crucial role in the beginnings of industrial scale AC power generation, because only these types of generators can produce a stable output voltage, regardless of the actual load.

==== Transformers ====
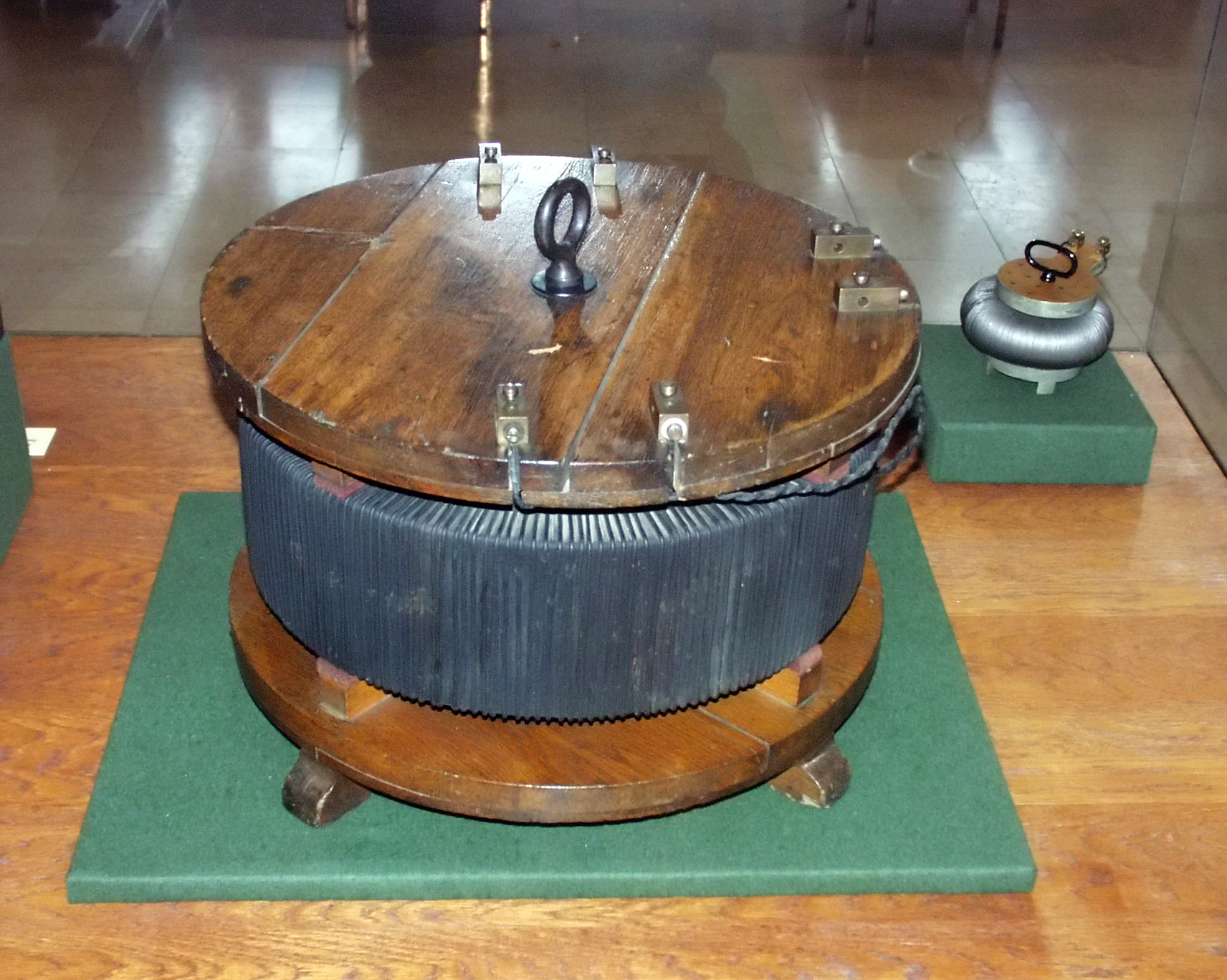
first high efficiency transformer prototypes (1885; Széchenyi István Memorial Exhibition, Nagycenk, Hungary)

In cooperation, Zipernovsky, Bláthy and Déri (known as the ZBD team) constructed and patented the transformer. The "transformer" was named by Ottó Titusz Bláthy. The three invented the first high efficiency, closed core shunt connection transformer. They also invented the modern power distribution system: Instead of a series of connections they connected supply transformers in parallel to the main line.

The transformer patents described two basic principles. Loads were to be connected in parallel, not in series as had been the general practice until 1885. Additionally, the inventors described the closed armature as an essential part of the transformer. Both factors assisted the stabilisation of voltage under varying load, and allowed definition of standard voltages for distribution and loads. The parallel connection and efficient closed core made construction of electrical distribution systems technically and economically feasible.

The Ganz Works built the first transformers using iron plating of enamelled mild iron wire, and started to use laminated cores to eliminate eddy currents

In May 1885, at the Hungarian National Exhibition in Budapest, Deri, Blathy, and Zipernowski held a large-scale demonstration of what is widely regarded as the prototype of modern AC lighting systems. Their system used 75 transformers in parallel connection, supplying 1,067 incandescent Edison lamps from an AC generator that provided 1,350 V.

==== AC Power stations ====
In 1886, the ZBD engineers designed, and the company supplied, electrical equipment for the world's first power station to use AC generators to power a parallel connected common electrical network. This was the Italian steam-powered Rome-Cerchi power plant.

Following the introduction of the transformer, the Ganz Works changed over to production of alternating-current equipment. For instance, Rome's electricity was supplied by hydroelectric plant and long-distance energy transfer.

Ganz Transelektro power plant and power distribution products

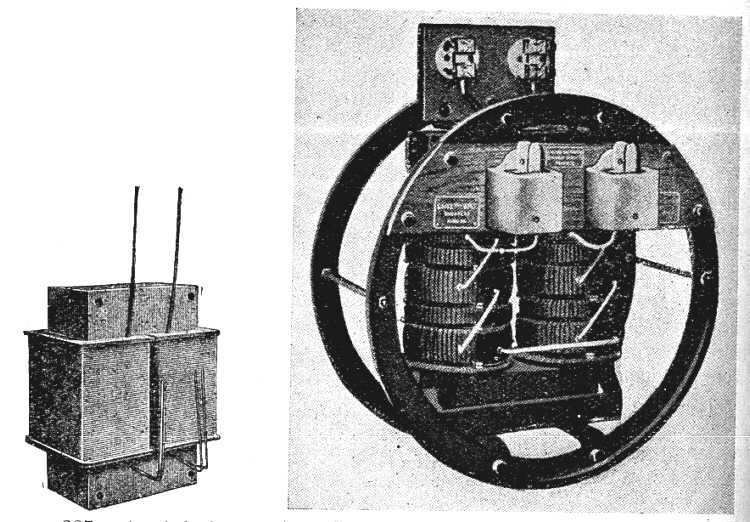
Ganz Transformers in december 1886

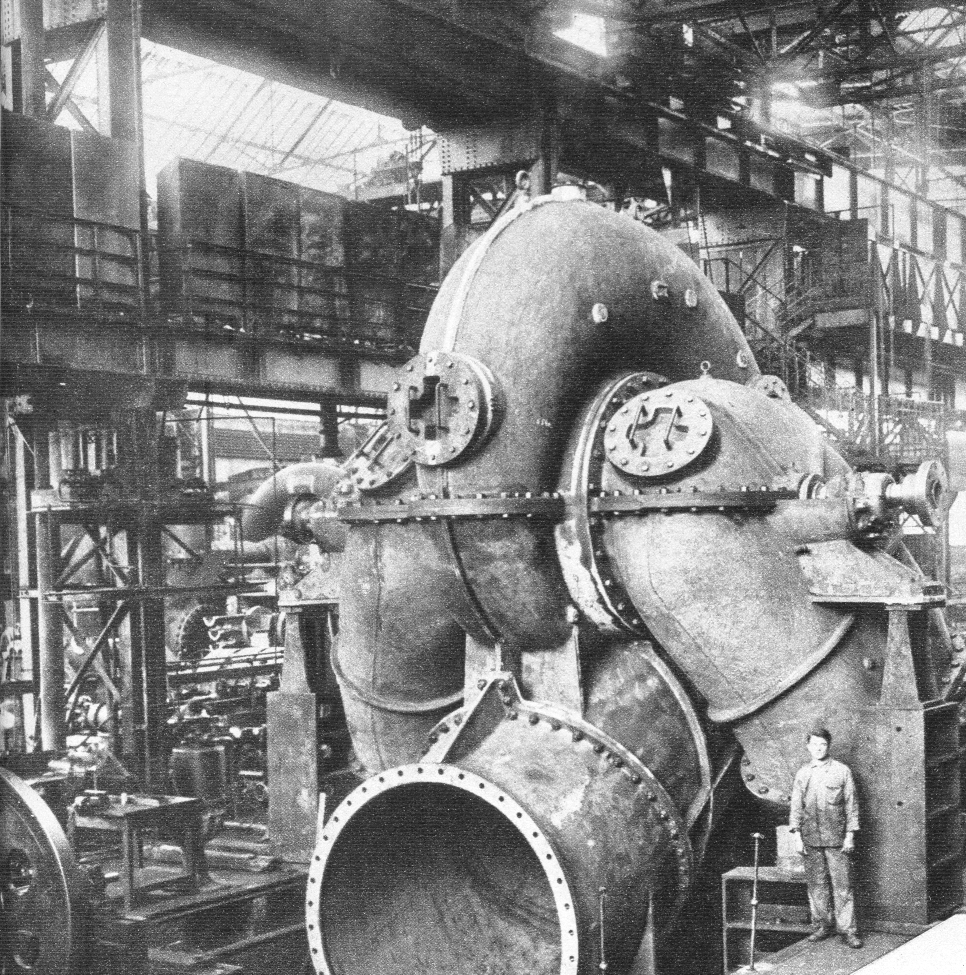
construction of a Ganz water turbo generator (1886)

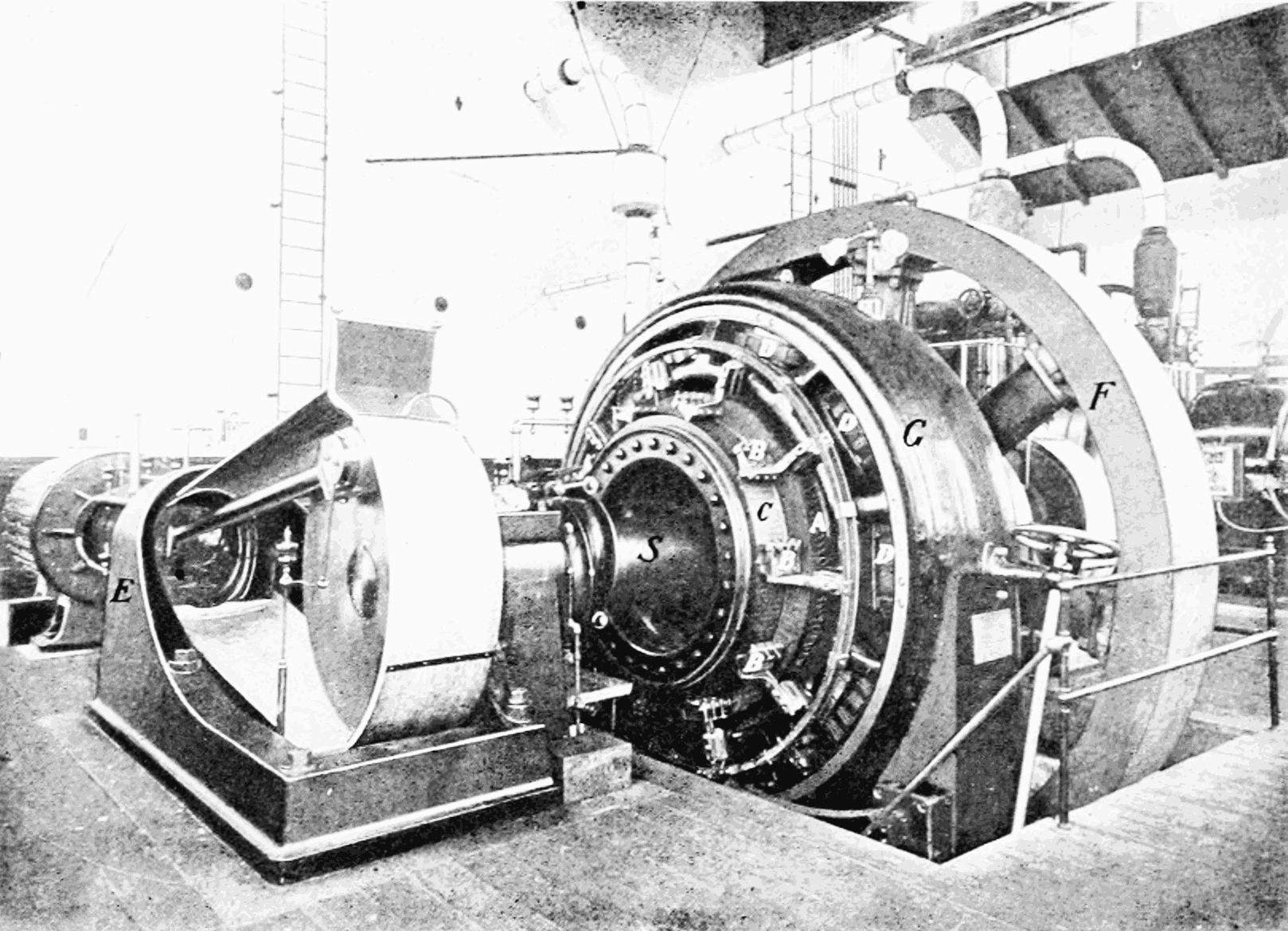
PSM V56 D0433 direct connected electric railway generator (1899)

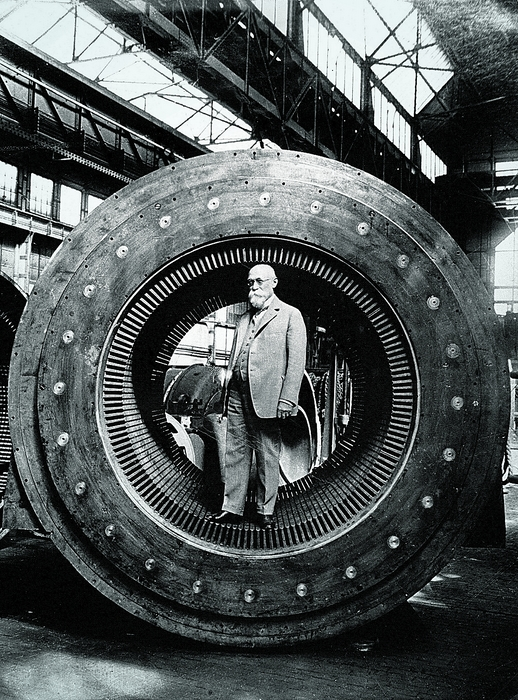
Ottó Bláthy in the armature of a turbo generator (1904)

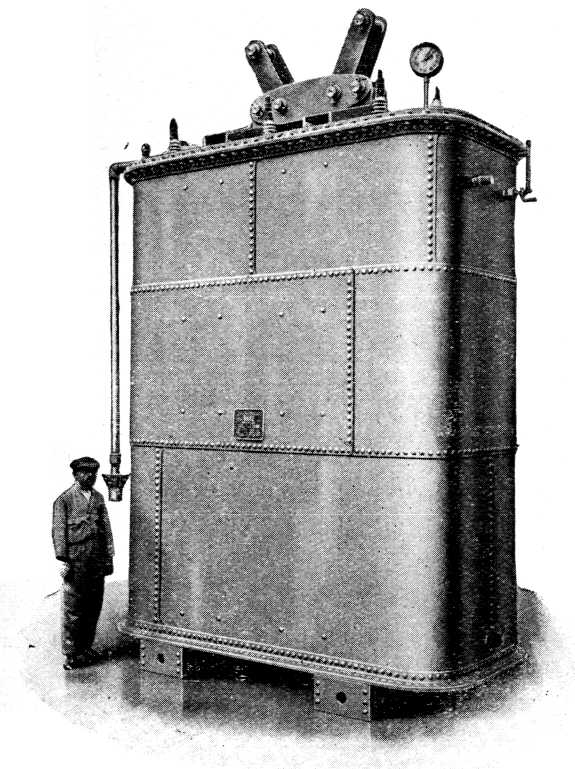
Ganz 21.000 kW Transformer (1911, weight: 38t)

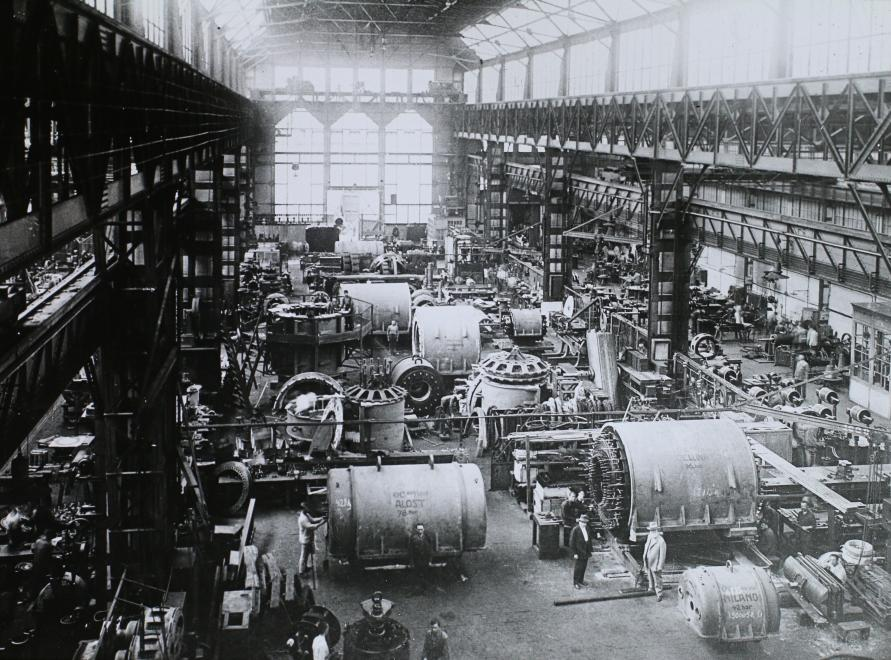
A generator assembly hall of the Ganz Works (1922)

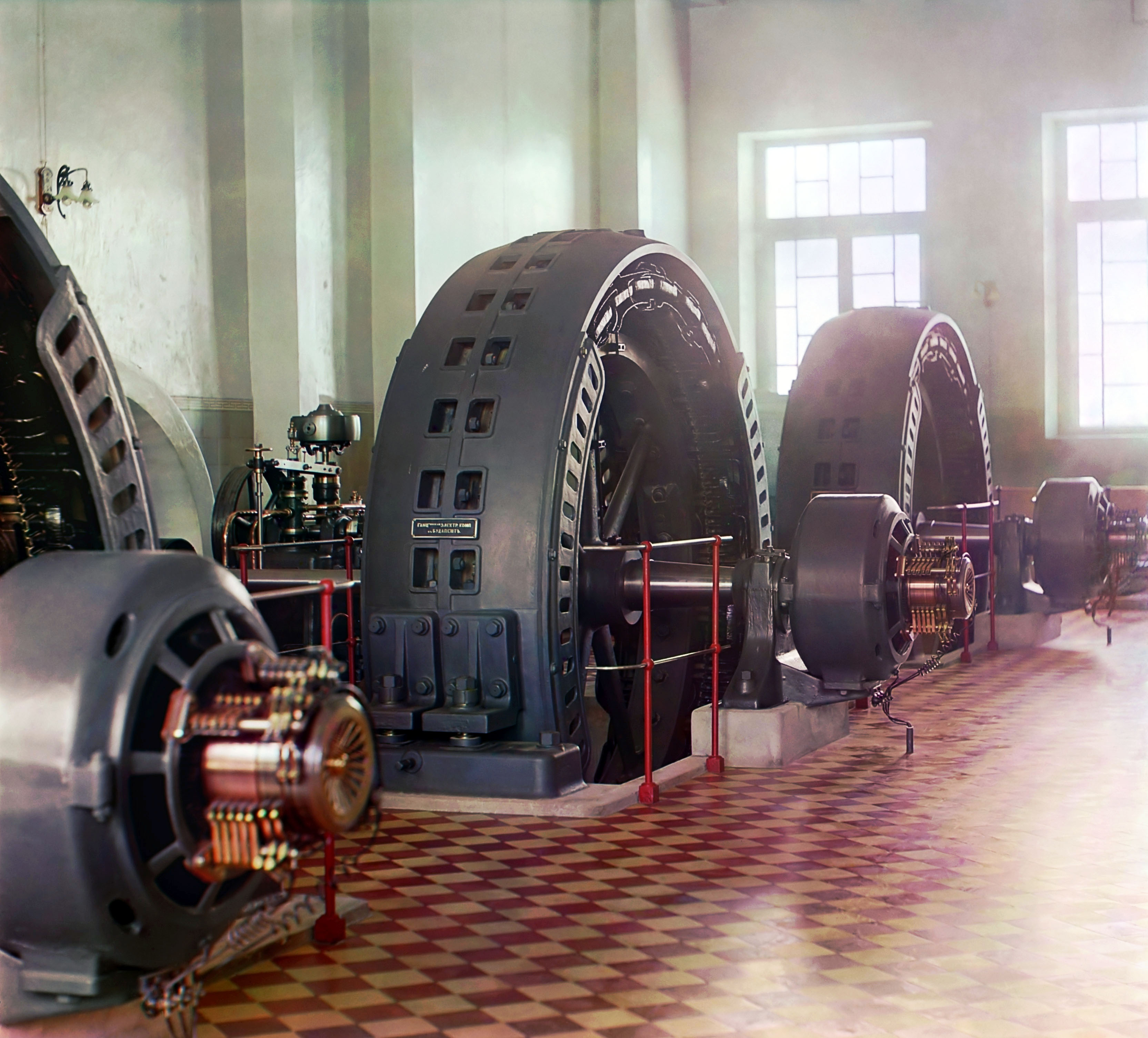
Alternators in a hydroelectric station on the Murghab River.

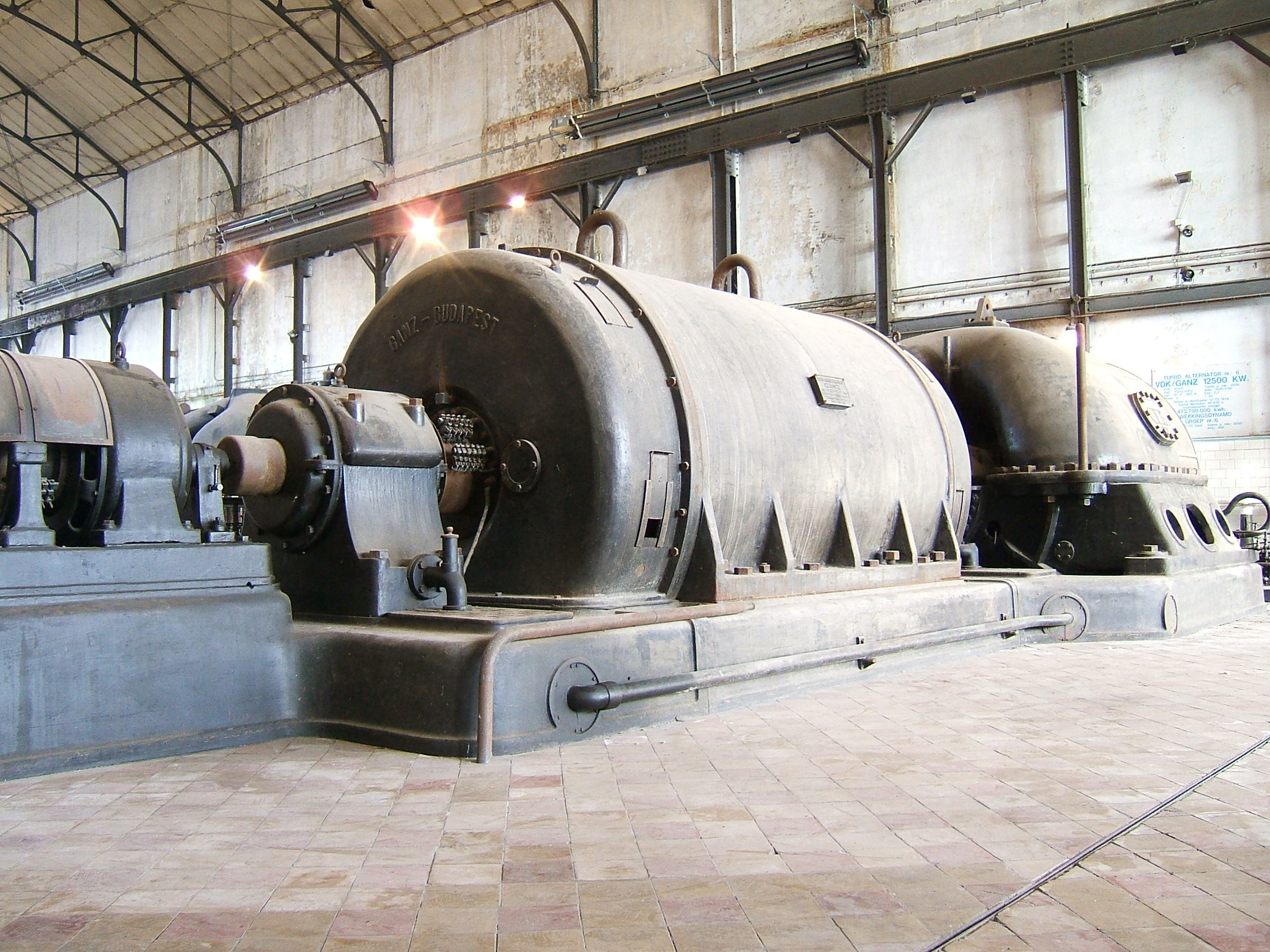
Generator in Zwevegem, West Flanders, Belgium

==== Electricity meters ====
The first mass-produced kilowatt-hour meter (electricity meter), based on Hungarian Ottó Bláthy's patent and named after him, was presented by the Ganz Works at the Frankfurt Fair in the autumn of 1889, and the company was marketing the first induction kilowatt-hour meter by the end of the year. These were the first alternating-current wattmeters, known by the name of Bláthy-meters.

==== Industrial refrigerators and air conditioners ====
In 1894, Hungarian inventor and industrialist István Röck started to manufacture a large industrial ammonia refrigerator (together with the Esslingen Machine Works) which was powered by Ganz electric compressors. At the 1896 Millennium Exhibition, Röck and the Esslingen Machine Works presented a 6-tonne capacity artificial ice producing plant. In 1906, the first large Hungarian cold store (with a capacity of 3,000 tonnes, the largest in Europe) opened in Tóth Kálmán Street, Budapest, the machine was manufactured by the Ganz Works. Until nationalisation after the Second World War, large-scale industrial refrigerator production in Hungary was in the hands of Röck and Ganz Works.

The contract between Ganz and Egypt in the 1930s played a key role in the development of cooling equipment: railcars delivered to Egypt were equipped with air-conditioning cooling systems. The collective of the Ganz factory (machine designers: Gábor Hollerung, Rezső Oláh, István Pfeifer, Prónai) designed and built the 3-cylinder, 20 kW compressors with freon refrigerant, air condenser and evaporator. The machine could also be converted to heat pump operation.

=== ICE engines and vehicles ===
The beginning of gas engine manufacturing in Hungary is linked to Donát Bánki and János Csonka but it is not clear that they ever worked for Ganz.

Ganz produced engines whose designs were licensed to Western European partners, notably in the United Kingdom and Italy.

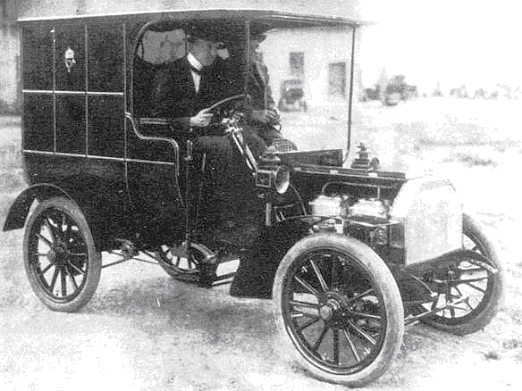
Csonka automobile of 1905

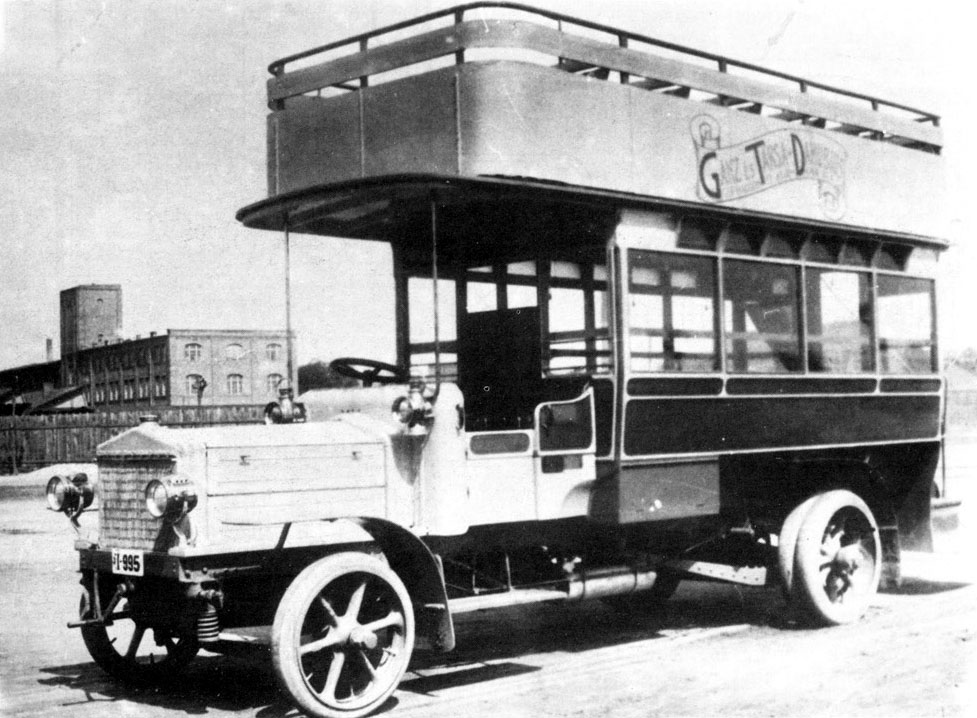
Ganz bus (1914; published in Vasárnapi Újság in 1916)

Timeline

- 1889 the first four-stroke gas engine was built by the Ganz factory
- 1893 the manufacture of paraffin and petrol fuelled engine with carburetor
- 1898 the manufacture of engines with the Bánki water injection system
- 1908 the introduction of a new petrol engine type, the series Am
- 1913 the manufacture of Büssing petrol engines for trucks
- 1914–18 the manufacture of fighter plane engines
- 1916 the manufacture of petrol engines, type Fiat
- 1920 the modification of petrol engines for suction gas operation
- 1924 György Jendrassik started his engine development activity
- 1928 the first railway diesel engine was completed, according to the plans of Ganz-Jendrassik
- 1929 the first export delivery of a railway engine using the system of Ganz-Jendrassik
- 1934 there was an engine reliability World Competition in the USSR where the Ganz engine achieved the best fuel consumption in its category
- 1939 Scale model of Ganz Ac Electric locomotive exhibited at the Italy Pavilion of the New York World's Fair
- 1939–42 construction of the Jendrassik Cs-1 turboprop engine
- 1944 the first application of the engine type XII JV 170/240 in a motor-train set
- 1953 modernisationon of the diesel engine system Ganz-Jendrassik
- 1959 the union of the Ganz factory and the MÁVAG company, establishing Ganz-MÁVAG

=== Railways ===
==== Steam motors ====
Cutaway Drawing of Millennium Underground in Budapest (1894–1896) which was the first underground in Continental Europe

The Ganz Company started to construct steam locomotives and steam railcars from the 1860s. Between 1901 and 1908, Ganz Works of Budapest and de Dion-Bouton of Paris collaborated to build a number of railcars for the Hungarian State Railways together with units with de Dion-Bouton boilers, Ganz steam motors and equipments, and Raba carriages built by the Raba Hungarian Wagon and Machine Factory in Győr. In 1908, the Borzsavölgyi Gazdasági Vasút (BGV), a narrow-gauge railway in Carpathian Ruthenia (today's Ukraine), purchased five railcars from Ganz and four railcars from the Hungarian Royal State Railway Machine Factory with de Dion-Bouton boilers. The Ganz company started to export steam motor railcars to the United Kingdom, Italy, Canada, Japan, Russia and Bulgaria.

===== The World's first electrified main railway line in Italy =====
The Ganz Works, having identified the significance of induction motors and synchronous motors, commissioned Kálmán Kandó to develop them. In 1894, Hungarian engineer Kálmán Kandó developed high-voltage three-phase AC motors and generators for electric locomotives. The first-ever electric rail vehicle manufactured by Ganz Works was a 6 HP pit locomotive with direct current traction system. The first Ganz made asynchronous rail vehicles (altogether 2 pieces) were supplied in 1898 to Évian-les-Bains (France) with a 37 HP asynchronous traction system. The Ganz Works won the tender for electrification of the Valtellina Railway in Italy in 1897. Under the management, and on the basis of plans from Kálmán Kandó, three phase electric power at 3 kV and 15 Hz was fed through two upper wires and the rails.

Former logo of the Ganz Works

The electricity was produced in a dedicated power station and the system operated for thirty years from 1902. Italian railways were the first in the world to introduce electric traction for the entire length of a main line rather than just a short stretch. The 106 km Valtellina line was opened on 4 September 1902, designed by Kandó and a team from the Ganz works. The voltage was significantly higher than used earlier and it required new designs for electric motors and switching devices. The three-phase two-wire system was used on several railways in Northern Italy and became known as "the Italian system". Kandó was invited in 1905 to undertake the management of Società Italiana Westinghouse and led the development of several Italian electric locomotives.

===== Invention of the Phase Converter =====
In 1918, Kandó invented and developed the rotary phase converter, enabling electric locomotives to use three-phase motors whilst supplied via a single overhead wire, carrying the simple industrial frequency (50 Hz) single phase AC of the high-voltage national networks. After World War I, at the Ganz Works, Kálmán Kandó constructed a single-phase electric railway system using 16 kV at 50 Hz. A similar system, but using 15 kV at 16.7 Hz, later became widely used in Europe. The main attribute of Kandó's 50 Hz system was that it was fed by the normal power network, so dedicated railway power stations became unnecessary. Because of the early death of Kálmán Kandó, László Verebélÿ continued the work for the Hungarian State Railways (MÁV).

Ganz Rail rolling stock

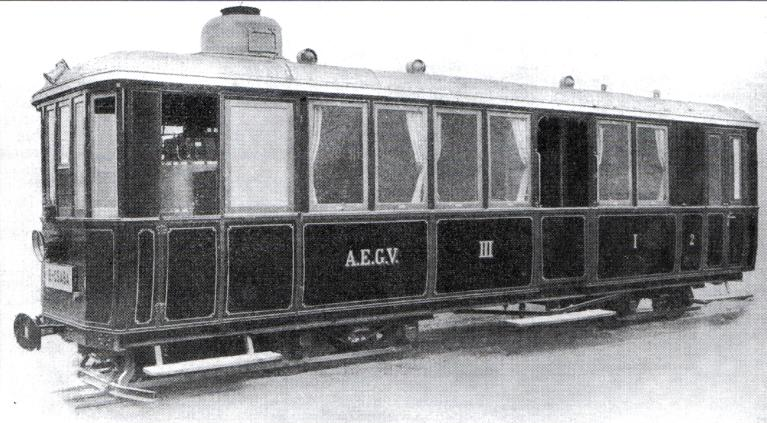
The first steam railcar built by Ganz and de Dion-Bouton

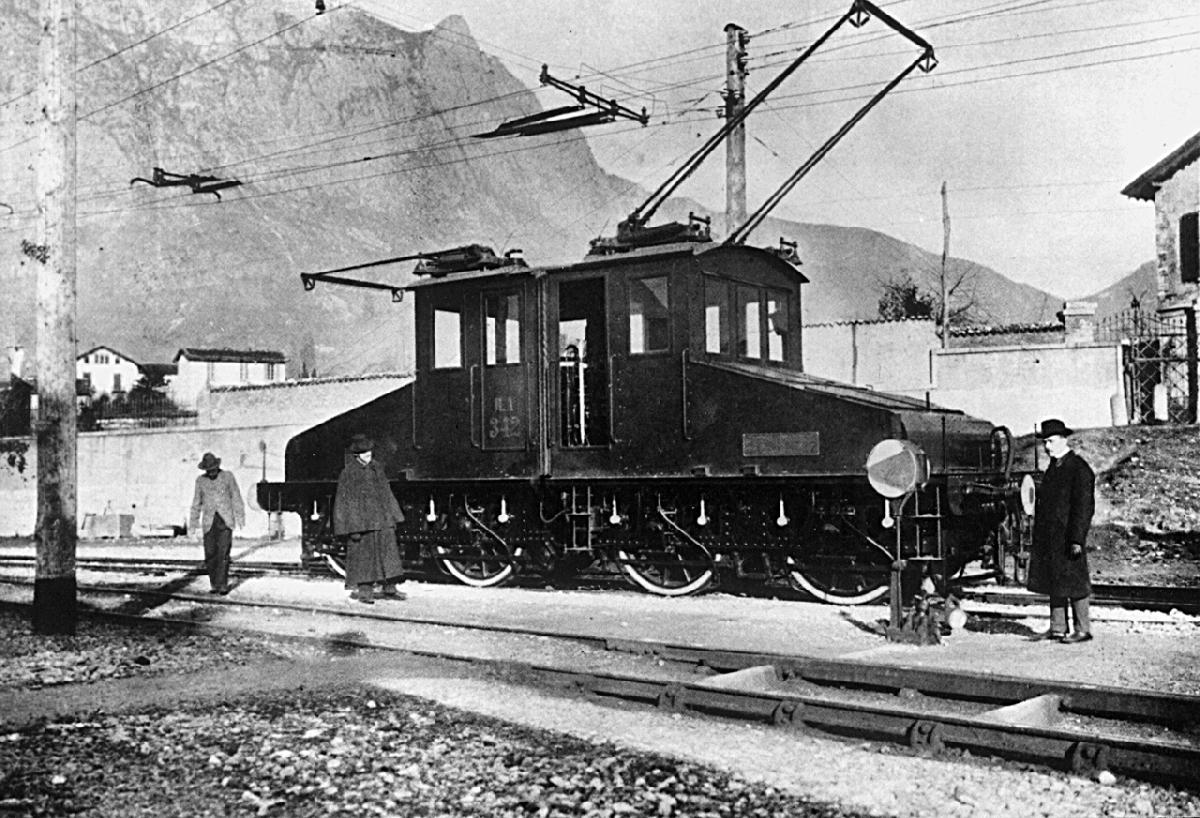
Ganz AC electric locomotive prototype (1901 Valtellina, Italy)

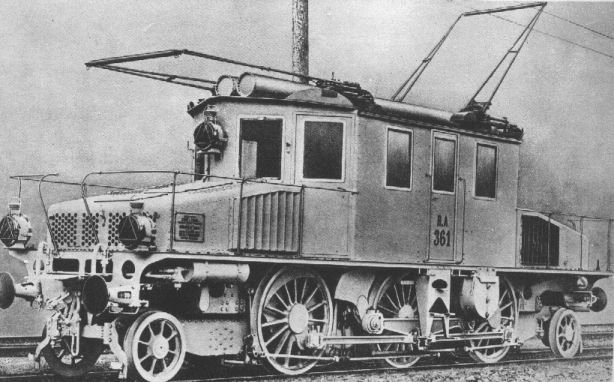
Electric locomotive RA 361 (later FS Class E.360) by Ganz for the Valtellina line, 1904

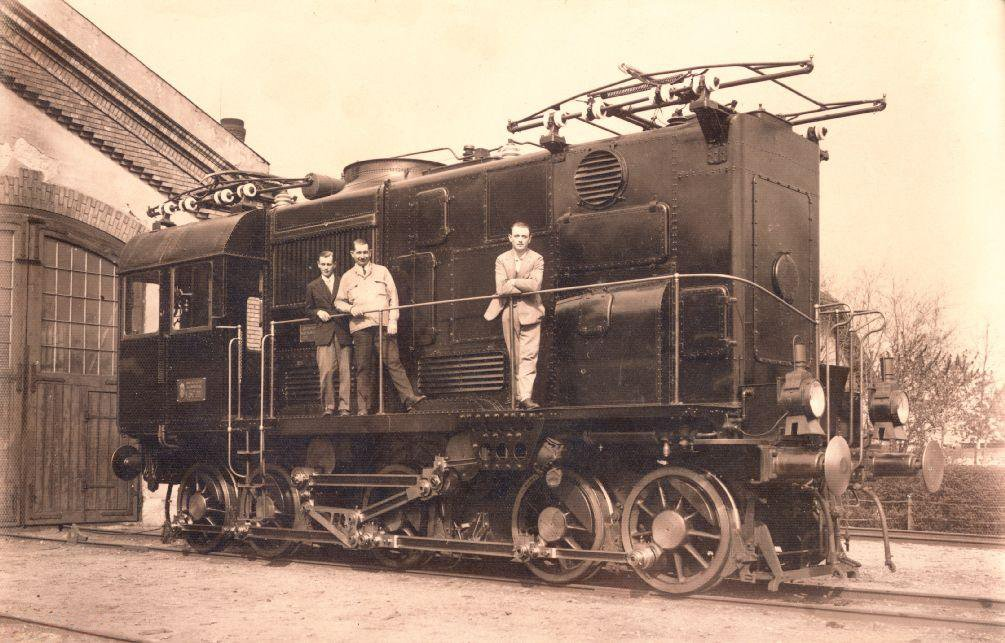
The first locomotive with a phase converter was Kando's V50 locomotive (only for demonstration and testing purposes)

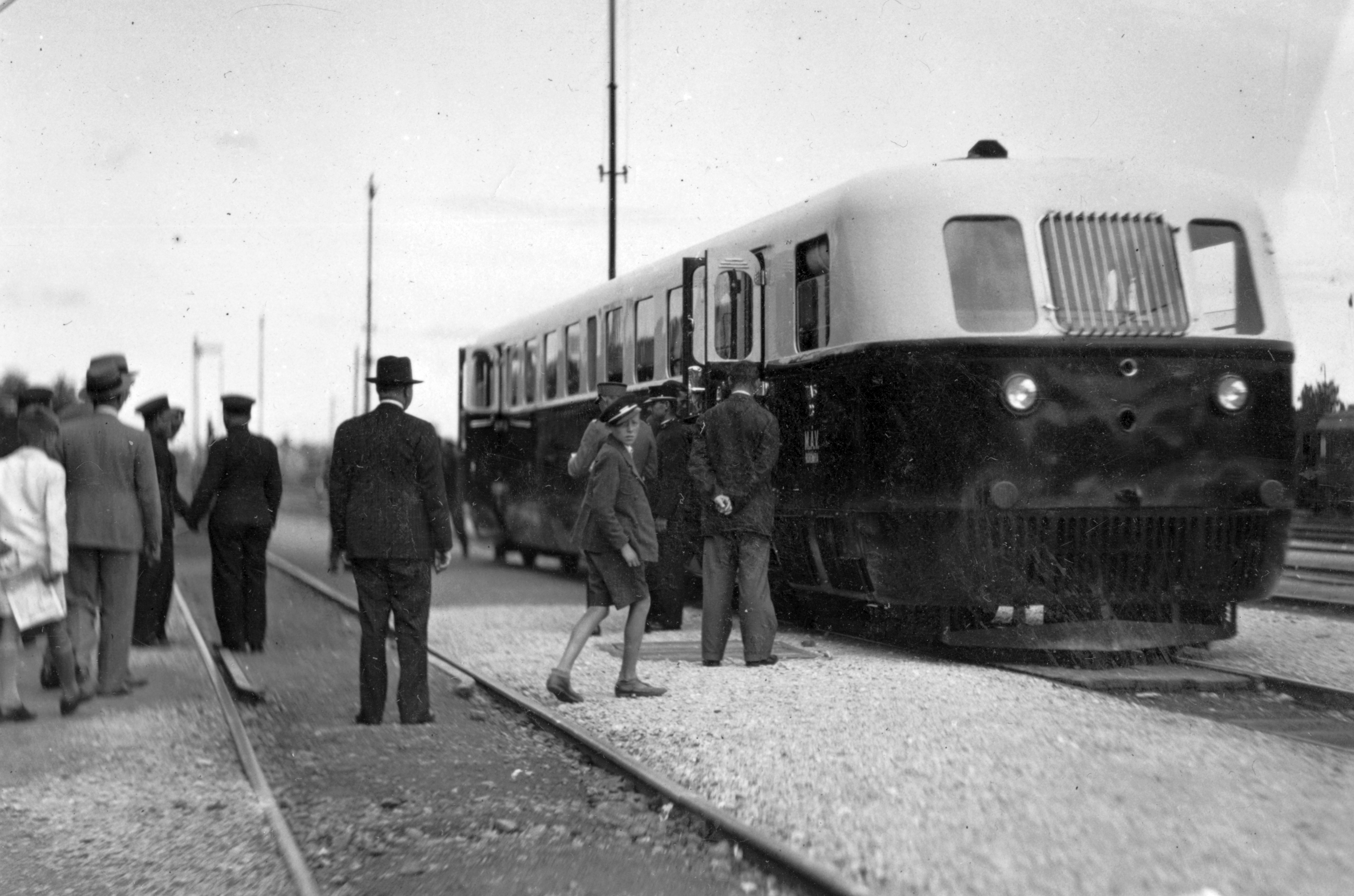
Árpád Diesel railbus in 1937

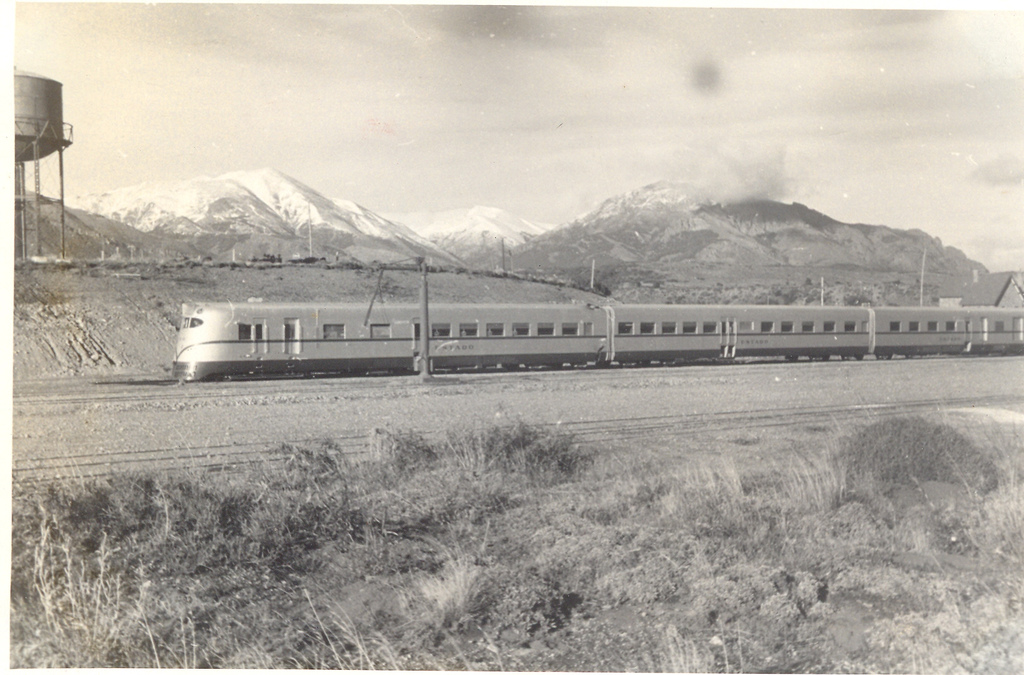
Ganz train on the Ferrocarriles Patagónicos railway in Argentina (1945)

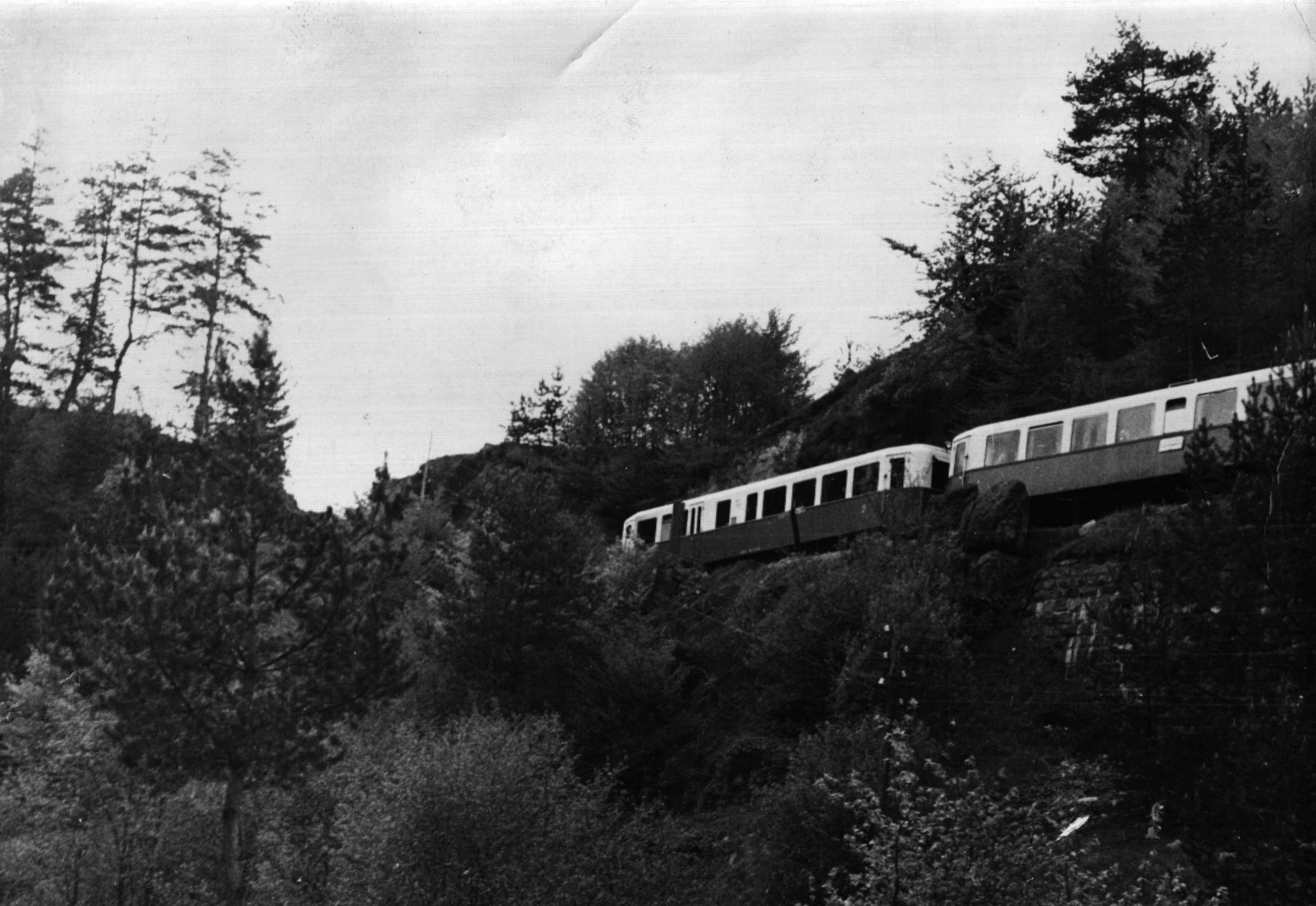
Ganz diesel railcar on Septemvri-Dobrinishte narrow gauge line, Bulgaria, 1950-1963

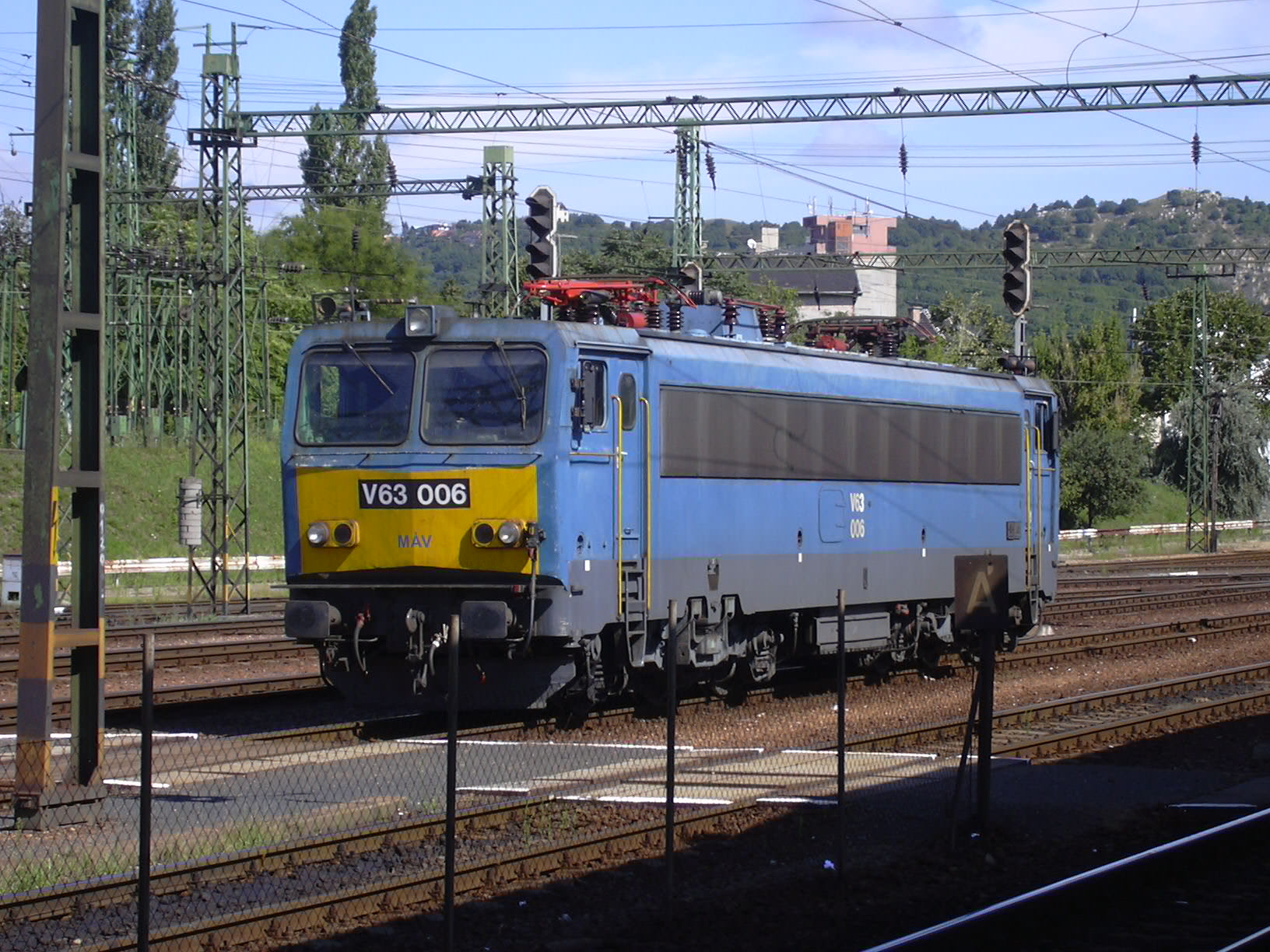
A series V63 Ganz-MÁVAG electric locomotive of Hungarian State Railways

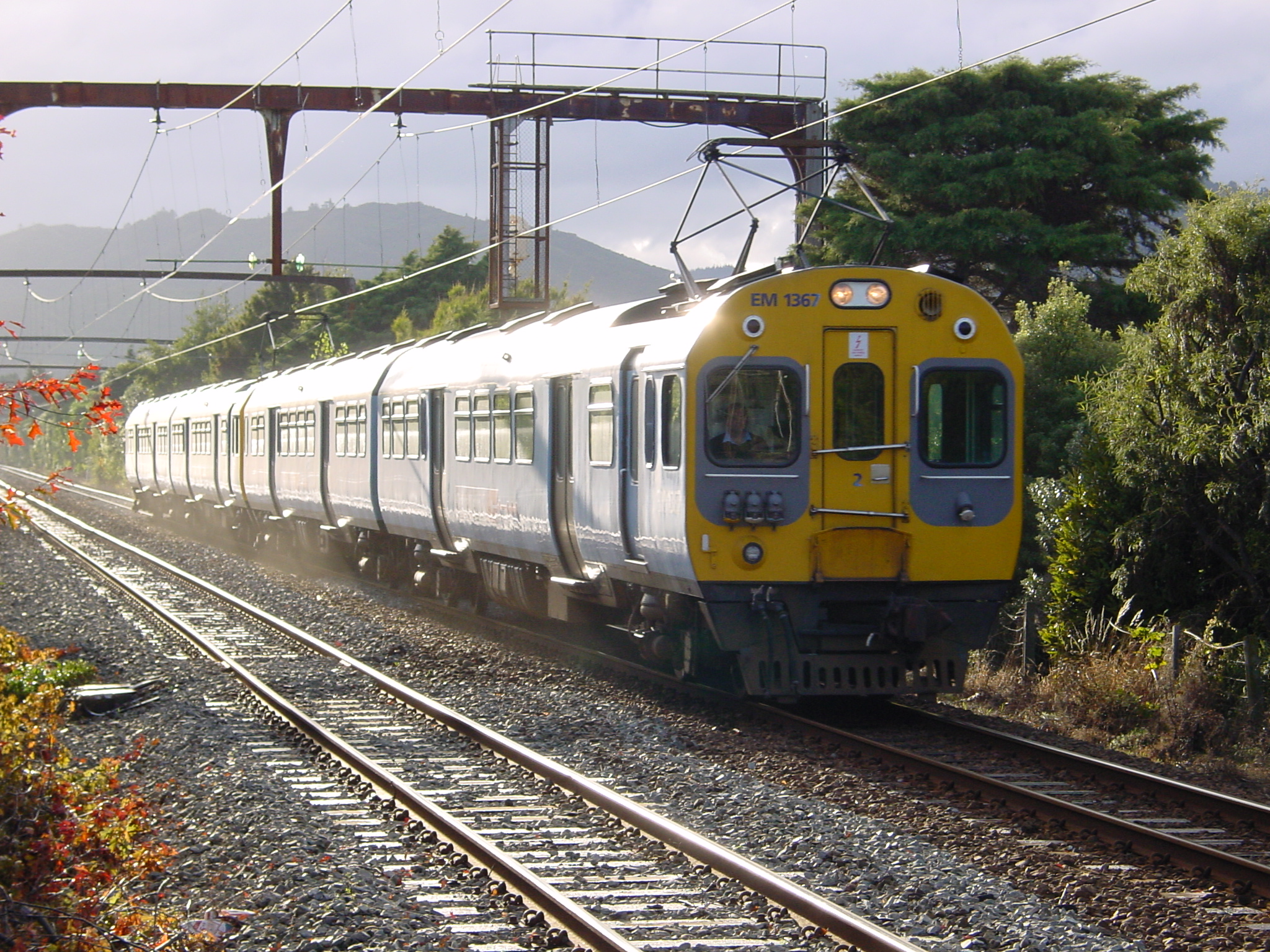
Tranz Metro EM class Ganz-MÁVAG unit in service in the Hutt Valley, New Zealand

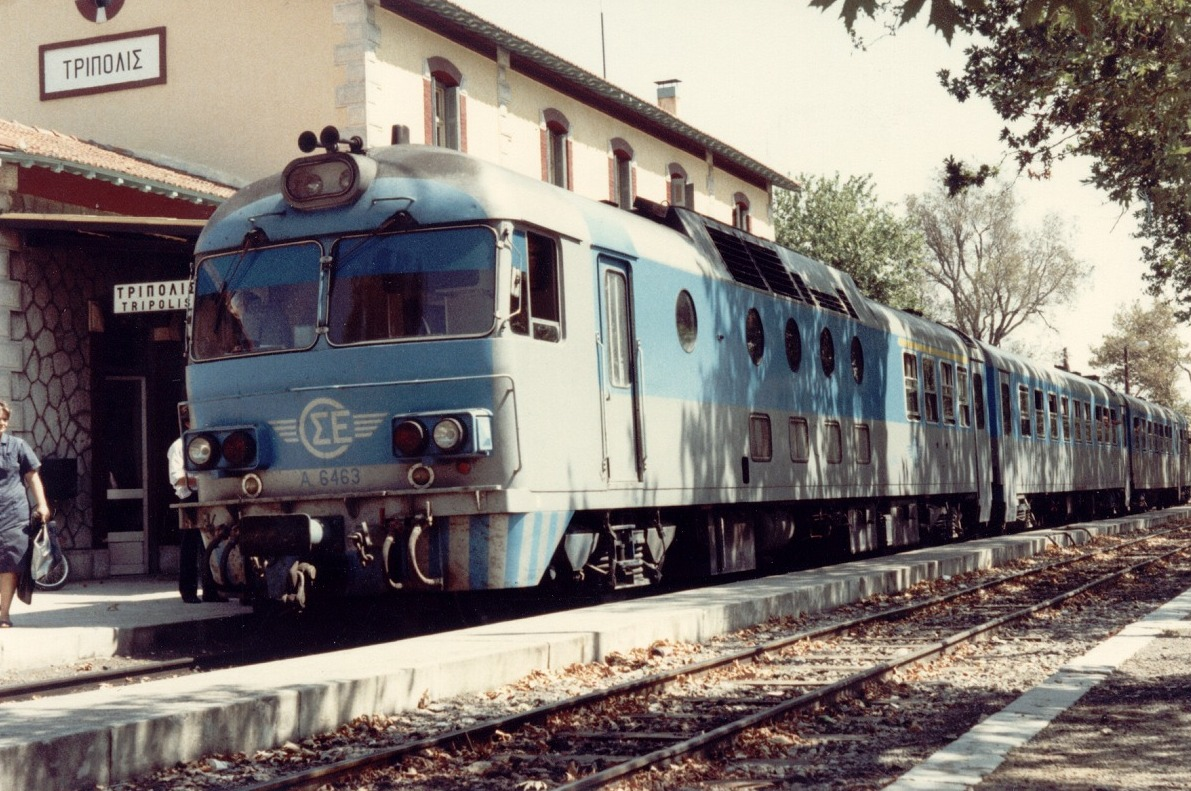
Metre gauge Ganz-MÁVAG trainset of Hellenic Railways Organisation (OSE) at Tripoli, Greece

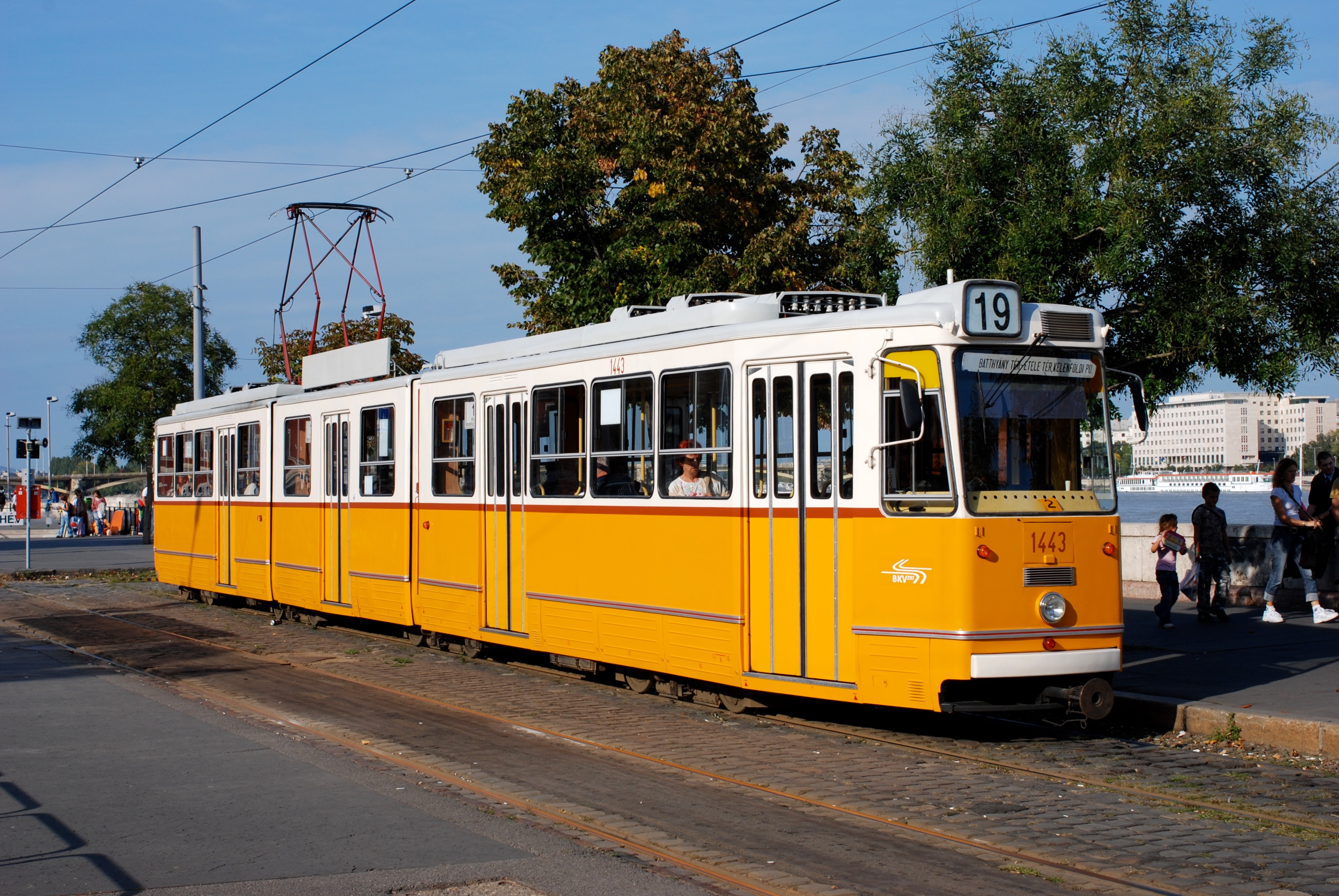
Ganz-MÁVAG CSMG tram for the Budapest tram (2007)

==== Ganz-MÁVAG rail rolling stock ====
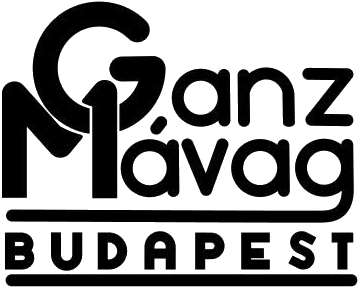
Logo of Ganz-Mávag, formed in 1959

In 1959 Ganz merged with the MÁVAG company and was renamed Ganz-MÁVAG. In 1976 Ganz-Mávag supplied ten standard gauge 3-car diesel trainset to the Hellenic Railways Organisation (OSE), designated as Class AA-91 and four metre gauge 4-car trainsets, designated as Class A-6451. In 1981/82 Ganz-Mávag supplied to OSE 11 B-B diesel-hydraulic DHM7-9 locomotives, designated as class A-251. Finally, in 1983, OSE bought eleven 3-car metre gauge trainsets, designated as Class A-6461. All these locomotives and trainsets have been withdrawn with the exception of one standard and one metre gauge trainset.

In 1982/83 Ganz-Mávag supplied an order for electric multiple units to New Zealand Railways Corporation for Wellington suburban services. The order was made in 1979, and was for 44 powered units and 44 trailer units, which entered service as the New Zealand EM class electric multiple units.

==== Ganz-MÁVAG Trams ====
Ganz-MÁVAG delivered 29 trams (2 car sets) to Alexandria, Egypt from 1985 to 1986.

=== Shipbuilding, Ganz - Danubius ===
In 1911, the Ganz Company merged with the Danubius shipbuilding company, which was the largest shipbuilding company in Hungary. From 1911, the unified company adopted the "Ganz–Danubius" brand name. In the beginning of the 20th century the company had 19 shipyards on the Danube and the Adriatic Sea in the cities of Fiume and Pola.

As Ganz-Danubius, the company became involved in shipbuilding before, and during, World War I. Ganz was responsible for building the dreadnought SMS Szent István, all of the Novara-class cruisers, all of the Tátra-class destroyers, and built diesel-electric U-boats at its shipyard in Budapest, for final assembly at Fiume. Several U-boats of the U-XXIX class, U-XXX class, U-XXXI class and U-XXXII class were completed. A number of other types were laid down, but remained incomplete at the war's end. Ganz-Danubius was contracted to build 2 of the 4 Ersatz Monarch-class superdreadnought battleships, the most ambitious and powerful warships Austria-Hungary attempted to build, but due to the outbreak of the war, construction of this class was postponed and eventually cancelled. By the end of the First World War, 116 naval vessels had been built by the Ganz-Danubius company. The company also produces transatlantic ocean liners for passenger lines Trieste - New York, Trieste - Montevideo, as a reflection of already formed wave of mass migration from Central Europe to America.

Ganz–Danubius ships and submarines

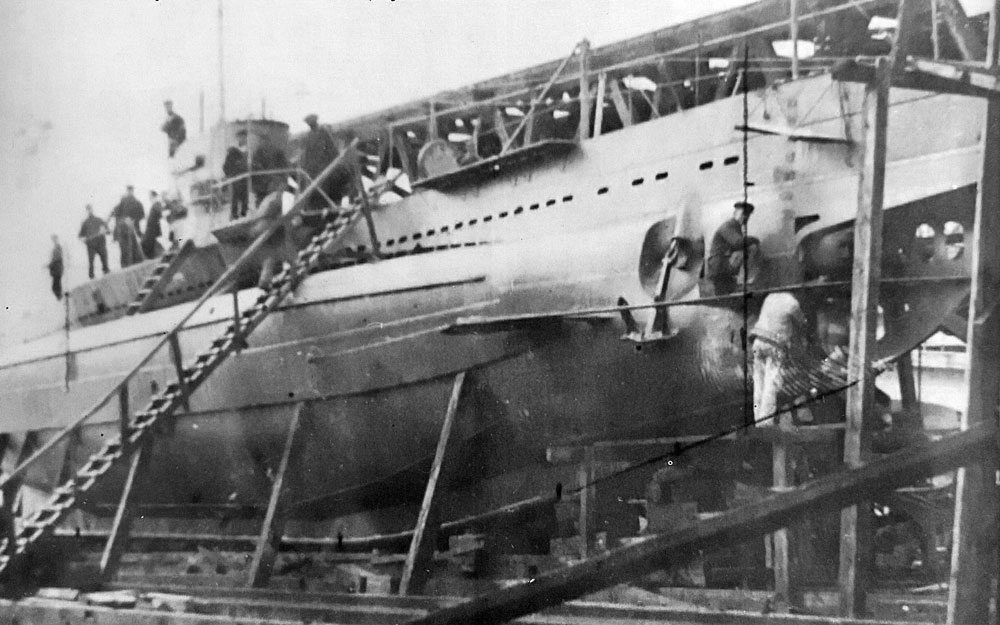
The back of the SM U-29 submarine during assembly (24 April 1916)

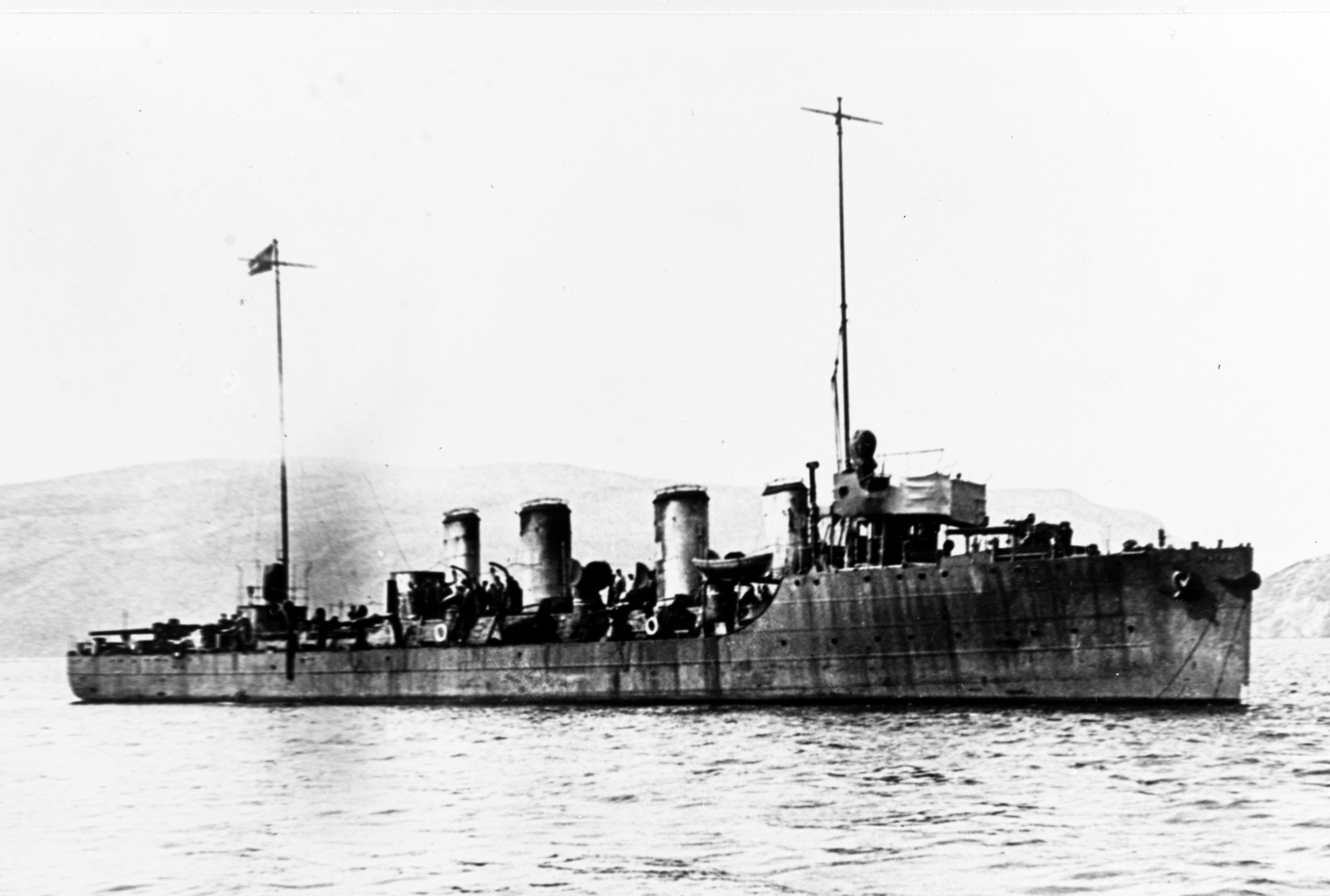
Lead ship of her class, destroyer SMS Tátra in 1913

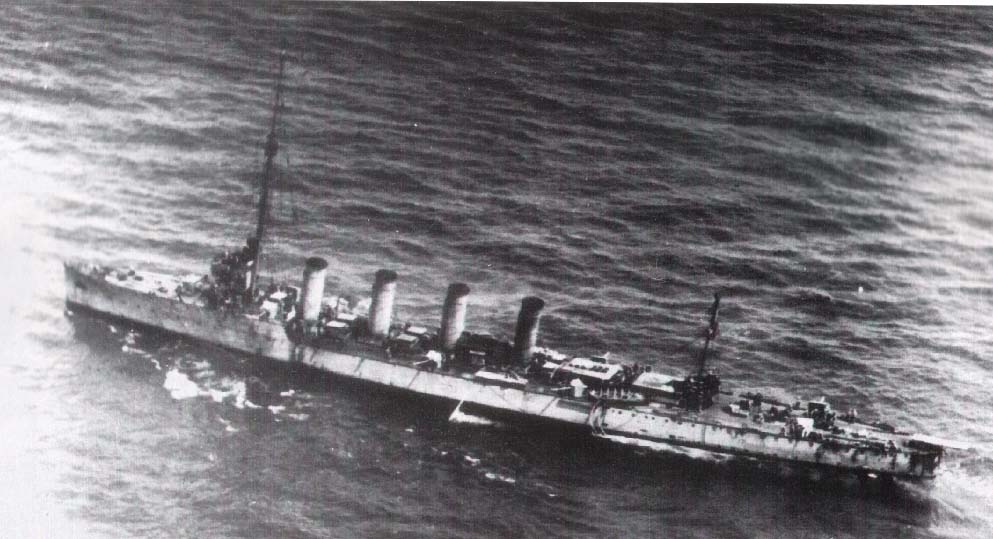
The battle-damaged SMS Novara (1913) after a victorious naval battle

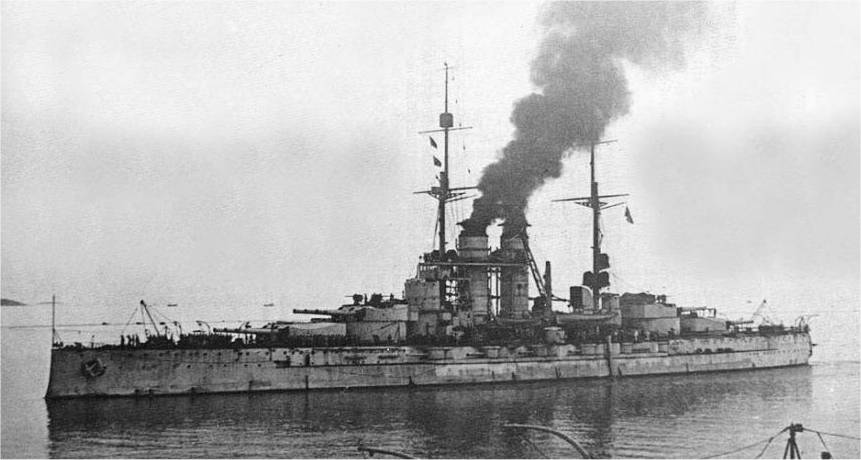
Hungarian built dreadnought battleship SMS Szent István at Pola (military dock)

Construction of SMS Szent István battleship in the Ganz-Danubius shipyard in Fiume (filmed 1912)

=== Aircraft ===
The first Hungarian "aeroplane factory" (UFAG) was founded by the Ganz Company and Weiss-Manfréd Works in 1912. During World War I, the company made many types of Albatros and Fokker fighter planes.

Before 1919, the company built ocean liners, dreadnought type battleships and submarines, power plants, automobiles and many types of fighter aircraft.

The world's first turboprop engine was the Jendrassik Cs-1 designed by the Hungarian mechanical engineer György Jendrassik. It was built and tested in the Ganz factory in Budapest between 1939 and 1942. It was planned to be fitted to the Varga RMI-1 X/H twin-engined reconnaissance bomber designed by László Varga in 1940, but the program was cancelled. Jendrassik had also designed a small-scale 75 kW turboprop in 1937.

== After World War II ==
In 1947, the Ganz Works was nationalised and in 1949 it became independent and six big companies came into existence, including the Ganz Transformer Factory. In 1959, Ganz Wagon and Machine Factory merged with the MÁVAG Locomotive and Machine Factory under the name of Ganz-MÁVAG Locomotive, Wagon and Machine Works. Of the products of the Works, outstanding results were shown in the field of the manufacture of diesel railcars and multiple units. Traditional products included tramcars as well, and customers included the tramway network of Budapest. In the meantime the Foundry workshop was closed down.

In 1974, the locomotive and wagon Works were merged under the name of Railway Vehicle Factory and then the machine construction branch went through significant development. The production of industrial and apartment house lifts became a new branch. Ganz-MÁVAG took over a lot of smaller plants in the 1960s and 1970s and their product range was extended. Among other things, they increased their bridge-building capacity. They made iron structures for several Tisza bridges, for the Erzsébet Bridge in Budapest, for public road bridges in Yugoslavia and for several industrial halls.

The Ganz Shipyard experienced its most productive times during the four decades following nationalisation. In the course of this period 1100 ship units were produced, the number of completed seagoing ships was 240 and that of floating cranes was 663. As a result of the great economic and social crises of the 1980s, Ganz-MÁVAG had to be reorganised. The company was transformed into seven independent Works and three joint ventures.

== Ganz since 1989 ==
In 1989, the British company Telfos Holdings gained a majority of the shares in Ganz Railway Vehicle Factory Co. Ltd. and the name of the company was changed to Ganz-Hunslet Co. Ltd. In the course of 1991 and 1992, the Austrian company Jenbacher Werke obtained 100% of the company's shares and consequently the railway vehicle factory is now a member of the international railway vehicle manufacturing group, Jenbacher Transport Systeme. At present, the Ganz Electric Works, under the name of Ganz-Ansaldo is a member of the Italian industrial giant, AnsaldoBreda. The Ganz Works were transformed into holdings. Ganz-Danubius was wound up in 1994. The Ganz Electric Meter Factory in Gödöllő became the member of the international Schlumberger group.

In 2006, the power transmission and distribution sectors of Ganz Transelektro were acquired by Crompton Greaves, but still doing business under the Ganz brand name, while the unit dealing with electric traction (propulsion and control systems for electric vehicles) was acquired by Škoda Transportation and is now a part of Škoda Electric.

Now the plant is operated by a new investor as a tenant, Ganz Transformer Motor and Manufacturing Ltd., after the previous owner was unable to finance the production.

Timeline

- 1991: Joint Venture with Italian Ansaldo named Ganz Ansaldo Ltd.
- 1994: Air-cooled turbogenerator from 20 up to 70MVA
- 1998: Development of double-cage induction motor for twin-drives first on the world
- 2000: Acquisition by Transelektro Group under name of Ganz-Transelektro
- 2001: Developed 1MW ExN Non-sparking gasturbine starter motors for GE
- 2002: First transformer in the world for 123 kV with ester liquid
- 2006: Became a Part of Crompton Greaves Ltd as CG Electric Systerms Hungary
- 2010: Start of manufacturing Safety Class 3&4 motors for Nuclear Power Plants
- 2018: Developing VFD-driven Increased Safety LVAC motors for driving OEM pumps used in Oil&gas fields
- 2020: Establishment of Ganz Transformer Motor and Generator Ltd., Ganz brand back in Hungarian ownership

== Divisions ==
- Transformer division – The Transformer division specializes in the design, manufacture and testing of substation transformers, generation transformers, auxiliary transformers, mobile transformers and traction transformers from 20 to 600 MVA (1000 MVA for autotransformers) from 52 to 800 kV.
- Rotating machines division – The production of three-phase, alternating current induction motors began in the factory in 1894. Through the 90's Ganz has developed more advanced motors with decreased total weight, increased efficiency and low noise levels in order to satisfy the actual needs of the market and all conditions of the industrial application and to conform to IEC, NEMA, ATEX and EAC standards.
- GIS Service Division – GIS Service division performs onsite works like maintenance, inspection, modification, overhaul, extensions on former GANZ and other brands of switchgears. The activity is mainly focused on the existing substations and equipment.
