= Ottó Bláthy =

Hungarian electrical engineer (1860-1939)

- Bláthy Ottó
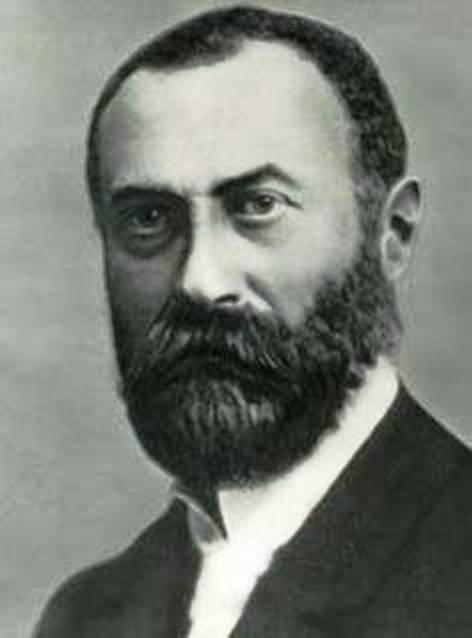
- Born: 11 August 1860; Tata, Austrian Empire
- Died: 26 September 1939 (aged 79); Budapest, Hungary
- Known for: Electric transformer, parallel AC connection, and AC electricity meter
- Scientific career
- Fields: Electrical engineering

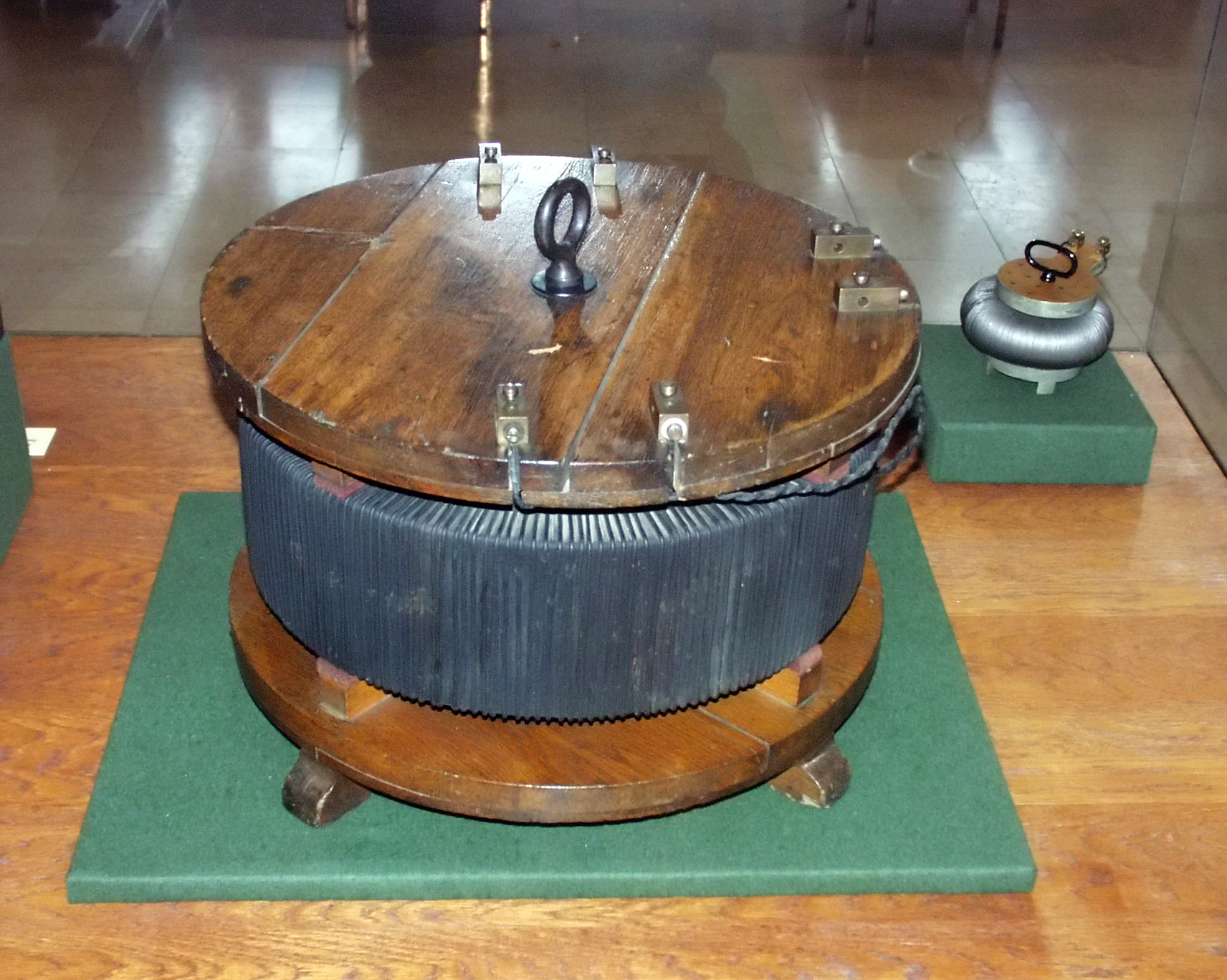
Prototypes of the world's first high-efficiency transformers, 1885 (Széchenyi István Memorial Exhibition Nagycenk)

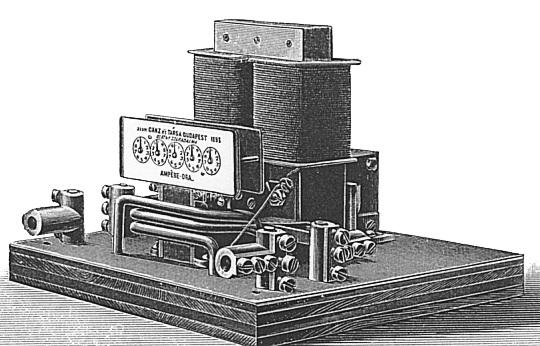
Bláthy's Wattmeter (1889)

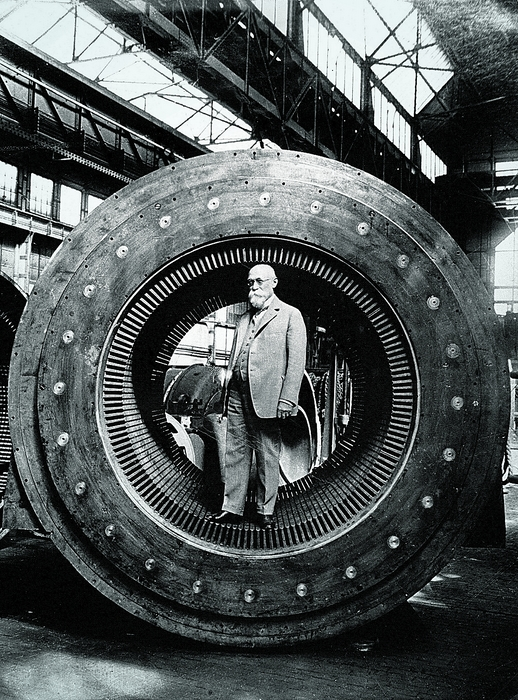
Ottó Bláthy in the armature of a Ganz turbo generator (1904)

Ottó Titusz Bláthy (11 August 1860 – 26 September 1939) was a Hungarian electrical engineer. During his career he became the co-inventor of the modern electric transformer, the voltage regulator, the AC watt-hour meter, the turbo generator, the high-efficiency turbo generator and the motor capacitor for the single-phase (AC) electric motor.

Bláthy's career as an inventor began during his time at the Ganz Works in 1883. There, he conducted experiments for creating a transformer. The name "transformer" was created by Bláthy. In 1885 the ZBD model alternating-current transformer was invented by three Hungarian engineers: Ottó Bláthy, Miksa Déri and Károly Zipernowsky. (ZBD comes from the initials of their names). In the autumn of 1889 he patented the AC watt-meter.

== Early life ==
He attended schools in Tata and Vienna, where he obtained diploma of machinery in 1882. Between 1881 and 1883 he worked at the machinery workshop of the Hungarian Railways (MAV). Attracted by the successes of Károly Zipernowsky, he joined his team on 1 July 1883. He admitted he had learnt nothing about electrotechnics in university, so he started to learn about the theory himself. Using the Maxwell equations he invented a practical approach of sizing magnetic coils. Kapp and Hopkinson (for whom Hopkinson's law is named) published their findings only later in 1886 and 1887, respectively.

== Professional life ==
His practical calculation method was crucial in building the first practical transformer. Based on his findings, he rebuilt his machines in 1883 and obtained better efficiency with the same weight. He was the first to investigate the heat dissipation problems of electric motors, and at that time the connection between current density and heat was determined.

At the Turin Italian National Exhibition in 1884, he saw Gaulard and Gibbs's "secondary generator"' (i.e. AC transformer) system, and he decided to improve it. Including a closed-loop magnetic field, based on the findings of Faraday, he conducted experiments with Miksa Déri in the summer of 1884 at the Ganz factory. Based on these experiments, they invented the transformer in 1885, which was unveiled at the Budapest National Exhibition in 1885. In the autumn of 1884, Károly Zipernowsky, Ottó Bláthy and Miksa Déri (ZBD), three Hungarian engineers associated with the Ganz Works, had determined that open-core devices were impracticable, as they were incapable of reliably regulating voltage. In their joint 1885 patent applications for novel transformers (later called ZBD transformers), they described two designs with closed magnetic circuits where copper windings were either wound around an iron wire ring core or surrounded by an iron wire core. The two designs were the first application of the two basic transformer constructions in common use to this day, termed "core form" or "shell form" . The Ganz factory had also in the autumn of 1884 made delivery of the world's first five high-efficiency AC transformers, the first of these units having been shipped on September 16, 1884. This first unit had been manufactured to the following specifications: 1,400 W, 40 Hz, 120:72 V, 11.6:19.4 A, ratio 1.67:1, one-phase, shell form.

In both designs, the magnetic flux linking the primary and secondary windings traveled almost entirely within the confines of the iron core, with no intentional path through air (see Toroidal cores below). The new transformers were 3.4 times more efficient than the open-core bipolar devices of Gaulard and Gibbs. The ZBD patents included two other major interrelated innovations: one concerning the use of parallel connected, instead of series connected, utilization loads, the other concerning the ability to have high turns ratio transformers such that the supply network voltage could be much higher (initially 1,400 to 2,000 V) than the voltage of utilization loads (100 V initially preferred). When employed in parallel connected electric distribution systems, closed-core transformers finally made it technically and economically feasible to provide electric power for lighting in homes, businesses and public spaces. Bláthy had suggested the use of closed cores, Zipernowsky had suggested the use of parallel shunt connections, and Déri had performed the experiments; In early 1885, the three engineers also eliminated the problem of eddy current losses with the invention of the lamination of electromagnetic cores.

The first specimen of the AC kilowatt-hour meter produced on the basis of Hungarian Ottó Bláthy's patent and named after him was presented by the Ganz Works at the Frankfurt Fair in the autumn of 1889, and the first induction kilowatt-hour meter was already marketed by the factory at the end of the same year. These were the first alternating-current watt-hour meters, known by the name of Bláthy-meters. The AC kilowatt hour meters used at present operate on the same principle as Bláthy's original invention.

In 1886 Blathy undertook a journey to America, where he also visited the Edison Works. It was there that he observed that the parameters of the exciting coils of the machines to be produced were established on the basis of empirically set charts. Blathy proved that these data can be derived from rigorous calculations as well, thus winning the admiration of the engineers at the factory. He did not stay in America for a long time.

Based on the opinions of Galileo Ferraris, the Italian government ordered a power transformer for Rome, which was installed in October 1886. Later, they designed a power plant for Tivoli, built by Ganz, with six water turbines and 5000 V, which were worked in parallel with the old steam engine generators. This was the first time in history two high-voltage power plants were connected.

== Chess works ==
Besides his scientific work, Bláthy is well known as an author of chess problems. He specialized in the field of very long moremovers, also known as longmovers. (see grotesque (chess) for one of his problems).
