= Károly Zipernowsky =

Hungarian engineer

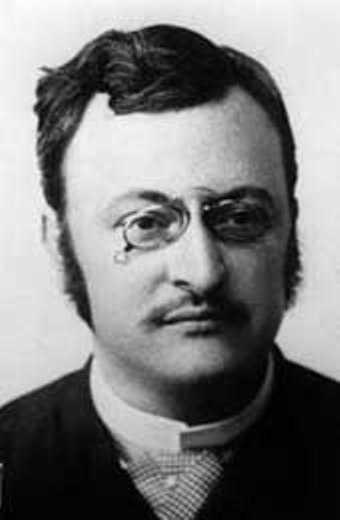
- Károly Zipernowsky
- Born: Carl Zipernowsky; 4 April 1853; Vienna, Austrian Empire
- Died: 29 November 1942; Budapest, Hungary
- Education: Technical University of Budapest
- Engineering career
- Institutions: Ganz Works
- Projects: transformer alternating current

Károly Zipernowsky (born as Carl Zipernowsky, 4 April 1853 in Vienna – 29 November 1942 in Budapest) was an Austrian-born Hungarian electrical engineer. He invented the transformer with his colleagues (Miksa Déri and Ottó Bláthy) at the famous Hungarian manufacturing company Ganz Works and he contributed significantly with his works also to other AC technologies.

== Biography ==
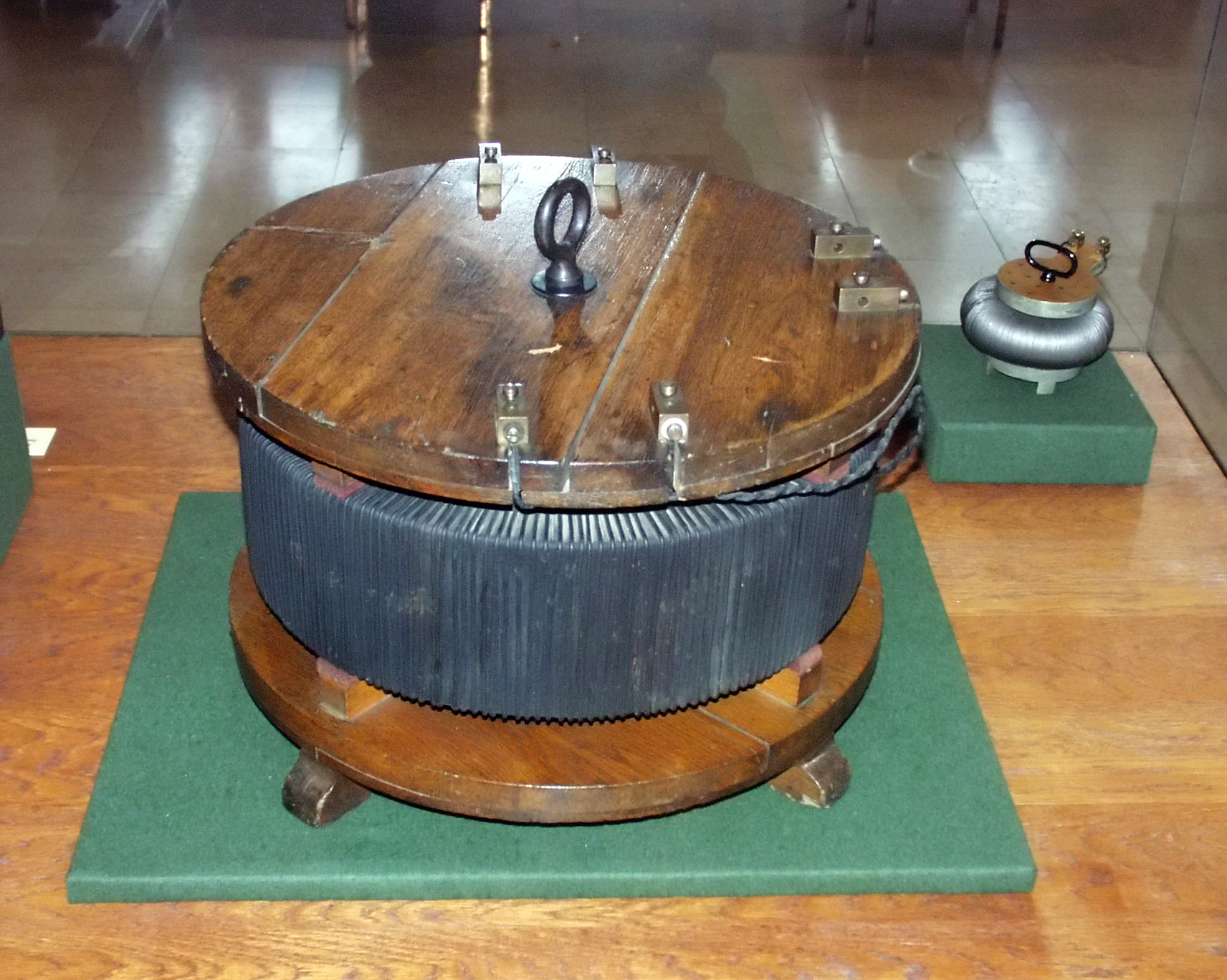
Prototypes of the world's first high-efficiency transformers. (Széchenyi István Memorial Exhibition Nagycenk)

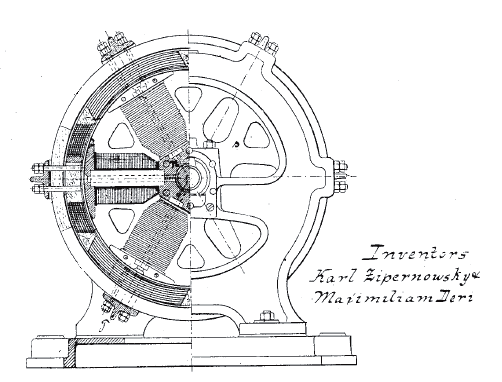
Dynamo Electric Machine [End View, Partly Section] (U.S. patent 284,110)

Magnetizing Current Shunt Circuit (U.S. patent 284,110)

Zipernowsky was born on April 4, 1853, in Wien and received his primary education at the Piarist grammar school in Pest. He worked as a pharmacist in Kecskemét and then moved to the faculty of mechanical engineering of the Technical University in Budapest. His interest gradually brought him to the electrical engineering, and during his university years, he worked as a draftsman in the office of the Austrian State Railway Company. In his spare time, he created electrical appliances. After graduating, he went to work at the Ganz Works Company.

Zipernowsky, with Ottó Bláthy and Miksa Déri, all of Ganz and Company, were researching ways of increasing efficiency of electrical power transmission. They experimented with power supplies and current transformation, which led to the invention of the ZBD alternating current transformer in 1885. The ZBD system is based on a closed-iron ring core with an arbitrary diameter and a coil around the core, which conducts AC current. Their system converted higher voltage suitable for energy transmission to lower "service"-level voltage (step-down transformer). Nikola Tesla then proposed the use of step-up transformers, which would output higher voltage than they received. This principle is widely used for power transmission over long distances all over the world.

In 1891, he authored the first technically viable proposal for a high-speed railway, proposing an electric railway between Vienna and Budapest with electric multiple unit trains running at 250 kph (160 mph).

He became corresponding member of the Hungarian Academy of Sciences in 1893, and president of the Hungarian Society of Electrical Engineers in 1905. Károly Zipernowsky died on 29 November, 1942, in Budapest at the age of 90.
