= László Verebélÿ =

Electrical engineer, university professor (1883–1959)

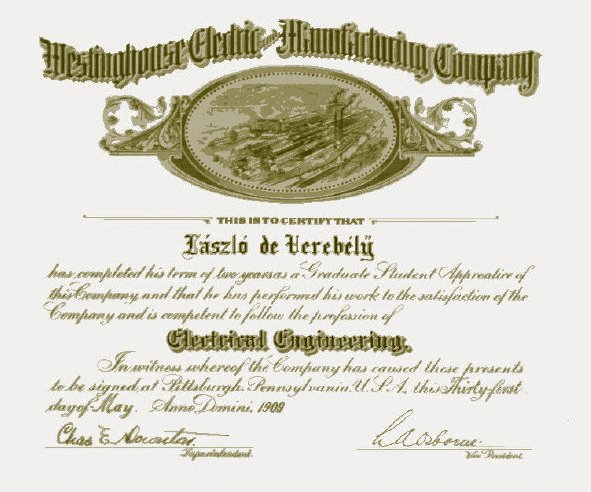
László Verebélÿ's degree in electrical engineering

László Verebélÿ (27 August 1883, in Budapest – 22 November 1959, in Budapest) was a Hungarian university professor and electrical engineer. He worked in Hungary, Italy, Germany, Austria, England and the United States and did important work on the development of Hungary's electricity network after World War I.

== Biography ==
He attended the Pestian Graduate Grammar School and then earned a mechanical engineering diploma at the Royal József University in 1906. After completing his university years, he spent a short time working in Germany and England. He then obtained employment at the Westinghouse Electric and Manufacturing Company in Pittsburgh, USA. Here he worked as a workshop trainee for two years and as a group leader for another two years. He participated in the training organized by the factory. After completing this, in 1909 he passed an examination and obtained an electrical engineering diploma. For a short time he worked at the factory's design department and then returned to Europe.

From 1910 to 1911, he was assistant professor at the Technical University of Karlsruhe, working with Professor Arnold. In addition to teaching, he participated in the first university degree in electrical engineering in Europe. In 1911, he returned to Hungary and became an engineer at the Ganz Works. On 22 June 1912, he married in Budapest. He also contacted Kálmán Kandó, who was head of the Societe Italiana Westinghouse electric locomotive factory in Italy. Kandó invited him to Italy and entrusted him with the factory's billing and planning office. In 1913 Verebélÿ moved to Vado Ligure with his family and participated in the planning and production of the two most successful Kandó locomotives for express trains.

== After World War I ==
From 1917 to 1918, he was posted to the railway division of Allgemeine Elektrizitäts Gesellschaft (AEG) in Vienna. He then returned to Hungary and, in 1918, he became head of the electrical department of the Hungarian State Railways (MÁV). He outlined his first study in 1919, in which the issue of railway expansion was examined in terms of national energy management. The idea was put into its final form in his 1923 study. This was based on the establishment of eight national power plants based on Hungary's coal assets, predominantly in Transdanubia. The western part of the country was favoured because the Treaty of Trianon had less truncated this area, the railway network remained unchanged, and most of the industry was settled there. The power plants to be built to the east of the Danube were designed to supply the industrial area near Miskolc and to create the electrical base of the Great Hungarian Plain. The study was based on the use of two coal-fired power plants in Miskolc and the use of the Pearl-Hatvan lignite field in Szolnok. The Esztergom coal basin supplied the Budapest power plant, while the Tatabánya and Dorog mines already supplied existing local electricity producers with fuel. The Pécsújhegy Power Plant was built to use coal from the Mecsek coalfields.

== World Energy Conference in 1924 ==
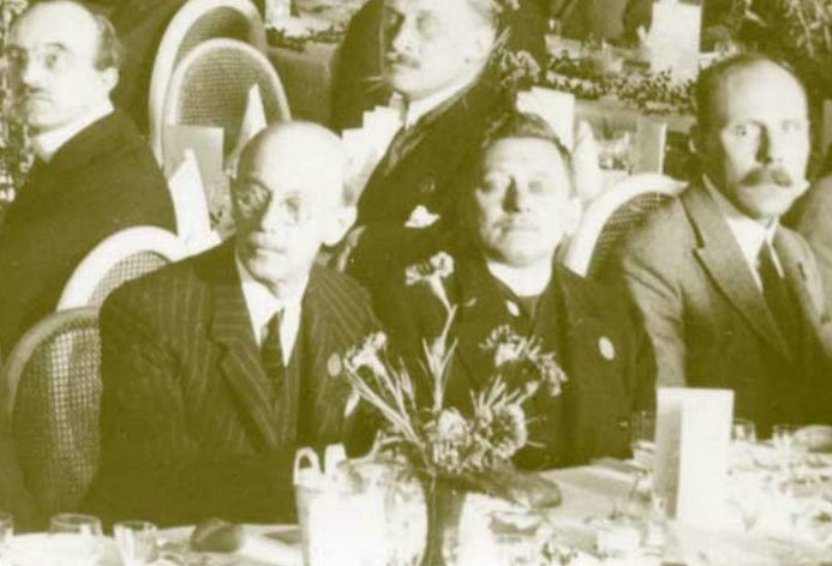
Kálmán Kandó, Ernő Vilczek and László Verebélÿ (right) at the 1924 World Energy Conference

At the first World Energy Conference in 1924, Kandó and Verebélÿ introduced the Transdanubian electrification plan. As a first step, A 75 MW power station and a connecting 100 kV power line of 150–200 km were built and the Budapest-Hegyeshalom railway line was electrified. This raised the interest of English financial circles, and after long negotiations, they made an offer in 1926, some of which was guaranteed by the British Treasury. The offer was accepted in 1927 by Hungary and the Hungarian Transdanubian Electricity Company was established to manage it.

In the meantime, Verebely and Kandó prepared for railway expansion. Kandó's idea of supplying the railway from the industrial-frequency (50 Hz) power system complemented Verebely's electricity management plans.

== Scientific and educational activity ==
He was appointed as a public university professor at the Department of Electrotechnics (later Department of Electrical Engineering). From 1936 to 1937 he was dean of the Faculty of Mechanical Engineering and Chemical Engineering, and the following year the Chair of the Mechanical Engineering Department at the Faculty.

After the World War II, he restored teaching at the faculty and lectures began in April, 1945. He was one of the first heads of the Faculty of Electrical Engineering in 1949. Meanwhile, he produced his four-volume work "Electric Power Transmission". He was greatly interested in the history of electrical engineering. In 1930 he drew world attention to the work of Ányos Jedlik (1800-1895) a Hungarian scientist, inventor and Benedictine monk.

He was vice president of the Hungarian Association of Electrotechnics between 1935 and 1938 and, until 1941, he was chairman and later co-chairman.

== Final years ==
He retired in 1957, after which he worked on publishing his books until his death in 1959. He was buried at the Farkasréti Cemetery on 26 November 1959.
