= Science and technology in Hungary =

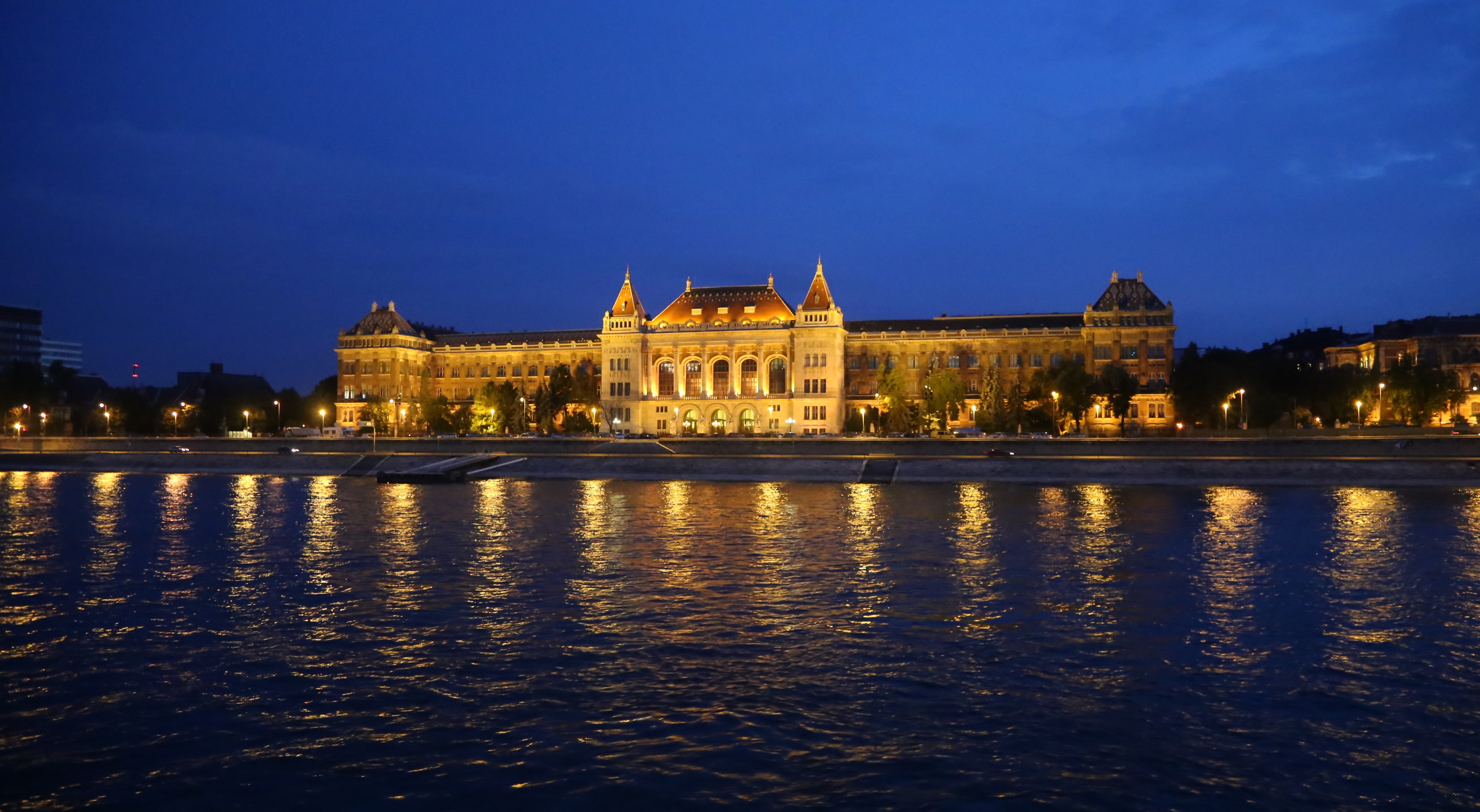
Main Building of the Budapest University of Technology and Economics, it is the oldest Institute of technology in the world, founded in 1782

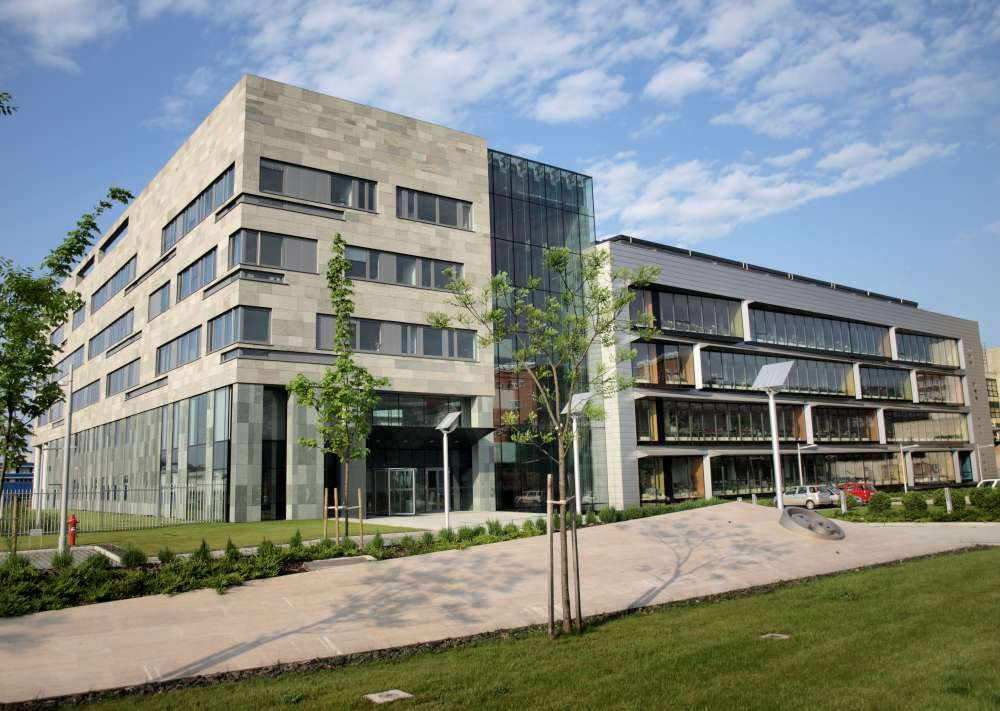
Research and development centre of Gedeon Richter Plc. in Budapest, one of the largest biotechnology company in Central and Eastern Europe

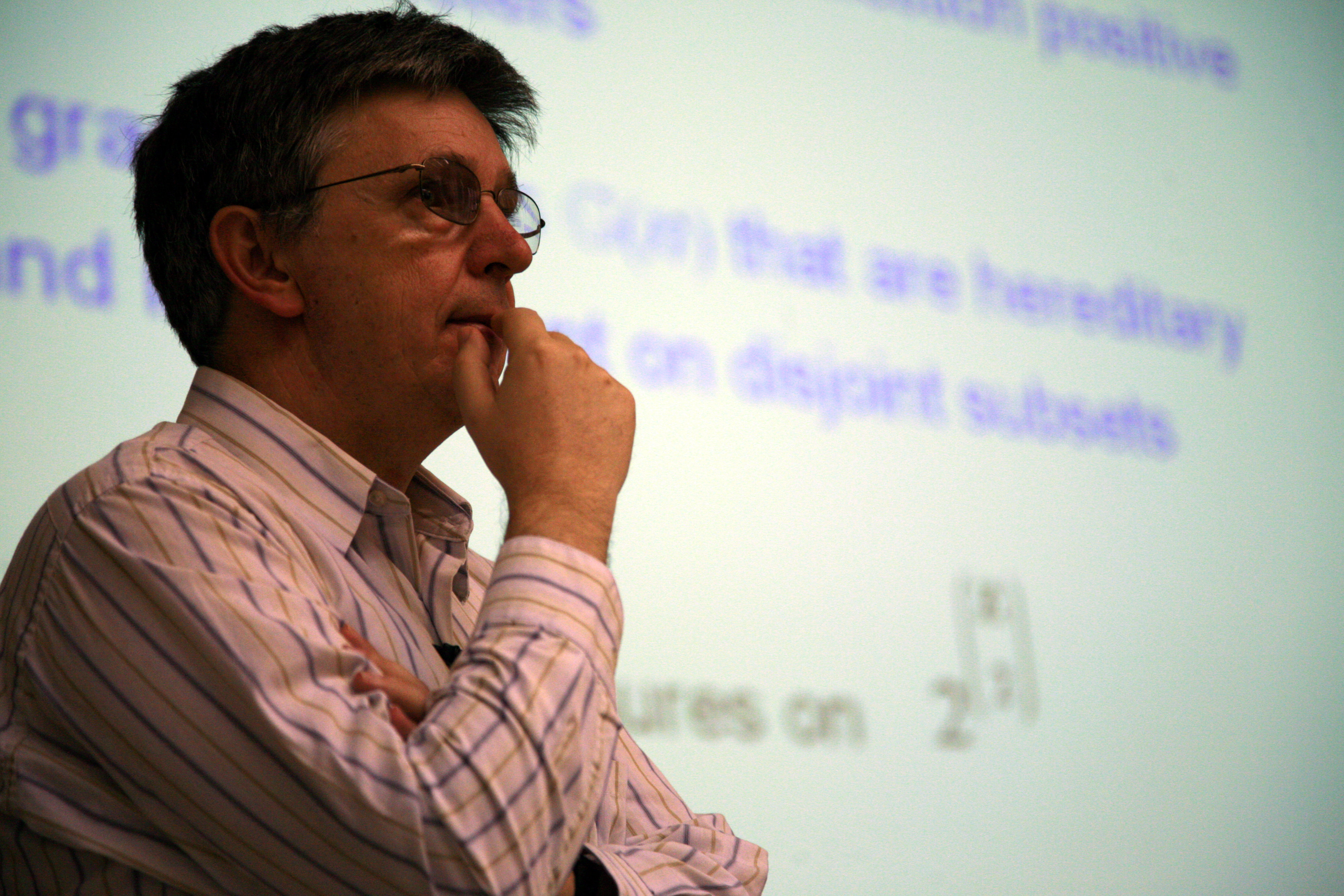
László Lovász was awarded the Wolf Prize and the Knuth Prize in 1999, and the Kyoto Prize in 2010; he is the current president of the Hungarian Academy of Sciences. Previously he served as the president of International Mathematical Union.

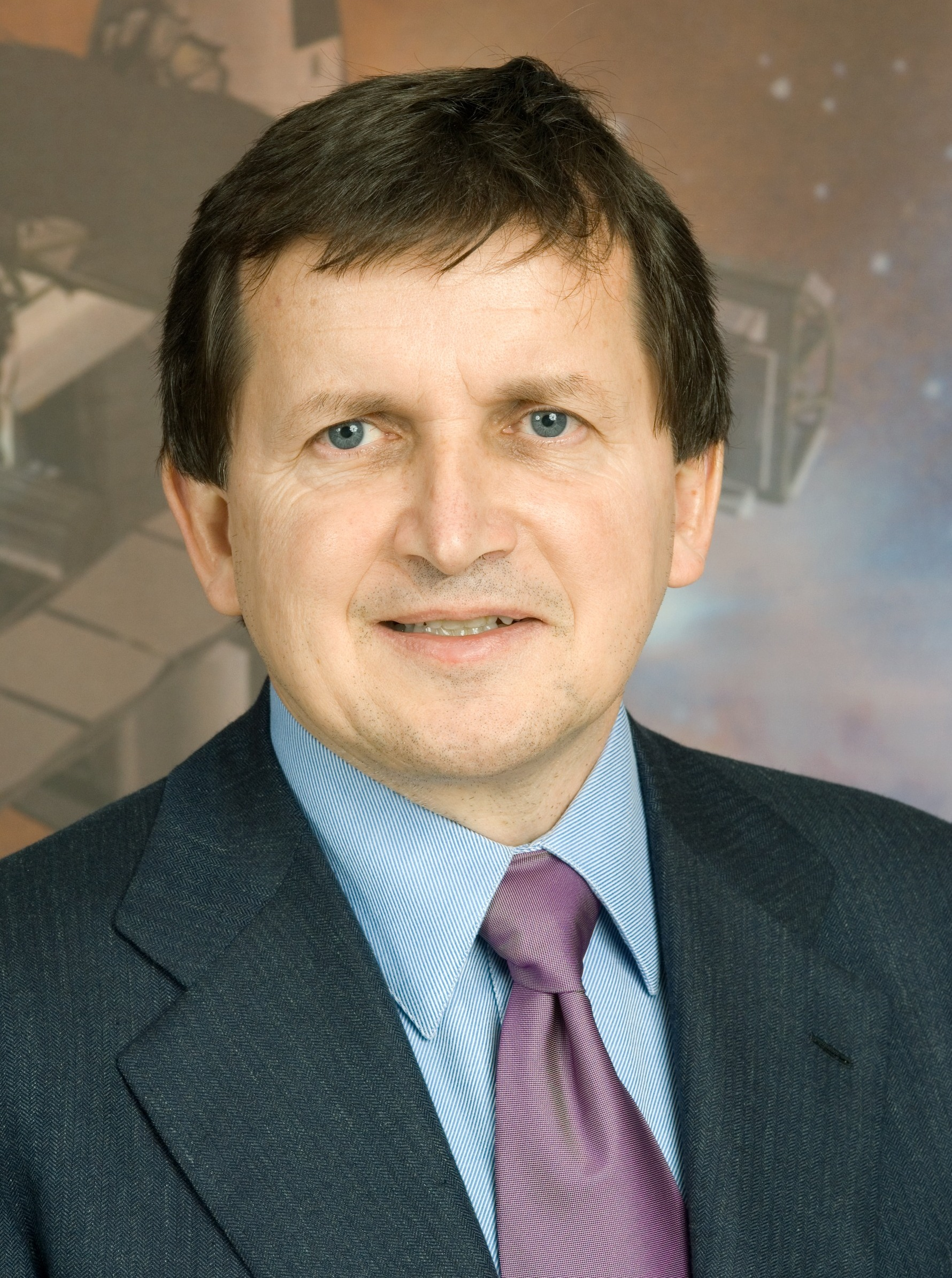
Charles Simonyi, the chief-architect of Microsoft Office. In April 2007, aboard Soyuz TMA-10, he became the fifth space tourist and the second Hungarian in space. In March 2009, aboard Soyuz TMA-14, he made a second trip to the International Space Station.

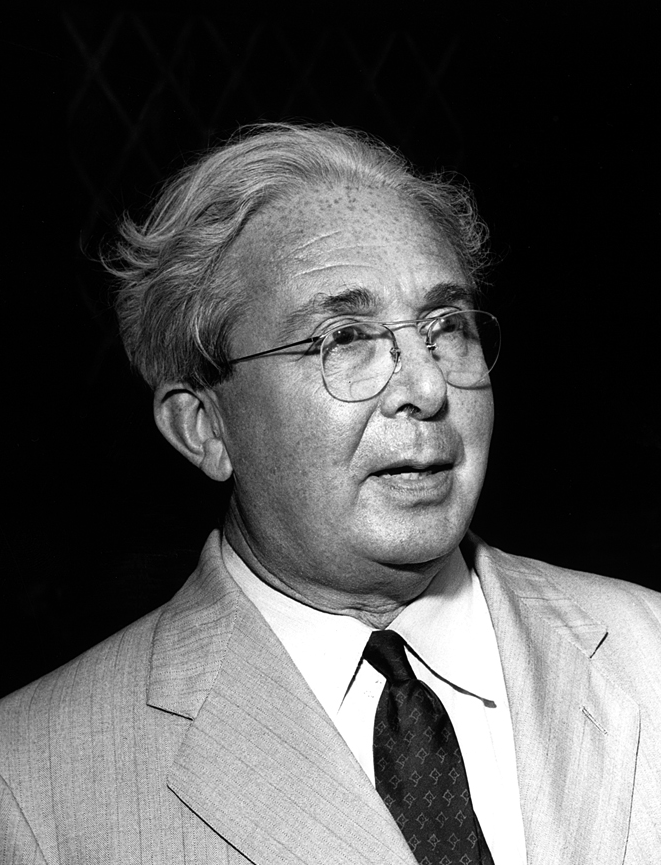
Leó Szilárd, hypothesized the concept of a nuclear chain reaction (and was one of the first to realize the feasibility of an atomic bomb), and submitted early patents for the nuclear reactor, electron microscope, and cyclotron.

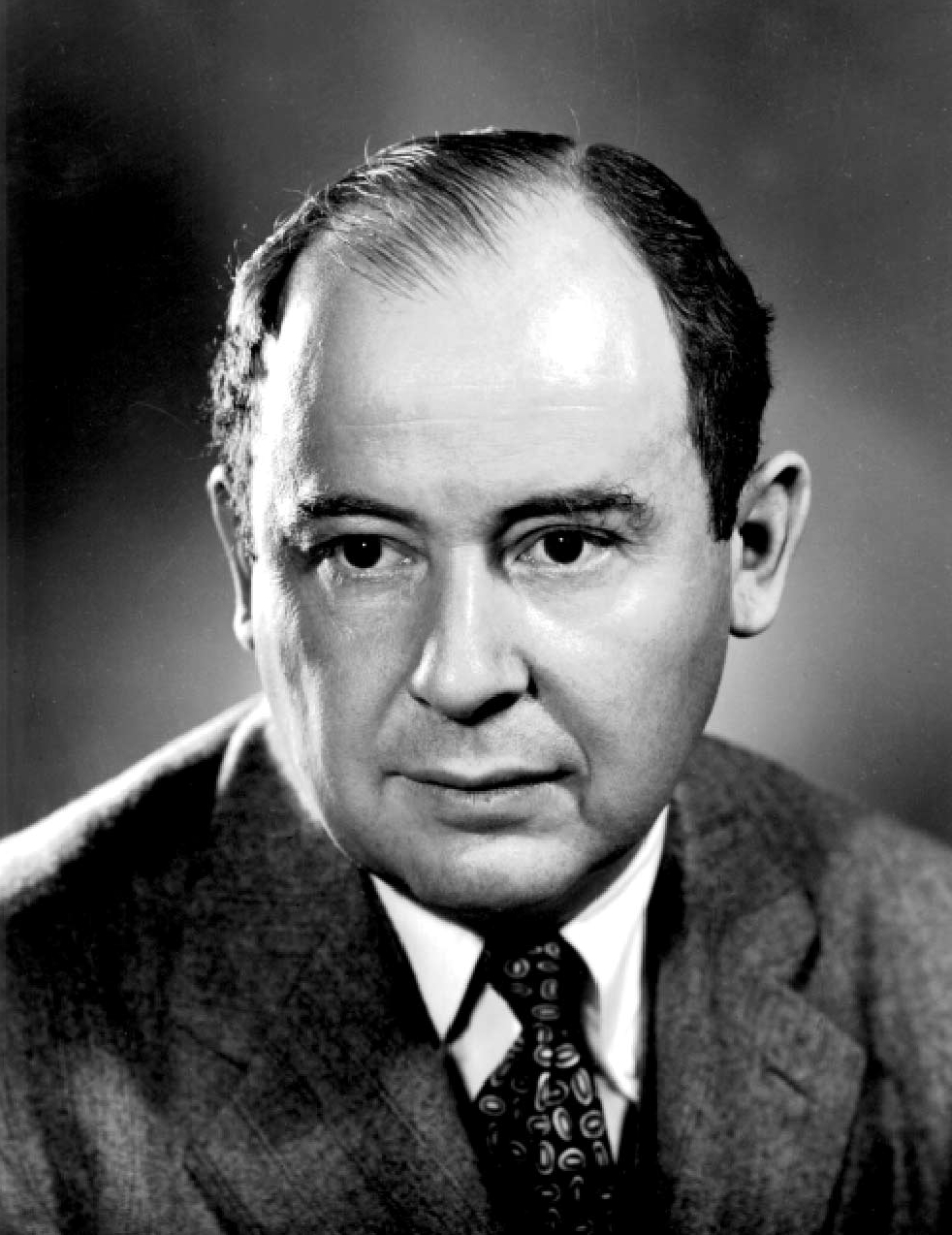
John von Neumann, one of the greatest mathematicians in modern history

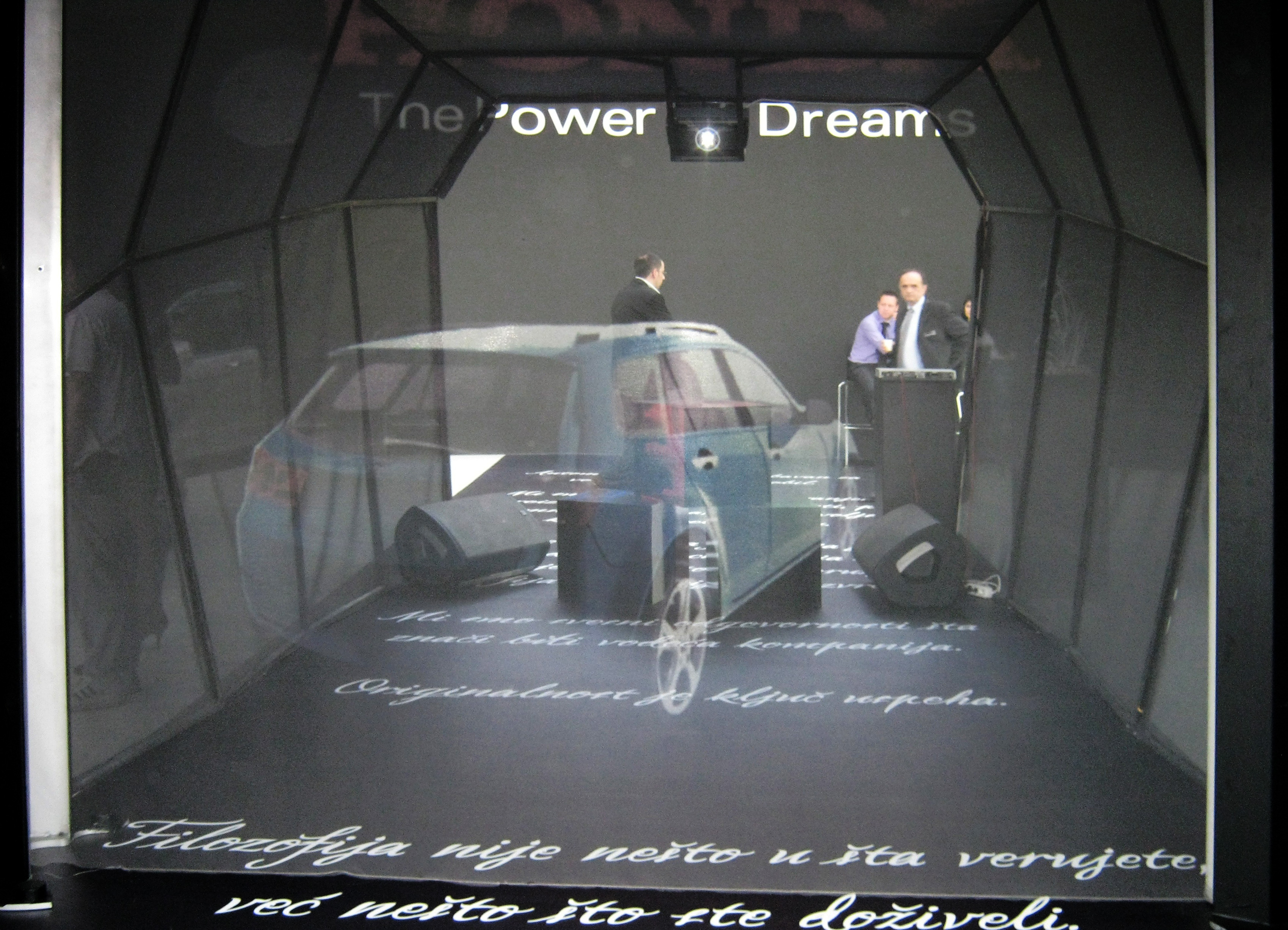
Holography was invented by Hungarian Dennis Gabor, a Nobel Laureate in Physics.

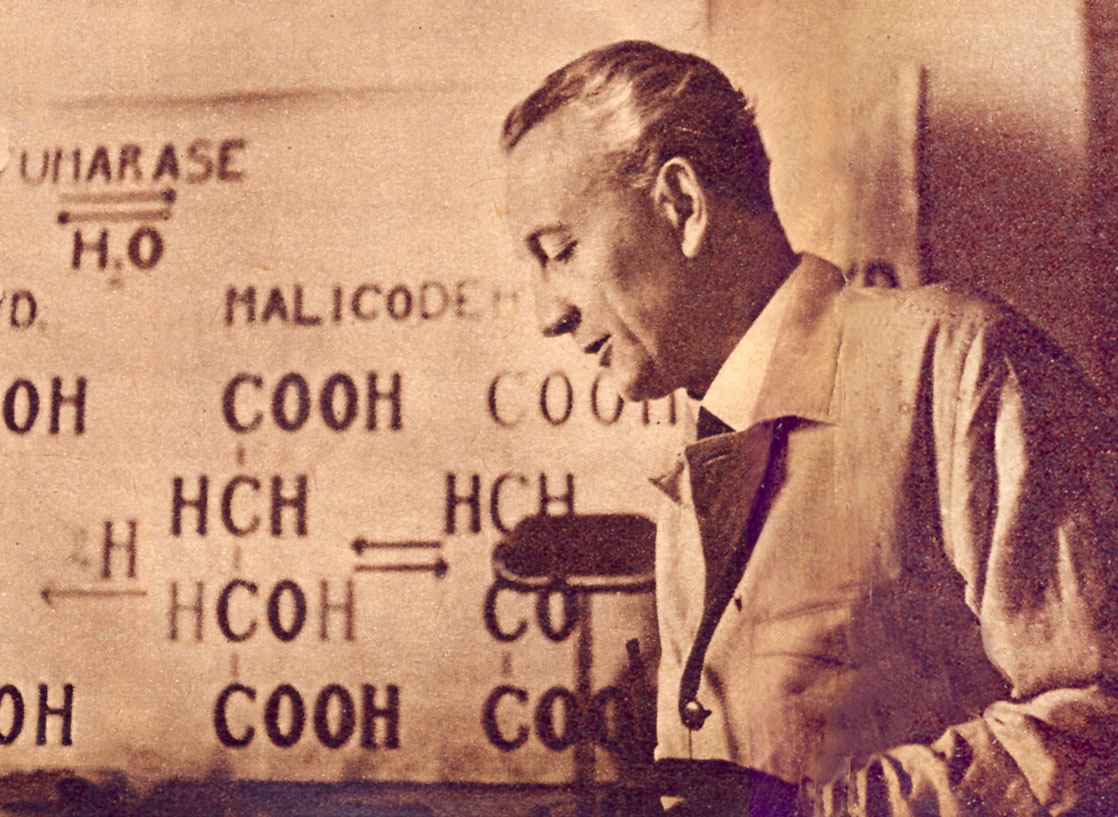
Albert Szent-Györgyi a Nobel Laureate in Medicine for discovery of Vitamin C

Science and technology is one of Hungary's most developed sectors. The country spent 1.4% of its gross domestic product (GDP) on civil research and development in 2015, which is the 25th-highest ratio in the world. Hungary ranks 32nd among the most innovative countries in the Bloomberg Innovation Index, standing before Hong Kong, Iceland or Malta. Hungary was ranked 36th in the Global Innovation Index in 2025.

In 2014, Hungary counted 2,651 full-time-equivalent researchers per million inhabitants, steadily increasing from 2,131 in 2010 and compares with 3,984 in the US or 4,380 in Germany. Hungary's high technology industry has benefited from both the country's skilled workforce and the strong presence of foreign high-tech firms and research centres. Hungary also has one of the highest rates of filed patents, the 6th highest ratio of high-tech and medium high-tech output in the total industrial output, the 12th-highest research FDI inflow, placed 14th in research talent in business enterprise and has the 17th-best overall innovation efficiency ratio in the world.

The key actor of research and development in Hungary is the National Research, Development and Innovation Office (NRDI Office), which is a national strategic and funding agency for scientific research, development and innovation, the primary source of advice on RDI policy for the Hungarian government, and the primary RDI funding agency. Its role is to develop RDI policy and ensure that Hungary adequately invest in RDI by funding excellent research and supporting innovation to increase competitiveness and to prepare the RDI strategy of the Hungarian Government, to handle the National Research, Development and Innovation Fund, and represents the Hungarian Government and a Hungarian RDI community in international organizations.

The Hungarian Academy of Sciences and its research network is another key player in Hungarian R&D and it is the most important and prestigious learned society of Hungary, with the main responsibilities of the cultivation of science, dissemination of scientific findings, supporting research and development and representing Hungarian science domestically and around the world. In 2018, Hungary's parliament allowed transferring a large part of the budget of the Hungarian Academy of Sciences to the country's newly established Ministry of Innovation and Technology.

== Research universities and institutions ==
A mining school called "Berg Schola", the world's first institute of technology was founded in Selmecbánya, Kingdom of Hungary (today Banská Štiavnica, Slovakia), in 1735. Its legal successor is the University of Miskolc and the University of Sopron in Hungary.

BME University is considered the world's oldest institute of technology which has university rank and structure. It was the first institute in Europe to train engineers at university level.

Among Hungary's numerous research universities, the Eötvös Loránd University, founded in 1635, is one of the largest and the most prestigious public higher education institutions in Hungary. The 28,000 students at ELTE are organized into eight faculties, and into research institutes located throughout Budapest. ELTE is affiliated with 5 Nobel laureates, as well as winners of the Wolf Prize, Fulkerson Prize and Abel Prize, the latest of which was Abel Prize winner Endre Szemerédi in 2012.

Semmelweis University in the recently released QS World University Rankings 2016 listed among the world's best 151–200 universities in the categories of medicine and pharmacy. According to the international ranking in the field of medicine Semmelweis University ranked first among the Hungarian universities. The "Modern Medical Technologies at Semmelweis University" project ensuring institution's place among the leading research universities in four main areas: Personalised medicine; Imaging processes and bioimaging: from molecule to the human being; Bio-engineering and nanomedicine; Molecular medicine.

Budapest University of Technology and Economics's research activities encouraged and is present on all levels from the B.Sc. through to the doctoral level. During the 1980s the BUTE was among the first in the Eastern bloc to recognise the importance of participating in research activities with institutions in Western Europe. Consequently, the university has the most well-established research relationships with Western European universities. There are many famous alumni at university: Dennis Gabor who was the inventor of holography got his Nobel Prize in Physics in 1971, George Oláh got his Nobel Prize in Chemistry in 1994. Nowadays the university has 110 departments, 1100 lecturers, 400 researchers.

University of Szeged research activities are important parts of its educational mission. Its research include basic and applied research, creative arts, product and service development. University of Debrecen with a student body of about 30 thousand is one of the largest institutions of higher education in Hungary and its areas of research include: molecular science; physical, computational and material science; medical, health, environmental and agricultural science; linguistics, culture and bioethics. University of Pécs is one of the research universities in the country with a professional research background. The Szentágothai Research Centre of the University of Pécs covers aspects of education, research and innovation in the fields of biomedical, natural and environmental sciences. The infrastructure, instrumentation and expertise of the 22 research groups operating on the premises provide important research facilities for Hungary as well as in Central Europe with an extensive network.

Hungarian Academy of Sciences's research network also contributes significantly to research output of Hungary. It comprises 15 legally independent research institutions and more than 130 research groups at universities co-financed by the academy. This research network focusing above all on discovery research is unparalleled in Hungary, accounting for one-third of all scientific publications produced in the country. Citation indices of publications posted by the academy's researchers surpass the Hungarian average by 25.5%. The research network addresses discovery and targeted research, in cooperation with universities and corporations. The main components of the network are the MTA Szeged Research Centre for Biology, the MTA Institute for Computer Science and Control, the MTA Rényi Institute of Mathematics, the MTA Research Centre for Natural Sciences, the MTA Institute of Nuclear Research, the MTA Institute of Experimental Medicine, MTA Wigner Research Centre for Physics, the MTA Centre for Energy Research and MTA Research Centre for Astronomy and Earth Sciences (involved with Konkoly Observatory).

== Venture capital market ==
According to the HVCA (Hungarian Venture Capital and Private Equity Association) report joint efforts of the venture capital and private equity industry and the Hungarian government, the access of Hungarian enterprises to venture capital and private equity funding could be significantly increased. During the past two decades these financial intermediaries have also played an increasingly important role in the Hungarian economy. During this period, venture capital and private equity funds invested close to 4 billion US Dollars into more than 400 Hungarian enterprises.

However, so-called buyout transactions have accounted for about two thirds of the total volume of those investments, which were aimed at the acquisition of shares in mature companies that have been operating profitably for several years. The volume of investments in early and expansive stage companies was significantly lower. Only about 30% of the total volume of investments was directed at companies in the expansive stage and less than 5% at early stage companies. This is also reflected by the fact that over the last two decades slightly more than 10% of the total volume of venture capital and private equity investments came from funds focusing on early stage companies. The remaining close to 90% was invested by private equity funds focusing on more mature companies with greater economic strength. As for the number of transactions, companies in the expansive stage were targeted by the largest number of venture capital and private equity investments: such investments accounted for almost 60% of Hungarian transactions. Nearly a third of transactions involved early stage companies. Buy-out deals represented approximately 10% of transactions by number. Several factors have contributed to this growth. These include tax exemptions on Hungarian venture capital, funds established in conjunction with large international banks and financial companies and the involvement of major organizations desirous to capitalize on the strengths of Hungarian start up and high-tech companies. In recent years, the share of venture capital invested in the growth stages of enterprises has flourished at the expense of early stage investments.

== Nobel Prize laureates ==
Since the first Hungarian won a Nobel Prize in 1905, the country has added a further 14 to its cache. With scientists, writers and economists all honored in the prestigious awards:

Year	Winner	Field	Contribution
1905	Philipp Lenard	Physics	"for his work on cathode rays"
1914	Robert Bárány	Medicine	"for his work on the physiology and pathology of the vestibular apparatus"
1925	Richard Adolf Zsigmondy	Chemistry	"for his demonstration of the heterogeneous nature of colloid solutions and for the methods he used, which have since become fundamental in modern colloid chemistry"
1937	Albert Szent-Györgyi	Medicine	"for his discoveries in connection with the biological combustion processes, with special reference to vitamin C and the catalysis of fumaric acid"
1943	George de Hevesy	Chemistry	"for his work on the use of isotopes as tracers in the study of chemical processes"
1961	Georg von Békésy	Medicine	"for his discoveries of the physical mechanism of stimulation within the cochlea"
1963	Eugene Wigner	Physics	"for his contributions to the theory of the atomic nucleus and the elementary particles, particularly through the discovery and application of fundamental symmetry principles"
1971	Dennis Gabor	Physics	"for his invention and development of the holographic method"
1986	John Polanyi	Chemistry	"for their contributions concerning the dynamics of chemical elementary processes"
1994	George Olah	Chemistry	"for his contribution to carbocation chemistry"
1994	John Harsanyi	Economics	"pioneering analysis of equilibria in the theory of non-cooperative games"
2002	Imre Kertész	Literature	"for writing that upholds the fragile experience of the individual against the barbaric arbitrariness of history"
2004	Avram Hershko	Chemistry	"for the discovery of ubiquitin-mediated protein degradation"
2023	Katalin Karikó	Medicine	"for the development of mRNA-based vaccine"
2023	Ferenc Krausz	Physics	"for experimental methods that generate attosecond pulses of light for the study of electron dynamics in matter"

== Hungarian Scientific Olympic Achievements ==
Hungary has excelled at the scientific Olympiads, ever since the beginnings. Best result is in maths with absolute cumulative 4th place until 2019, behind China, Russia and US. Per capita result is a world leader. Results in physics is just somewhat weaker. 9th place (3rd best in Europe). Per capita result is also a world leader. Chemistry (1968–2019) results give 8th place and 4th place in Europe. This is also a world leader per capita. However the results have weakened lately.

== Hungarian inventions ==
Rubik's Cube

- The English word "coach" came from the Hungarian kocsi ("wagon from Kocs" referring to the village in Hungary where coaches were first made).
- Wolfgang von Kempelen invented a manually operated speaking machine in 1769.
- János Irinyi invented the noiseless match.
- In 1827, Ányos Jedlik invented an early electric motor. He created the first device to contain the three main components of practical direct current motors: the stator, rotor and commutator. He built the first generator which used, instead of permanent magnets, two electromagnets opposite to each other to induce the magnetic field around the rotor.[1][2] This was also the discovery of the principle of "dynamo self-excitation".
- David Schwarz invented and designed the first flyable rigid airship (aluminium-made). Later, he sold his patent to German Graf Zeppelin, who built the so-called Zeppelin airship.
- Donát Bánki and János Csonka invented the carburetor.
- Ottó Bláthy, Miksa Déri and Károly Zipernowsky invented the modern transformer in 1885.
- Ottó Bláthy invented the turbogenerator and wattmeter.
- Kálmán Kandó invented the three-phase alternating current electric locomotive, and was a pioneer in the development of electric railway traction.
- Tivadar Puskás invented the telephone exchange, Telefon Hírmondó.
- Dezső Korda invented the rotating capacitor (tuning capacitor).
- József Galamb was the main engineer and inventor of the Ford Model T and co-developer of the assembly line.
- Eugene Farkas was main engineer on the Fordson tractor.
- Sándor Just invented the tungsten electric bulb (1904).
- Imre Bródy invented the krypton electric bulb.
- Loránd Eötvös: weak equivalence principle and surface tension.
- Sándor Gaál invented the cyclotrone 1929 (but the German editorial, registered 5th of may, mistook it, and did not publish the study)
- Kálmán Tihanyi invented and described the "charge-storage" physical phenomenon, was a pioneer in developing the electronic television and camera-tube (1926), and invented the plasma TV (1936) and infrared camera (1929).
- István Juhász Gamma-Juhász predictor (electro-mechanical "computer") 1930 used for directing artillery.
- Jenö Dulovits 1st mirror-reflex-camera:Duflex
- József Mihályi (Chief-designer at Kodak) was co-designer or designer and inventor for Kodak of the following cameras: Kodak Ekstra, Kodak Medalist, Kodak Super Six-20 and Kodak Bantam Special.
- Ödön Riszdorfer and 0Mihályi invented the first semi-automatic camera: Kodak Super Six-20
- Ödön Riszdorfer light meter (1931)
- Béla Barényi designed the Volkswagen Beetle and is the father of passive safety in automobiles.
- Ervin Kováts invented the concept of Kovats retention index, a concept used in gas chromatography.
- Csaba Horváth constructed the first high performance liquid chromatograph.
- Ferenc Anisits invented the modern diesel engine.
- Albert Szent-Györgyi discovered Vitamin C and created the first artificial vitamin. (Nobel Prize in Physiology or Medicine in 1937)
- Theodore Kármán – Mathematical tools to study fluid flow and mathematical background of supersonic flight and inventor of swept-back wings, "father of Supersonic Flight".
- Albert Fonó – A pioneer of jet propulsion and first to recognize the potential of ramjet propulsion for supersonic flight.
- György Jendrassik invented turboprop propulsion.
- Leó Szilárd hypothesized the nuclear chain reaction invented and patented the atomic bomb (1934), co-patented the nuclear reactor, invented the electron microscope and the linear accelerator (the first particle accelerator), and later invented the cyclotron.
- Tamás Péter Bródy invented the active-matrix thin film transistor technology which underpins the LCD and OLED displays commonly used today.
- Dennis Gabor invented holography (Nobel Prize in Physics in 1971).
- László Bíró invented the ballpoint pen.
- Edward Teller hypothesized thermonuclear fusion and the theory of the hydrogen bomb.
- John Kemeny developed the BASIC programming language with Thomas E. Kurtz.
- Ferenc Pavlics was one of two co-developers of the NASA Apollo Lunar Roving Vehicle.
- Antal K. Bejczy developed Mars Rover Sojourner.
- Ernő Rubik invented the so-called Rubik's Cube.
- ArchiCAD 3-D software was developed by Gábor Bojár (1987).
- Charles Simonyi was chief-architect at Microsoft and oversaw the creation of Microsoft's flagship Office suite of applications.
- Gömböc, a new geometrical body, was invented in 2006 by Hungarian scientists Gábor Domokos and Péter Várkonyi.
- Endre Mester invented low level laser therapy, also known as "light therapy".
- Prezi, a web-based presentation application and storytelling tool, developed by Adam Somlai-Fischer and Peter Halacsy in 2007.
- Áron Losonczy invented the LiTraCon, a translucent concrete building material.
- Dániel Rátai invented the three-dimensional monitor: Leonar3Do.
- The three-dimensional scanner microscope 3D Alba (international patent in 2007) was developed by Katona Gergely and Rózsa Balázs.

In August 1939, Szilárd approached his old friend and collaborator Albert Einstein and convinced him to sign the Einstein–Szilárd letter, lending the weight of Einstein's fame to the proposal. The letter led directly to the establishment of research into nuclear fission by the U.S. government and ultimately to the creation of the Manhattan Project. (Szilárd, with Enrico Fermi, patented the nuclear reactor).

== Science ==
=== Scientists and inventors ===
Important names in the 18th century are Maximilian Hell (astronomer), János Sajnovics (linguist), Matthias Bel (polyhistor), Sámuel Mikoviny (engineer) and Wolfgang von Kempelen (polyhistor and co-founder of comparative linguistics). Physicist and engineer Ányos Jedlik invented the first electric motor (1828), the dynamo, self-excitation, the impulse generator, and the cascade connection of capacitors. An important name in 19th-century physics is Joseph Petzval, one of the founders of modern optics. The invention of the transformer (by Ottó Bláthy, Miksa Déri and Károly Zipernowsky), the AC electricity meter, and electricity distribution systems with parallel-connected power sources decided the future of electrification in the war of the currents, which resulted in the global triumph of alternating current systems over the earlier direct current systems. Roland von Eötvös discovered the weak equivalence principle (one of the cornerstones in Einsteinian relativity). Radó von Kövesligethy discovered laws of black-body radiation before Planck and Wien.

=== Mathematicians ===
Hungary is famous for its excellent mathematics education, which has trained numerous outstanding scientists. Famous Hungarian mathematicians include father Farkas Bolyai and son János Bolyai, designer of modern geometry (non-Euclidean geometry) 1820–1823. Together with John von Neumann, János Bolyai is considered to be the greatest Hungarian mathematician ever. The most prestigious Hungarian scientific award is named in honor of János Bolyai. John von Neumann was a pioneer in quantum theory, game theory and digital computing, and he was the key mathematician on the Manhattan Project. Mathematician Paul Erdős is famed for publishing in over forty languages, and his Erdős numbers are still tracked.

Many Hungarian scientists, including Zoltán Bay, Victor Szebehely (practical solution to the three-body problem; Newton the two-body problem), Mária Telkes, Imre Izsak, Louis W. Parker, Erdős, von Neumann, Leó Szilárd, Eugene Wigner, Theodore von Kármán and Edward Teller, emigrated to the United States and made valuable contributions there. (Some Hungarian scientists went to Germany instead: engineer/scientist István Szabó (1906–1980), for example. (Some went to Soviet Union:Robert Bartini). István Juhász, inventor of one of the earliest electro-mechanical computers, Gamma-Juhász, stayed at home and was ostracized) An influential cause of scientist emigration was the 1920 Treaty of Trianon after World War I, by which Hungary, diminished by the treaty, became unable to support large-scale, costly scientific research. At least fifteen (15–20) Hungarian or Hungarian-born scientists received the Nobel Prize: von Lenárd, Bárány, Zsigmondy, von Szent-Györgyi, de Hevesy, von Békésy, Wigner, Gábor, Polányi, Oláh, Harsányi, Herskó and in 2023: Katalin Karikó and Ferenc Krausz. Most of them had emigrated, mostly because of persecution by communist and/or fascist regimes. A significant group of Hungarian dissident scientists of Jewish descent who settled in the United States in the first half of the 20th century were called The Martians.

Béla Gáspár patented the first one-strip fullcolor film: Gasparcolor. Names in psychology are János Selye founder of Stress-theory and Csikszentmihalyi founder of Flow- theory. Tamás Roska is co-inventor of CNN (cellular neural network).

Some internationally well-known figures of today include: mathematician László Lovász, physicist Albert-László Barabási, physicist Ferenc Krausz, chemist Julius Rebek, chemist Árpád Furka, biochemist Árpád Pusztai and the highly controversial former NASA-physicist Ferenc Miskolczi, who denies the green-house effect. According to Science Watch: In Hadron research Hungary has most citations per paper in the world. In 2011 neuroscientists György Buzsáki, Tamás Freund and Peter Somogyi were awarded with The Brain Prize ("Danish Nobel Prize" in neurology)" for "brain circuits involved in memory". Péter Horváth, in Szeged, is a biophysicist, explaining minimal changes in a cell.

After the fall of the communist dictatorship (1989), a new scientific prize, the János Bolyai Creative Award (Bolyai János alkotói díj), was established (1997), politically unbiased and of the highest international standard. Tibor Gánti got full recognition first after his death for his Chemoton-theory which explains how life started.

== Winners of notable awards since 2000 ==
Year	Awardee	Award	Notes
2001	Mathematician László Lovász	Gödel Prize	
2001	Chemist Gabor A. Somorjai	National Medal of Science (US)	11th Hungarian- 1st Theodore von Kármán (1962), 2nd Eugene Wigner (68), 3rd Edward Teller (84)
2002	Chemist Julius Rebek	Chemical Pioneer Award	1st Hungarian awardee
2002	Physicist Ferenc Krausz	Wittgenstein Prize	
2004	Chemist Zoltan Nusser	Lieben Prize	1st Hungarian awardee since 2004
2004	Chemist Avram Hershko	Nobel Prize in Chemistry	7th Hungarian awardee
2005	Mathematician Peter Lax (US)	Abel Prize	1st Hungarian awardee
2006	Mathematician László Lovász	John von Neumann Theory Prize	
2006/7	Chemist George Feher	Wolf Prize	(US) born in Czechoslovakia
2008	Mathematician Albert-László Barabási	C&C Prize	
2008	Physicist Rudolf Kálmán	National Medal of Science (US)	11th? Hungarian awardee – 5th Paul Gyorgyi (1975), 6th Peter C. Goldmark (1976), 7th Lax (1986), 8th Bott and 9th Stigler (1987), 10th Friedman (1988)
2009	Physicist Miklos Porkolab	James Clerk Maxwell Prize for Plasma Physics	1st Hungarian
2009	Neuroscientist Peter Somogyi	Feldberg Foundation prize	2nd Hungarian 1st György Radda
2009	Chemist Csaba Pal	Lieben Prize	2nd Hungarian awardee since 2004
2010	Mathematician László Lovász	Kyoto Prize	3rd Hungarian awardee – 1st Rudolf Kálmán, 2nd György Ligeti
2011	Chemist Veronica Vaida	E. Bright Wilson Award in Spectroscopy	
2011	Chemist Julius Rebek	William H. Nichols Medal	1st Hungarian awardee
2011	Neuroscientists György Buzsáki, Peter Somogyi, and Tamas Freund	Inaugural European Brain Research Prize	
2012	Mathematician Endre Szemerédi	Abel Prize	2nd Hungarian awardee
2013	Physicist Miklos Porkolab	Hannes Alfvén Prize	1st Hungarian awardee
2013	Physicist Ferenc Krausz	Otto Hahn Prize	
2013	Mathematician Janos Körner	Claude E. Shannon Award	2nd Hungarian – 1st Imre Cziszár
2019	Mathematician Katalin Marton	Claude E. Shannon Award	3rd Hungarian
2015	Physicist Ferenc Krausz	Thomson Reuters Citation Laureate	
2015	Chemist Gabor A. Somorjai	William H. Nichols Medal	2nd Hungarian
2016	Mathematician Illes Farkas	Lieben Prize	4th Hungarian since 2004
2017	Mathematician János Kollár	Shaw Prize	
2017	Mathematician András Vasy	Bôcher prize	2nd Hungarian awardee – 1st John von Neumann
2018	Mathematician László Székelyhidi⁷	Leibniz Prize	3rd Hungarian – 1st Géza Alföldy
2018	Physicist Örs Legéza	Humboldt Research Award	
2018	Neuroscientist Botond Roska	W. Alden Spencer Award	
2019	Mathematician Albert-László Barabási	EPS Statistical and Nonlinear Physics Prize	
2019	Neuroscientist Botond Roska	Cloëtta Prize	1st Hungarian awardee
2019	Neuroscientist Botond Roska	Louis-Jeantet Prize for Medicine	1st Hungarian awardee
2020	Neuroscientist Botond Roska	Körber European Science Prize	4th Hungarian awardee – 1st Paul Rácz, 2nd Dénes Dudits
2020	Physicist Tamás Vicsek	Lars Onsager Prize	1st Hungarian awardee
2020	Neuroscientist György Buzsáki	Ralph W. Gerard Prize	2nd Hungarian awardee – 1st Stephen William Kuffler
2020	Astrophysicist Norbert Werner	Lieben Prize	5th Hungarian (from Slovakia)
2020	Biochemist Katalin Karikó	Rosenstiel Award	The scientist behind the Pfizer COVID-19 vaccine
2021	Chemist Veronica Vaida	Chemical Pioneer Award	4th Hungarian
2021	Mathematician László Lovász	Abel Prize	3rd hungarian
2021	Physicist Albert-László Barabási	EPS Statistical and Nonlinear Physics Prize	2nd hungarian
2021	Biochemist Katalin Karikó	BBVA Foundation Frontiers of Knowledge Awards gives HUN 1st place/capita	4th hungarian – 1st Gàbor Somorjai, 2nd György Kurtág, 3rd Péter Eötvös
2021	Physicist Ferenc Mezei	Gothenburg Lise Meitner Award	for neutron research e.g. Supermirror, Neutron spin echo
2021	Chemist Edit Mátyus	Dirac Medal (WATOC)	1st hungarian
2021	Physicist Örs Legéza	Hans Fischer Senior Fellowship	
2021	Janos Hajdu (biophysicist)	Gregorii Aminoff Award	1st hungarian
2022	Physicist Ferenc Krausz	Wolf Prize in physics	12 or 13th Hungarian Wolf. (2nd hungarian in physics)
2022	Mathematician George Lusztig	Wolf Prize in mathematics	5th hungarian in mathematics
2022	Biochemist Katalin Karikó	Louis-Jeantet Prize for Medicine	2nd hungarian awardee
2022	Biochemist Katalin Karikó	Lasker Award	3rd hungarian– 1st Szent-Györgyi, 2nd Herskó
2022	Physicist Ferenc Krausz	BBVA Foundation Frontiers of Knowledge Awards	5th hungarian
2023	Mathematician/Physicist Albert-László Barabási	Lilienfeld Prize	2nd hungarian
2023	Biochemist Katalin Karikó	National Inventors Hall of Fame (US) inductee	3rd hungarian woman inductee – after Maria Telkes and Hedy Lamarr
2023	Chemist Gabor A. Somorjai	Enrico Fermi Award	4th hungarian – 1st John von Neumann, 2nd Eugene J. Wigner (58), 3rd Edward Teller (62)
2023	Biochemist Katalin Kariko	Meyenburg Prize	
2023	Biochemist Katalin Kariko	Nobel Prize in Physiology or Medicine	For Groundbreaking Work on mRNA; 1st hungarian woman awardee and 5th hungarian in physiology or medicine.
2023	Physicist Ferenc Krausz	Nobel Prize in Physics	4th(−6th) hungarian in physics category
2023	Chemist Edit Mátyus IAQMSaward	after Peter Pulay 1982	1st hungarian woman 3rd hungarian after Peter Pulay 1982 & Mihály Kállay 2009
2023	Physicist Albert-Laszlo Barabási	Gothenburg Lise Meitner Award	3rd hungarian
2023	Mathematician Éva Tardos	Knuth Prize	5th hungarian 4th László Babai, 3rd Ajtai, 2nd László Lovász, 1st Leslie Valiant
2024	Mathematician József Balogh	Leroy P. Steele Prize for Seminal Contribution to Research	6th hungarian – 1st Halmos, 2nd Rudolf Kálmán, 3rd Raoul Bott, 4th Peter Lax, 5th Endre Szemeredi
2024	Neuroscientist Botond Roska	Wolf Prize	14th or 15th Hungarian, with György Kurtág
2024	Physicist Tünde Fülöp	Hannes Alfvén Prize	2nd hungarian , 1st: Miklos Porkolab
2024	Chemist Edit Mátyus	Lieben Prize	1st hungarian woman & 6th hungarian
2025	Mathematician László Lovász	Erasmus medal	
2026	Albert-László Barabási	Euler Award	

===Winners of notable awards since 2026===

Year	Awardee	Award	Notes
2026	Mathematician László Lovász	Helmholtz Medal	4th hungarian
2026	Neuroscientist Botond Roska	Perl-UNC Prize	1st hungarian
2026	Albert-László Barabási	Euler Award	
2026	Neuroscientist György Bence	Alfred Vogt Prize	2nd hungarian
2026	Neuroscientist Botond Roska	António Champalimaud Vision Award	
2026	Miklós Tegze, Gábor Bortel & Gyula Faigel	Gregori Aminoff Prize	2nd time

== Technology ==
=== Early milestones in technology and infrastructure (1700–1918) ===
The first steam engines of continental Europe was built in Újbánya – Köngisberg, Kingdom of Hungary (Today Nová Baňa Slovakia) in 1722. These were similar to the Newcomen engines, they served on pumping water from mines.

==== Railways ====
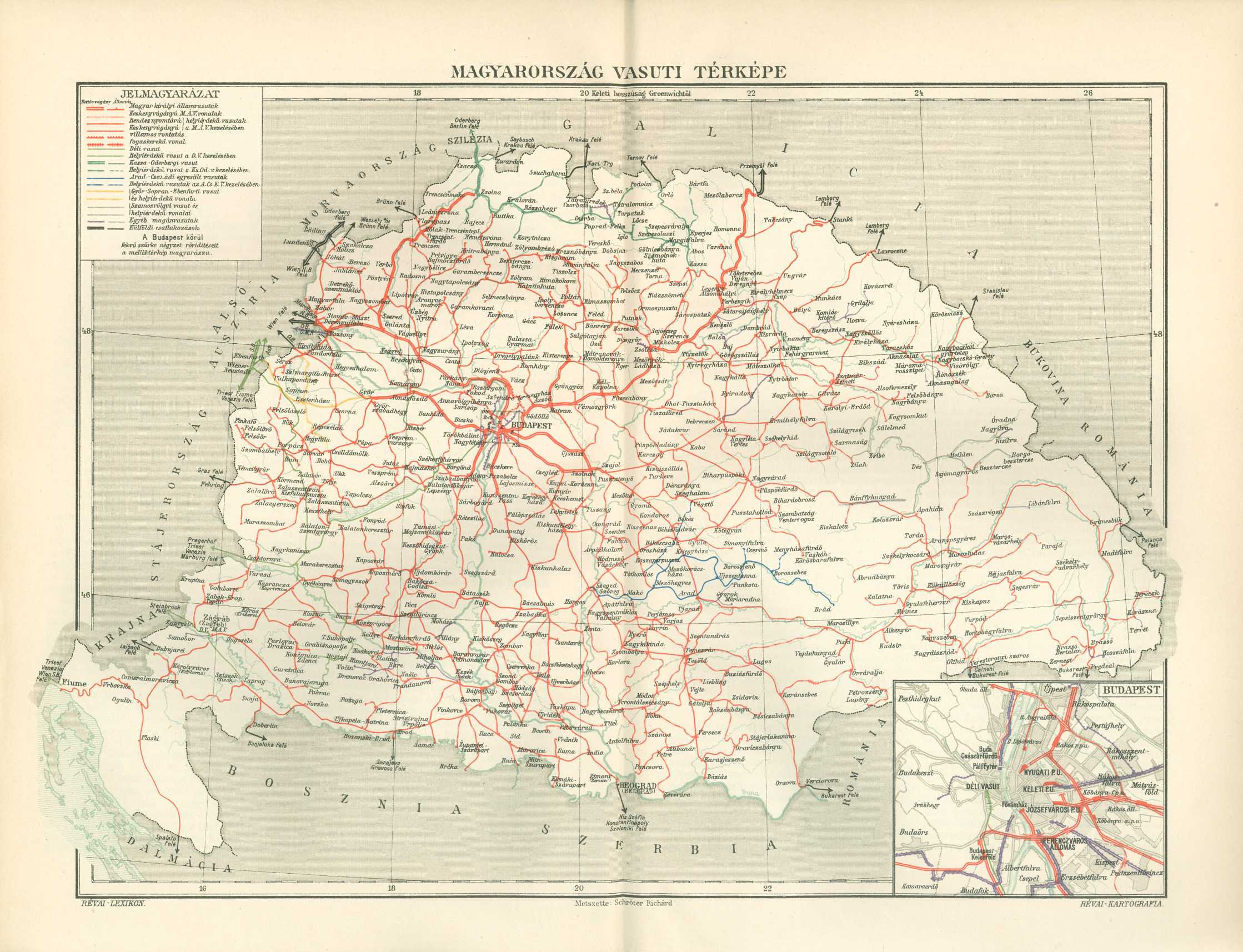
Railway network of Kingdom of Hungary in the 1910s. Red lines represents the Hungarian State Railways, blue, green and yellow lines were owned by private companies in Hungary

The first Hungarian steam-locomotive railway line was opened on 15 July 1846, between Pest and Vác. By 1910, the total length of the rail networks of the Hungarian Kingdom had reached 22,869 km (14,210 mi); the Hungarian network linked more than 1,490 settlements. This has ranked Hungarian railways as the sixth-most dense in the world (ahead of countries as Germany or France).

Locomotive engine and railway vehicle manufacturers before World War One (engines and wagons, bridge and iron structures) were the MÁVAG company in Budapest (steam engines and wagons) and the Ganz company in Budapest (steam engines, wagons, the production of electric locomotives and electric trams started from 1894). and the RÁBA Company in Győr.

The Ganz Works identified the significance of induction motors and synchronous motors commissioned Kálmán Kandó (1869–1931) to develop it. In 1894, Kálmán Kandó developed high-voltage three-phase AC motors and generators for electric locomotives. The first-ever electric rail vehicle manufactured by Ganz Works was a 6 HP pit locomotive with direct current traction system. The first Ganz made asynchronous rail vehicles (altogether 2 pieces) were supplied in 1898 to Évian-les-Bains (Switzerland), with a 37-horsepower (28 kW), asynchronous-traction system. The Ganz Works won the tender of electrification of railway of Valtellina Railways in Italy in 1897. Italian railways were the first in the world to introduce electric traction for the entire length of a main line, rather than just a short stretch. The 106-kilometre (66 mi) Valtellina line was opened on 4 September 1902, designed by Kandó and a team from the Ganz works. The electrical system was three-phase at 3 kV 15 Hz. The voltage was significantly higher than used earlier, and it required new designs for electric motors and switching devices. In 1918, Kandó invented and developed the rotary phase converter, enabling electric locomotives to use three-phase motors whilst supplied via a single overhead wire, carrying the simple industrial frequency (50 Hz) single phase AC of the high voltage national networks.

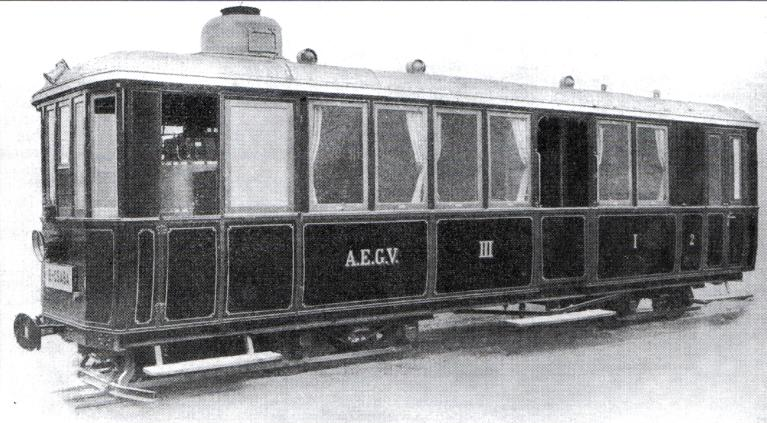
The first steam railcar built by Ganz and de Dion-Bouton

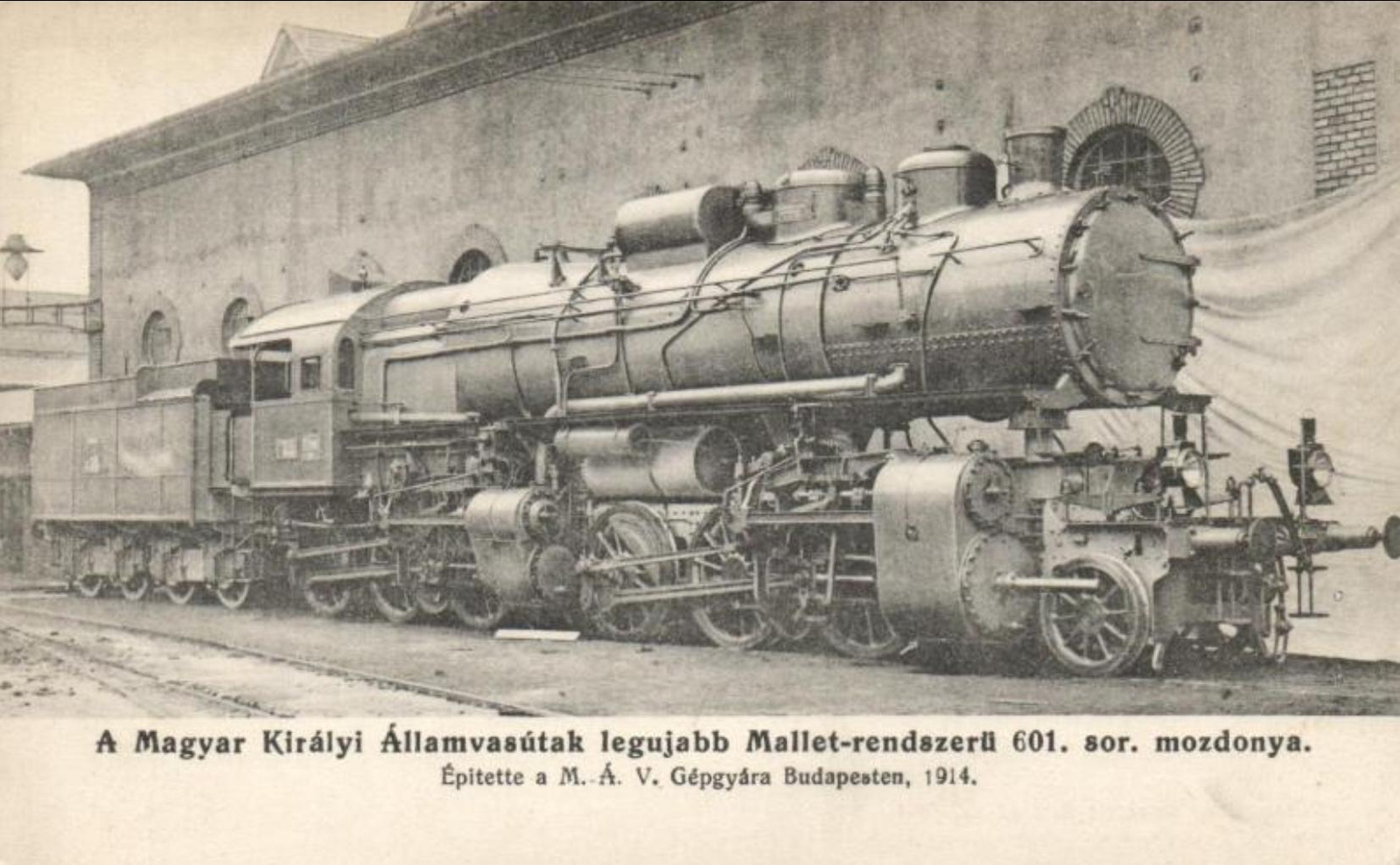
The four-cylinder 2,950 hp (2,200 kW) MÁV Class 601 was the strongest steam locomotive of pre WW1 Europe.

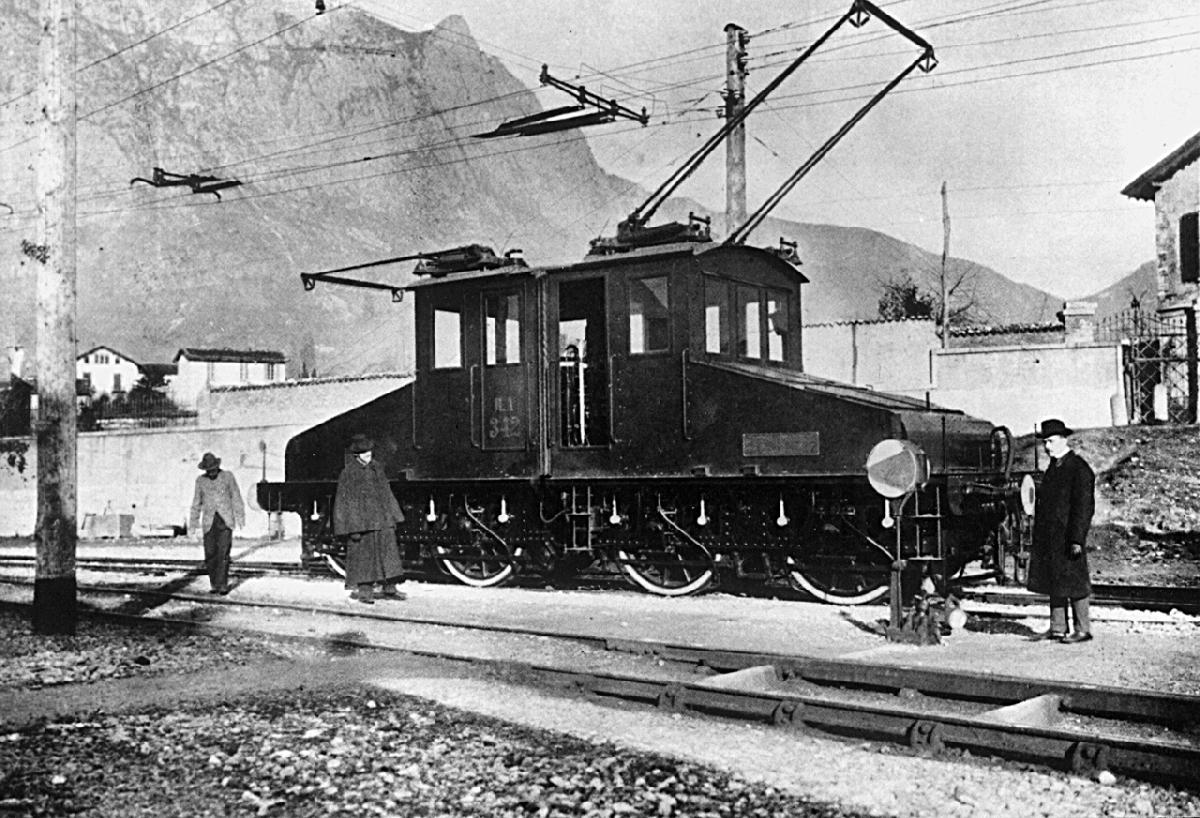
Ganz AC electric locomotive prototype (1901 Valtellina, Italy)

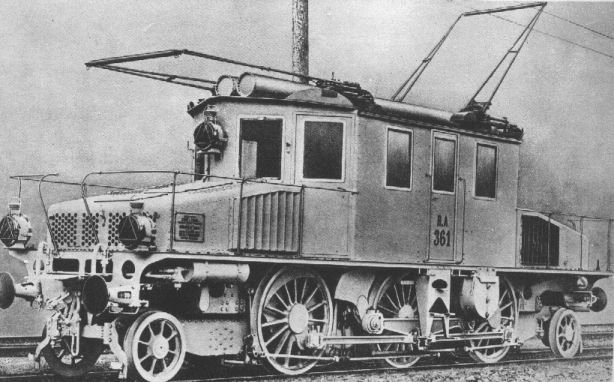
Electric locomotive RA 361 (later FS Class E.360) by Ganz for the Valtellina line, 1904

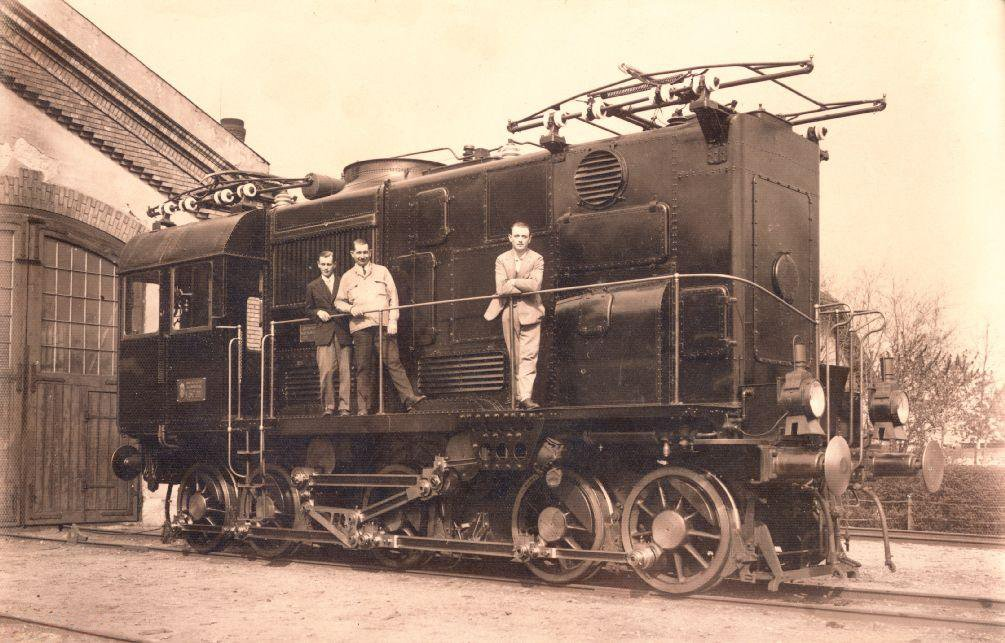
The world's first locomotive with a phase converter was Kandó's V50 locomotive (only for demonstration and testing purposes)

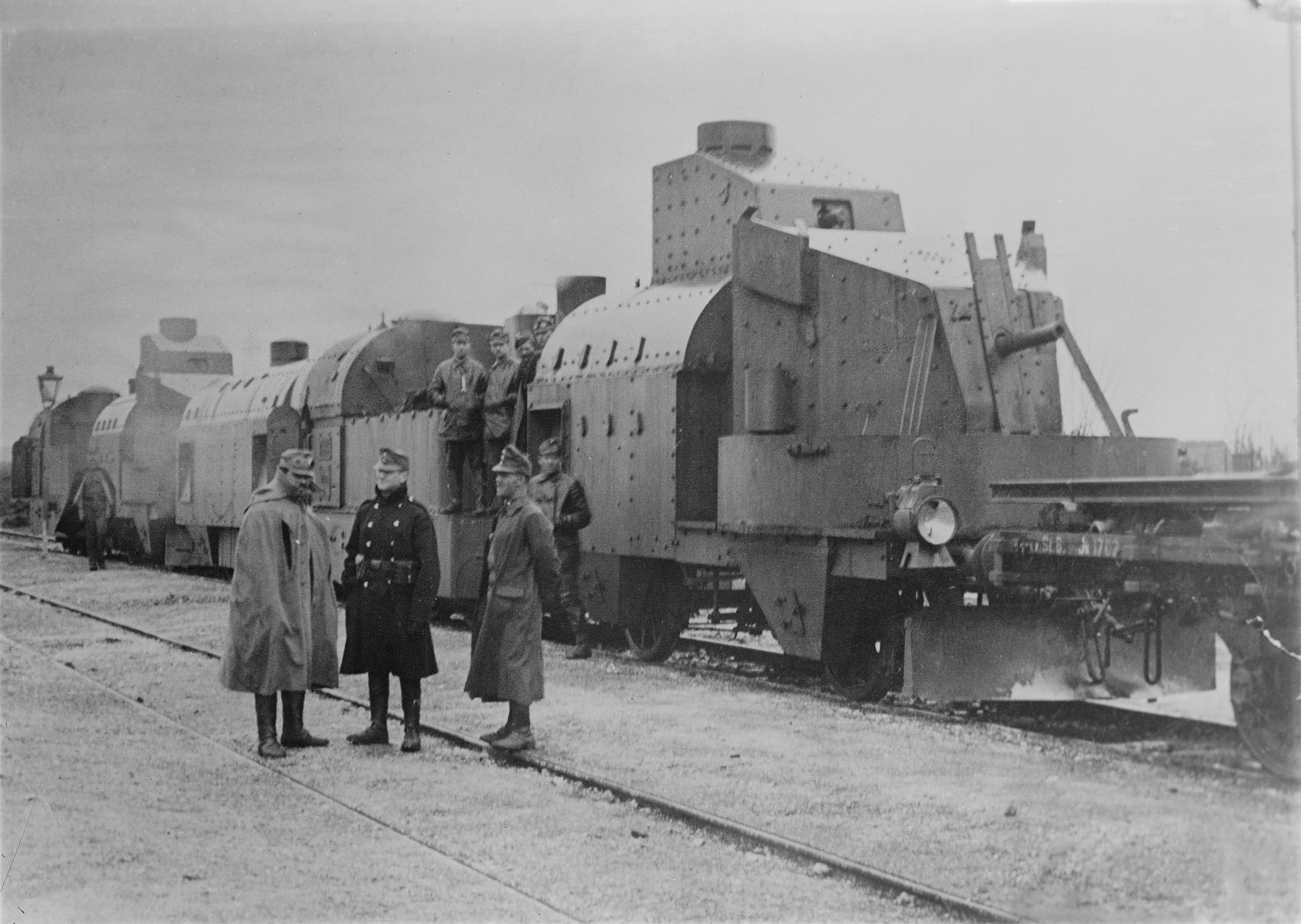
MÁV armoured train during the WW I

==== Electrified railway lines ====
- Budapest (See: BHÉV): Ráckeve line (1887), Szentendre line (1888), Gödöllő line (1888), Csepel line (1912)

==== Electrified tramways ====
The first electric tramway was built in Budapest in 1887, which was the first tramway in Austria-Hungary. By the turn of the 20th century, 22 Hungarian cities had electrified tramway lines in Kingdom of Hungary.

Date of electrification of tramway lines in the Kingdom of Hungary:

- Hungary: Budapest (1887); Pressburg/Pozsony/Bratislava (1895); Szabadka/Subotica, Szombathely, Miskolc (1897); Temesvár/Timișoara (1899); Sopron (1900); Szatmárnémeti/Satu Mare (1900); Nyíregyháza (1905); Nagyszeben/Sibiu (1905); Nagyvárad/Oradea (1906); Szeged (1908); Debrecen (1911); Újvidék/Novi Sad (1911); Kassa/Košice (1913); Pécs (1913)
- Croatia: Fiume (1899); Pula (1904); Opatija – Lovran (1908); Zagreb (1910); Dubrovnik (1910).

==== Underground ====
The Budapest metro Line 1 (originally the "Franz Joseph Underground Electric Railway Company") is the second oldest underground railway in the world (the first being the London Underground's Metropolitan Line), and the first on the European mainland. It was built from 1894 to 1896 and opened in Budapest on 2 May 1896. Since 2002, the M1 line was listed as a UNESCO World Heritage Site. The M1 line became an IEEE Milestone due to the radically new innovations in its era: "Among the railway's innovative elements were bidirectional tram cars; electric lighting in the subway stations and tram cars; and an overhead wire structure instead of a third-rail system for power."

==== Automotive industry ====
The spread of the Industrial Revolution in Hungary, along with the technological changes brought about by progress, made it clear by the end of the 19th century that the end of horse-drawn transport was approaching. Around 1818, Farkas Bolyai and Péter Bodor presented their steam carriage in Marosvásárhely, in 1819, József Horti-Horváth showcased the flywheel omnibus, Ányos Jedlik stirred the interest with his electric-powered vehicle model and carriage. Developments continued in the latter half of the century: in 1876, György Wessely received a patent for a self-propelled steam carriage, and Ferenc Preiner also demonstrated a steam-powered carriage. By 1890, Ferenc Korda had created the first battery-operated electric car in Hungary. János Csonka had a significant impact on further development in the industrial sector of petrol engines; in addition to inventing the carburetor, he designed a petrol engine driven mail collection car for the Hungarian Post. The vehicle was manufactured by the Ganz company and was put into circulation in November 1900.

---

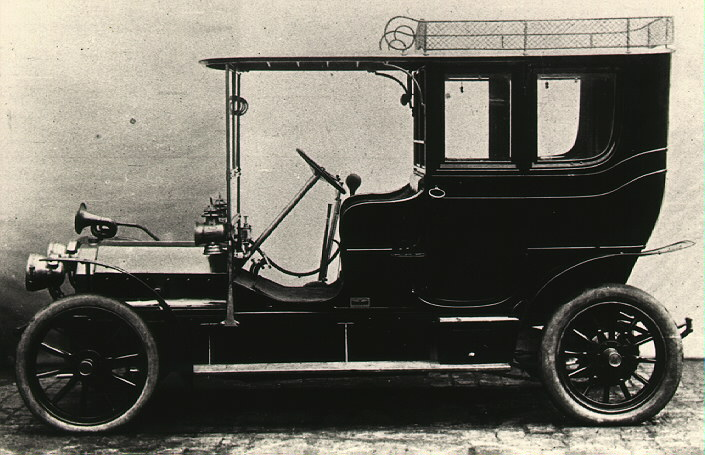
Magomobil phoenix car -1906

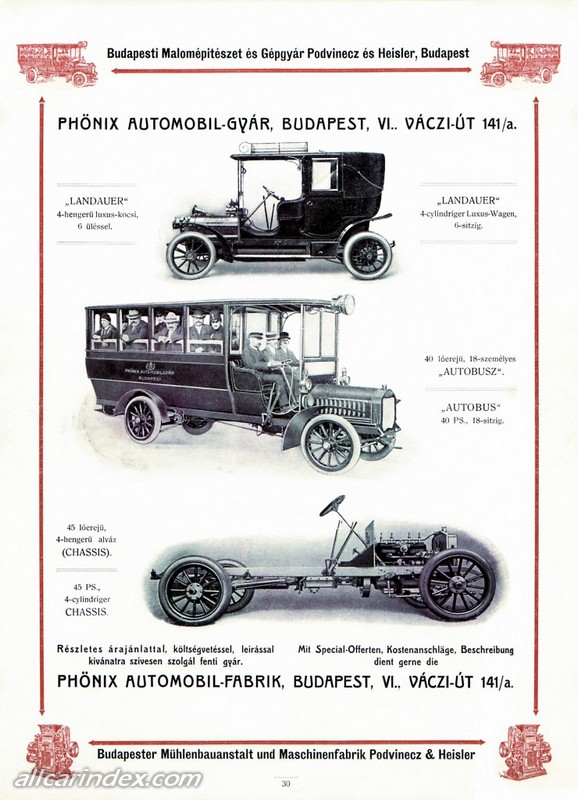
A Magomobil Phoenix advertisement in 1911

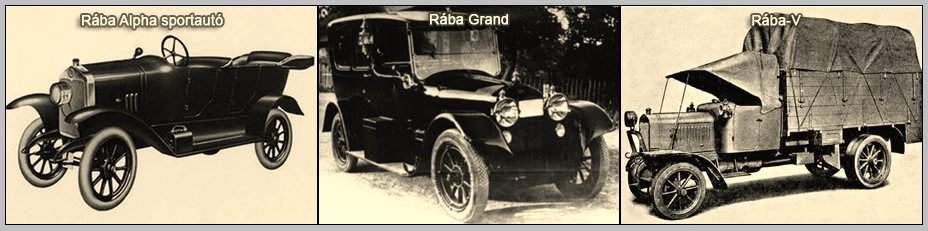
Rába (automobile)

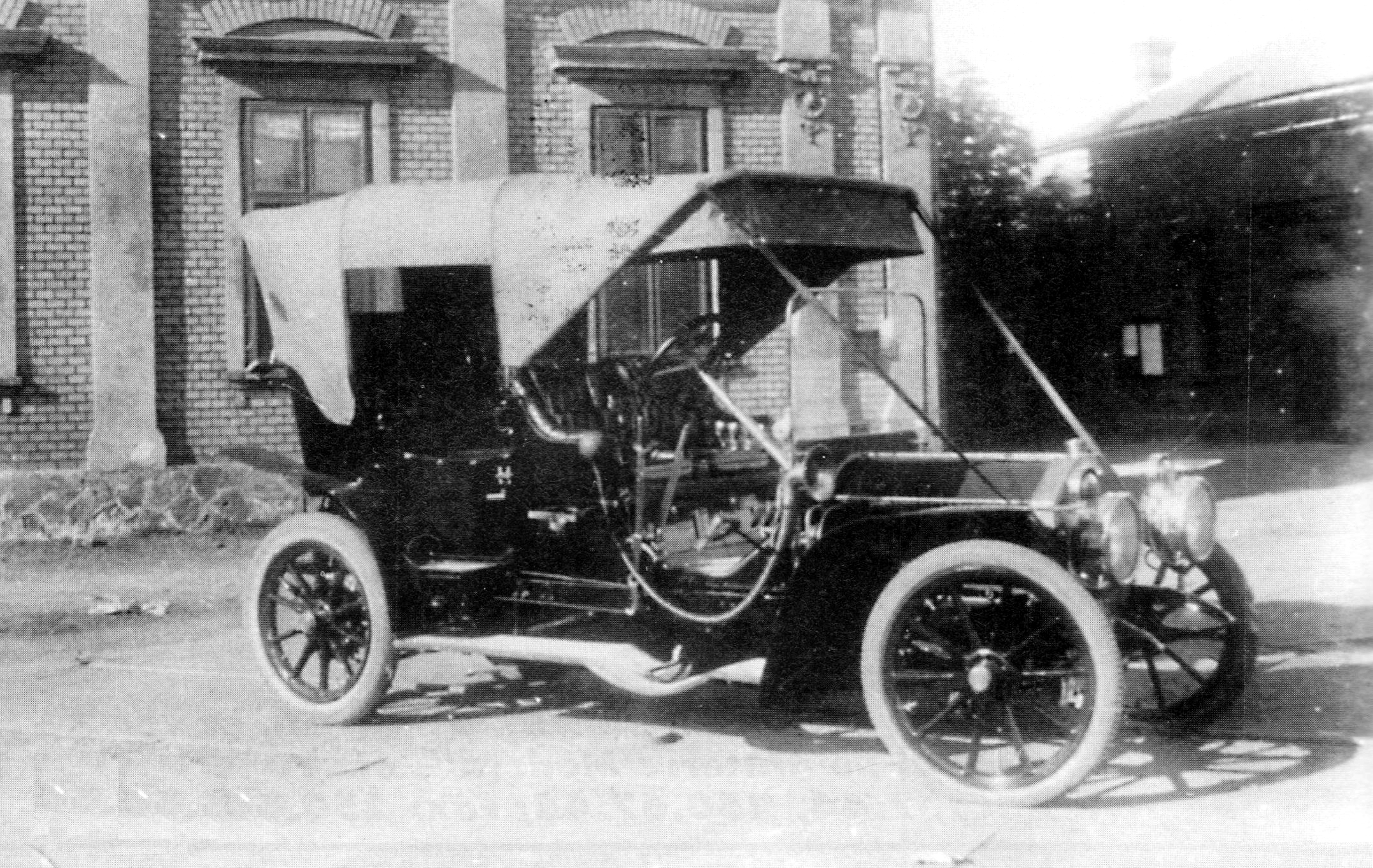
MARTA 35-45 HP Dublu-Phaeton

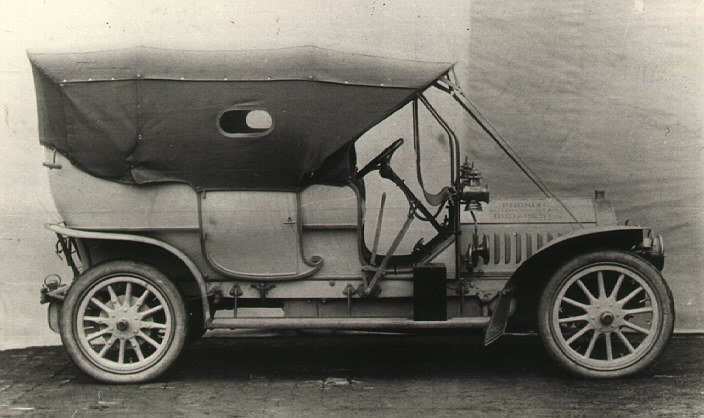
Magomobil phönix auto -1910

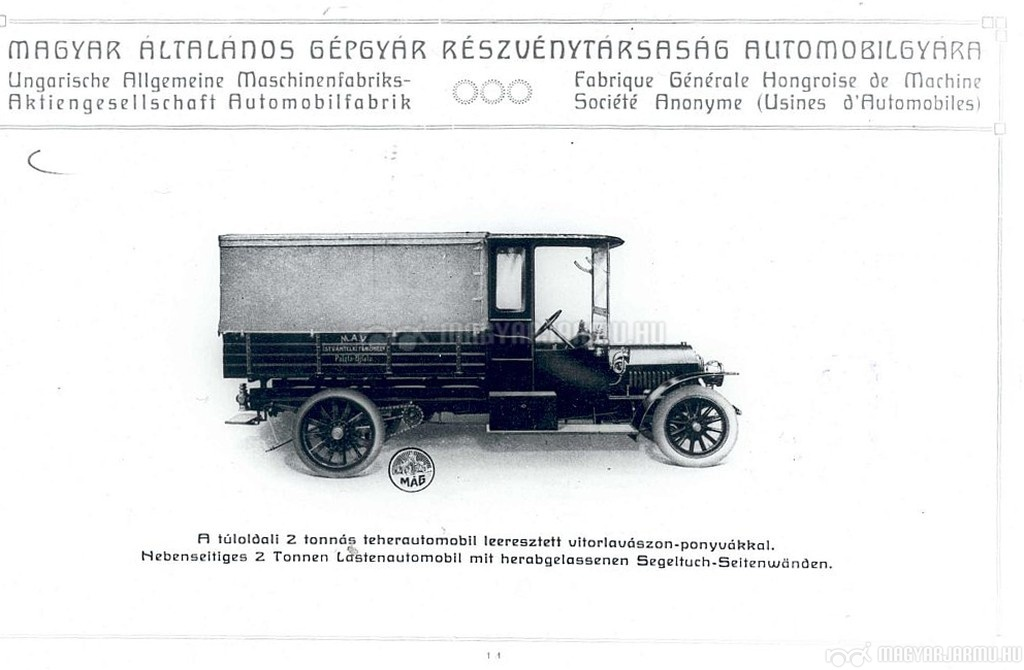
A Magomobil truck in 1914

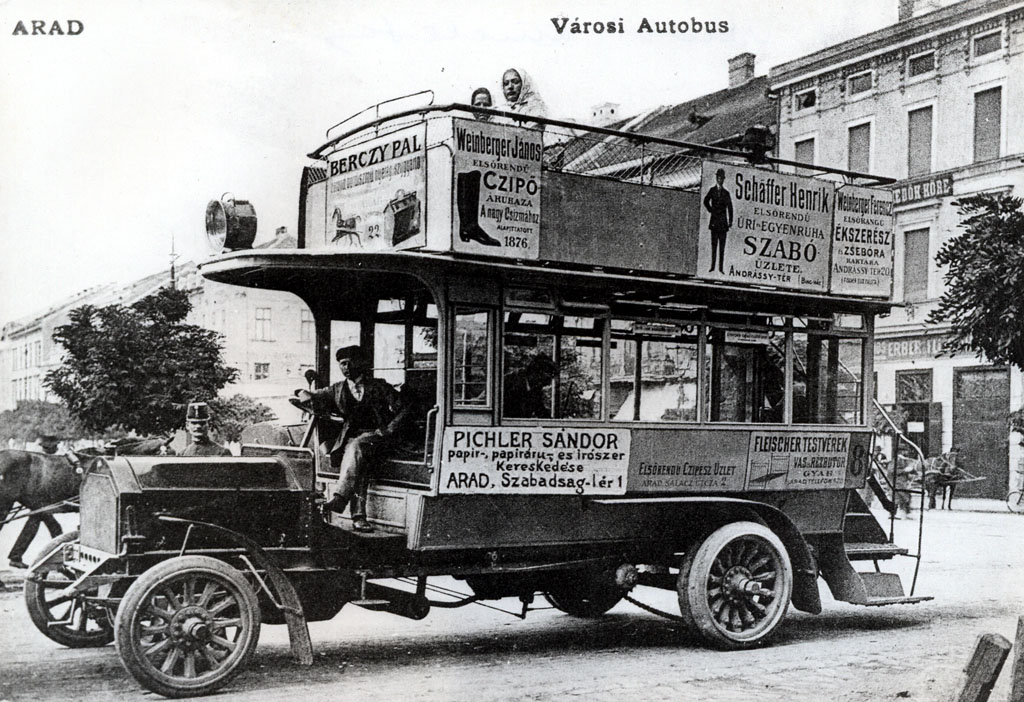
Marta bus in Arad in 1909

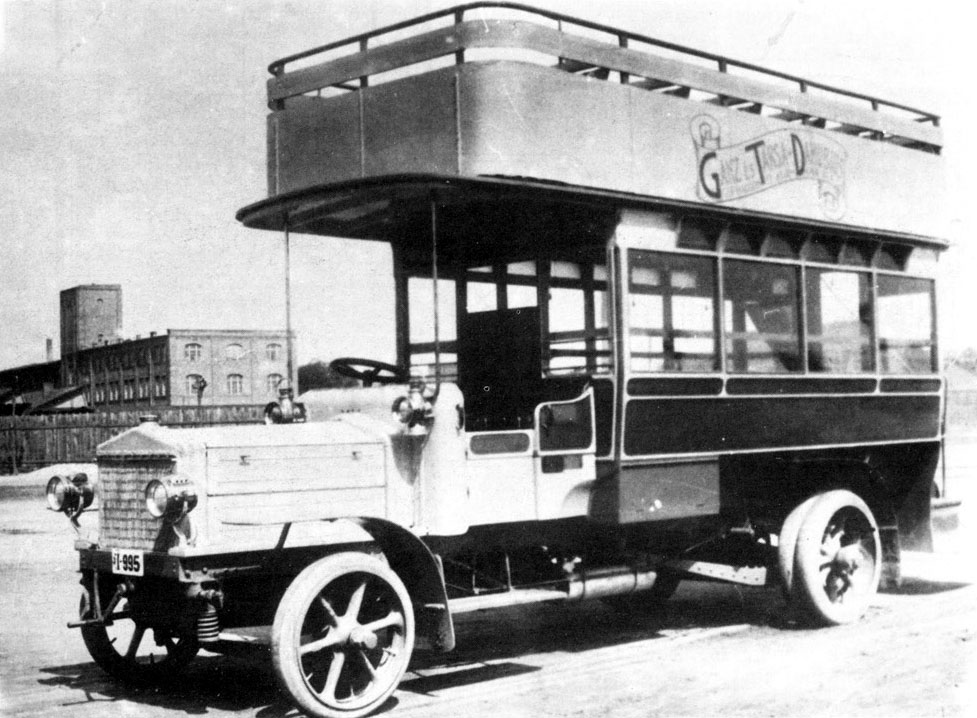
Photograph of a Ganz bus in 1914

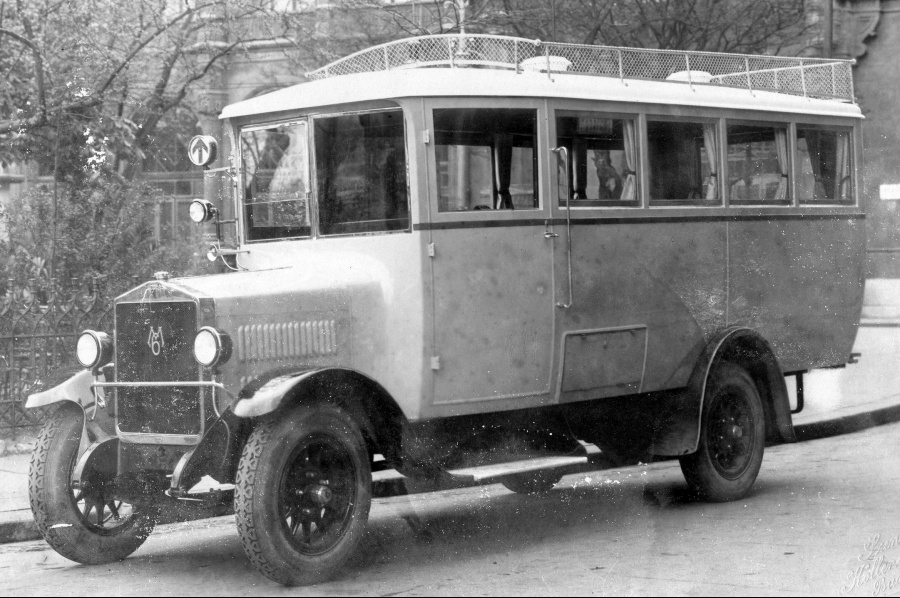
Magomobil bus in Budapest in 1913

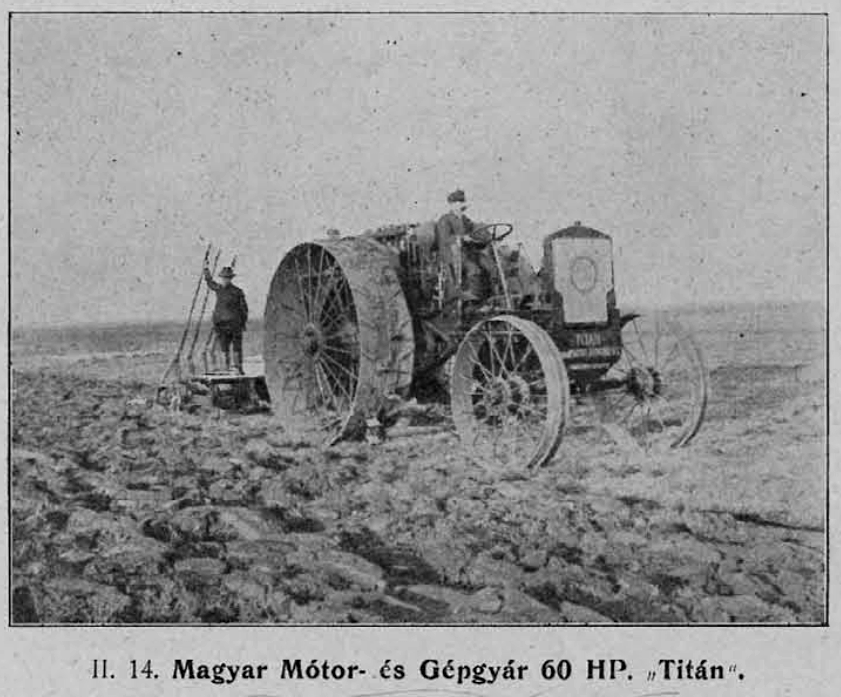
"Titan" petrol engine tractor in 1913. (Produced by the Magyar Motor és Gépgyár)

Prior to World War I, the Kingdom of Hungary had four car manufacturer companies; Hungarian car production started in 1900. Automotive factories in the Kingdom of Hungary manufactured motorcycles, cars, taxicabs, trucks and buses. These were: the Ganz company in Budapest, RÁBA Automobile in Győr, MÁG (later Magomobil) in Budapest, and MARTA (Hungarian Automobile Joint-stock Company Arad) in Arad.

=== Aeronautical industry ===
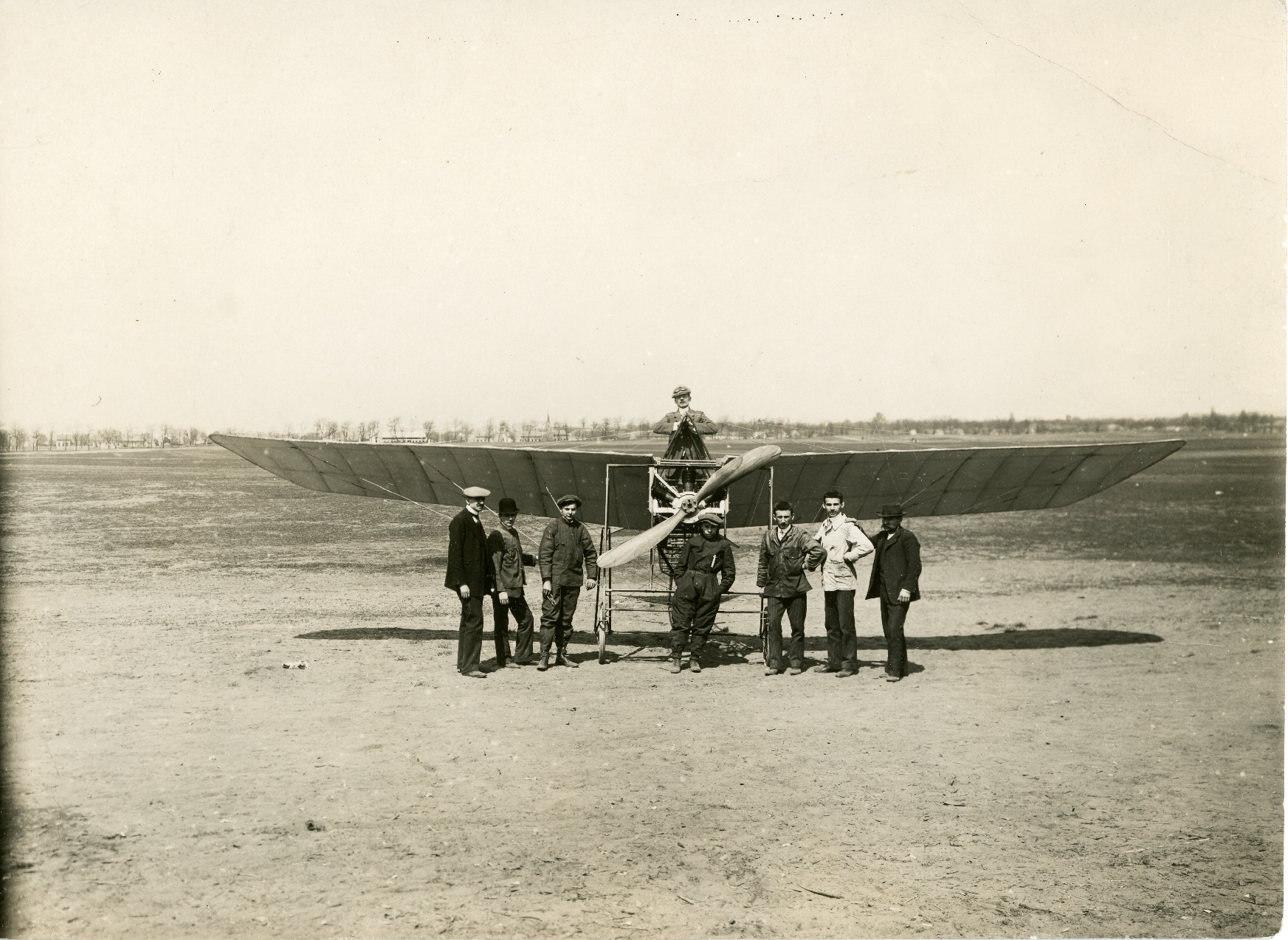
The first Hungarian airplane with Hungarian designed aeroengine. December 9, 1909

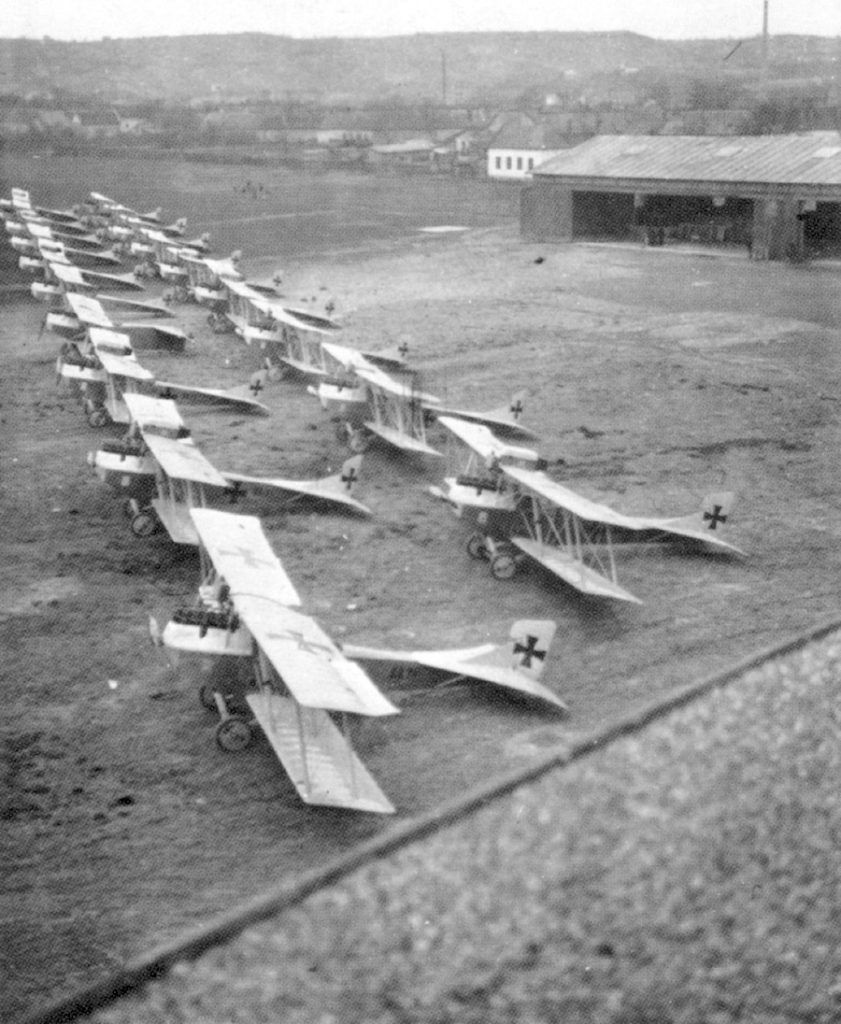
UFAG Brandenburg C.I aircraft in Albertfalva (Budapest ) in 1916

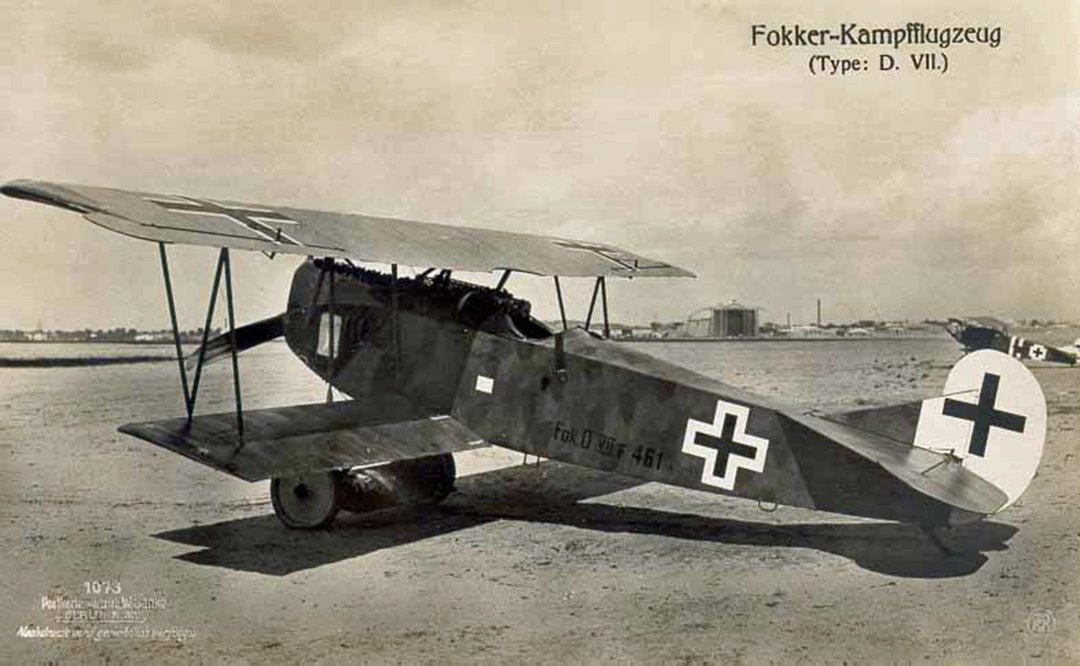
Hungarian produced Fokker fighter plane

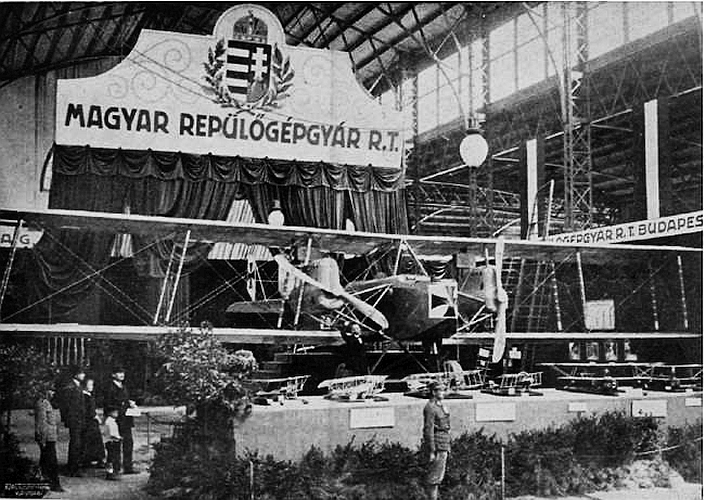
Twin engine heavy bomber, produced by the Hungarian Airplane Factory, joint-stock company (1917).

The first Hungarian hydrogen-filled experimental balloons were built by István Szabik and József Domin in 1784. The first Hungarian-designed and produced airplane to be powered by a Hungarian aero engine was flown in 1909 at Rákosmező. The International Air-race was organized in Budapest, Rákosmező in June 1910. The earliest Hungarian radial engine powered airplane was built in 1913. Between 1913 and 1918, the Hungarian aircraft industry began developing. The three mist significant were UFAG Hungarian Aircraft Factory (1912), Hungarian General Aircraft Factory (1916) and the Hungarian Lloyd Aircraft engine factory (at Aszód (1916), and Marta in Arad (1914). During the WW I, fighter planes, bombers and reconnaissance planes were produced in these factories. The most important aero engine factories of the period were Weiss Manfred Works, Ganz Works, and Hungarian Automobile Joint-stock Company Arad.

During the interwar and WWII periods, Hungarian designs continued to be developed and flown, however for the most part German types were modified and/or manufactured under license. Examples include those developed or manufactured by Weiss Manfred and the RMI (Repülo Muszaki Intézet, or Aviation Technical Institute).

=== Electrical industry and electronics ===
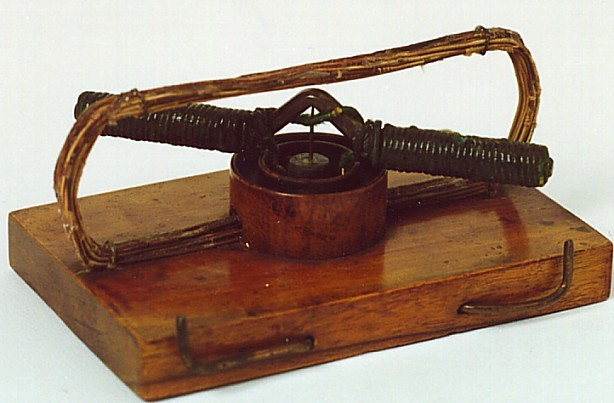
Jedlik motor 1827

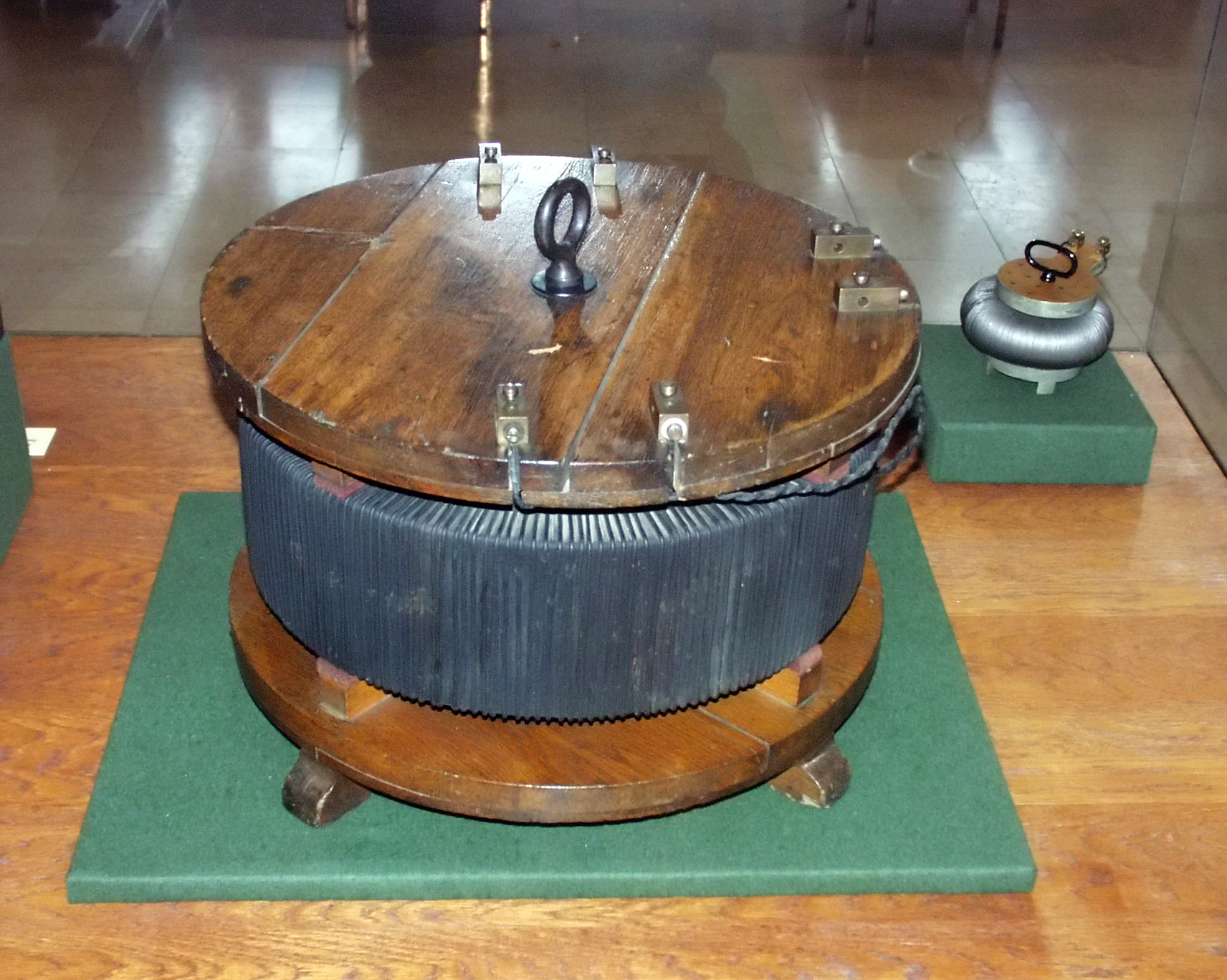
The ZBD Transformer of GANZ Works, 1885

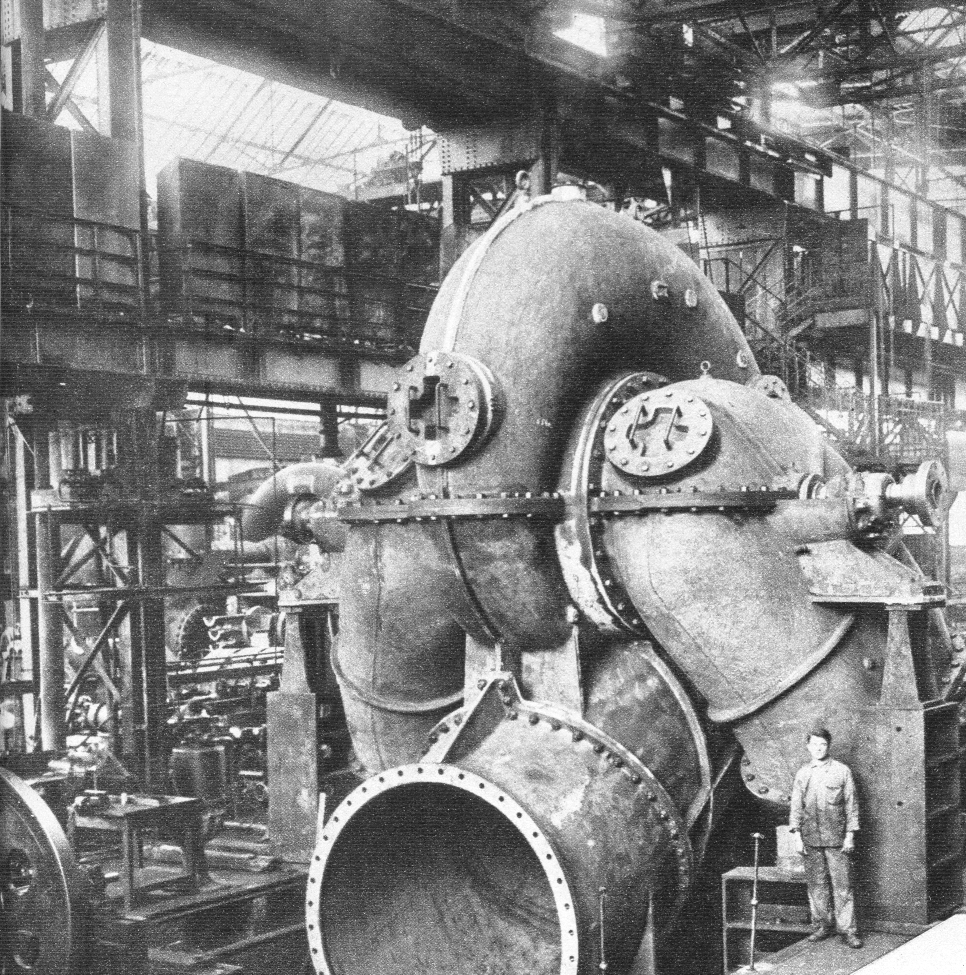
construction of a Ganz water turbo generator (1886)

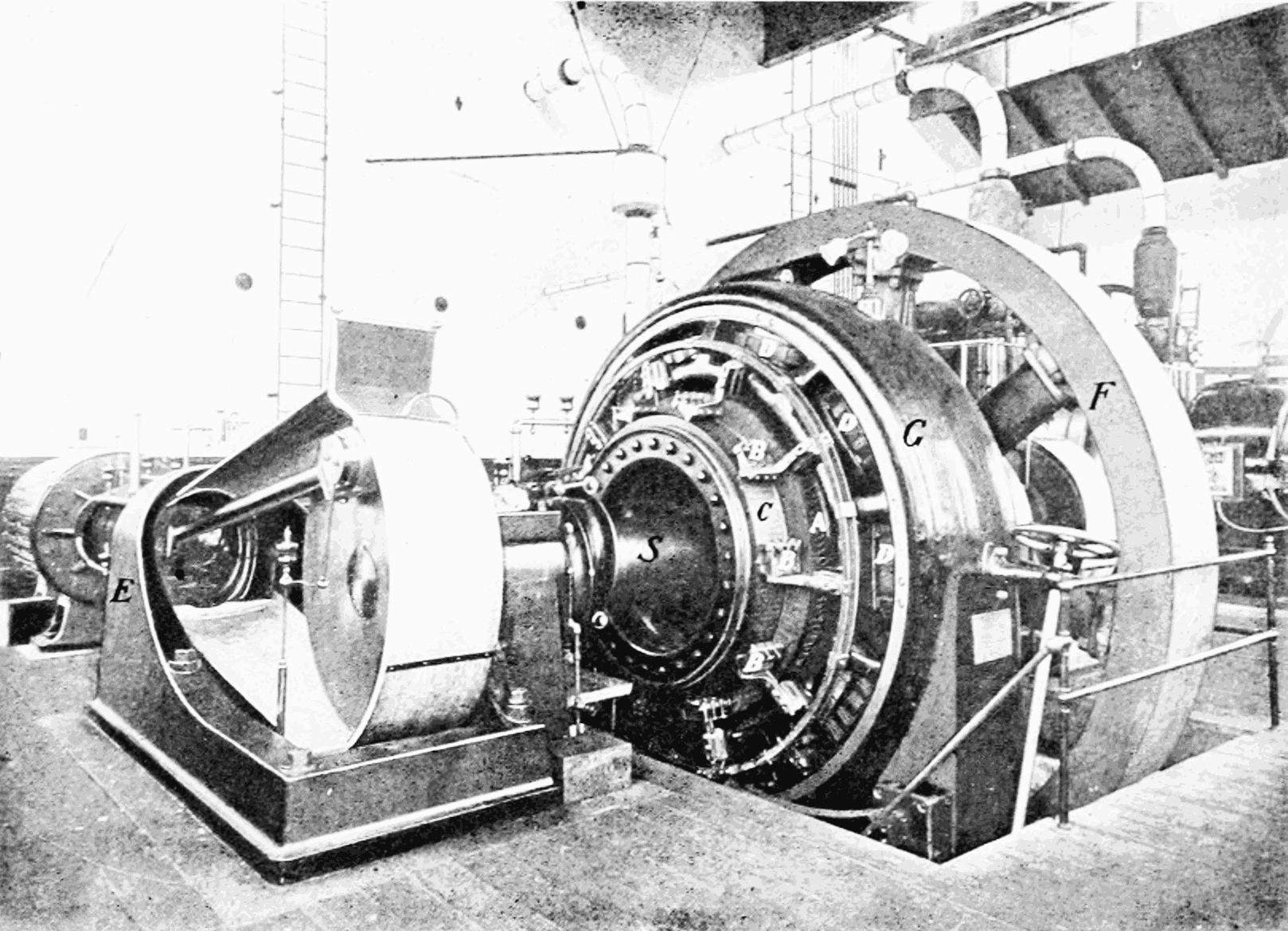
PSM V56 D0433 direct connected electric railway generator (1899)

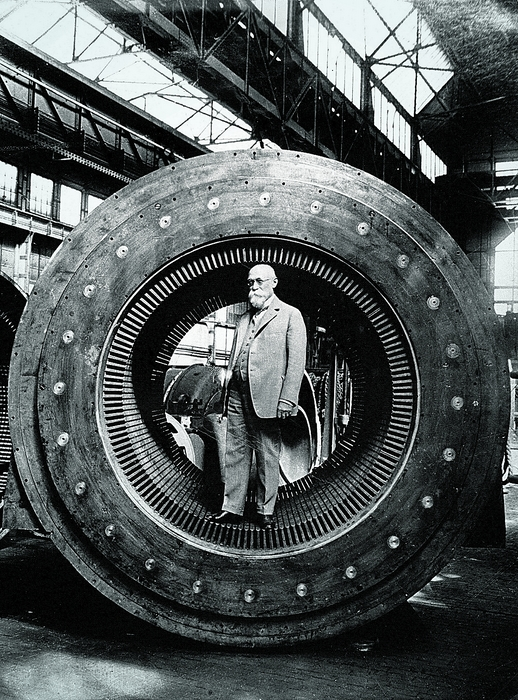
Ottó Bláthy in the armature of a turbo generator (1904)

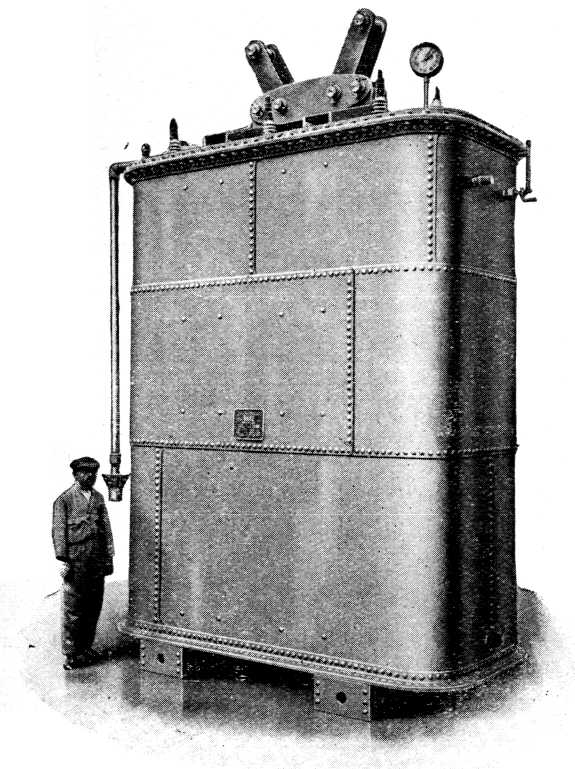
Ganz 21.000 kW Transformer (1911, weight: 38t)

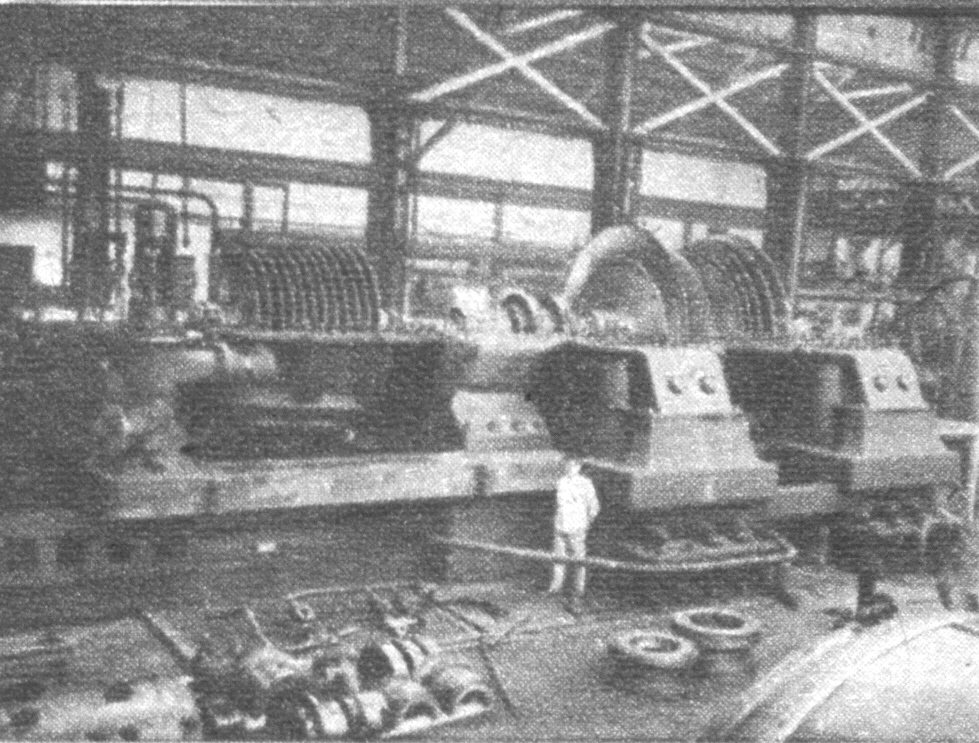
36700 hp steam turbine under construction in the Láng Machine Factory, 1913

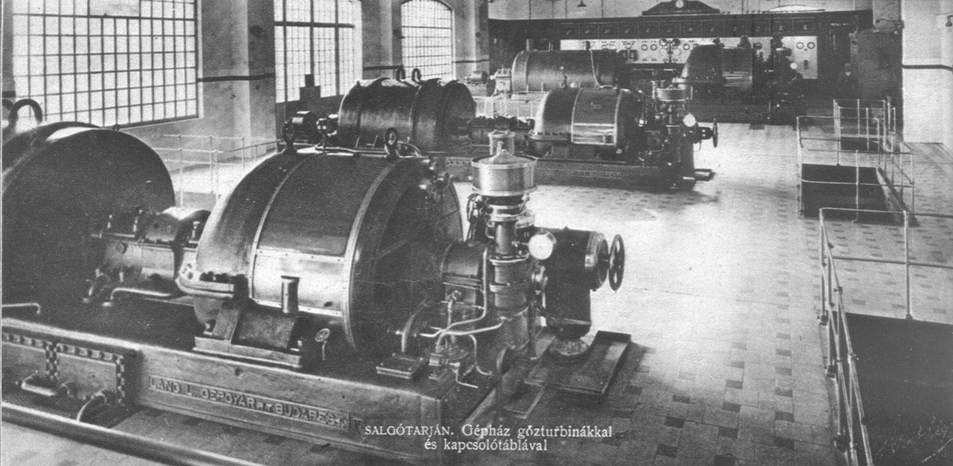
Láng turbogenerators in the Salgótarján Colliery Company, 1915

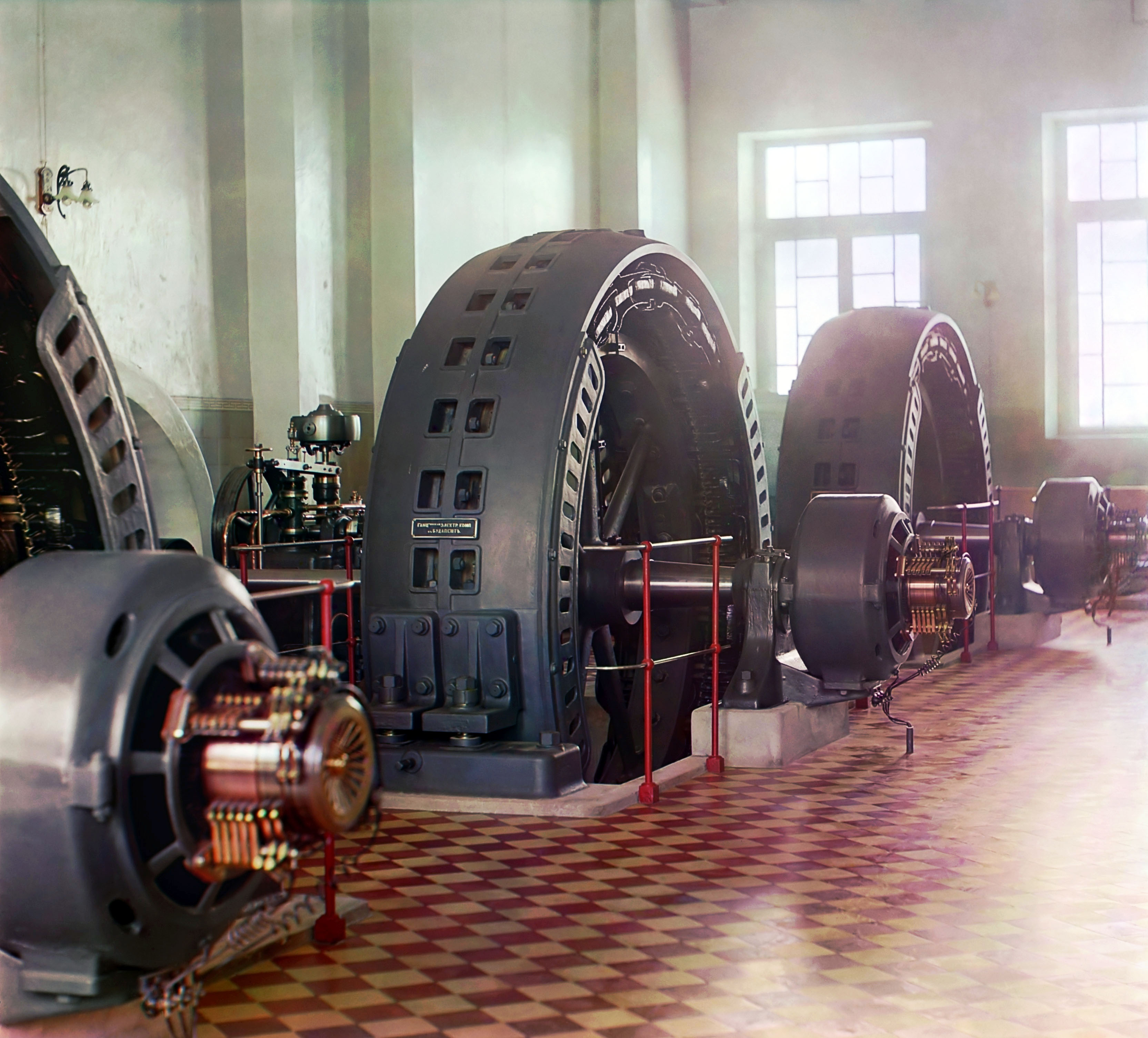
Ganz Alternators in a hydroelectric station on the Murghab River.

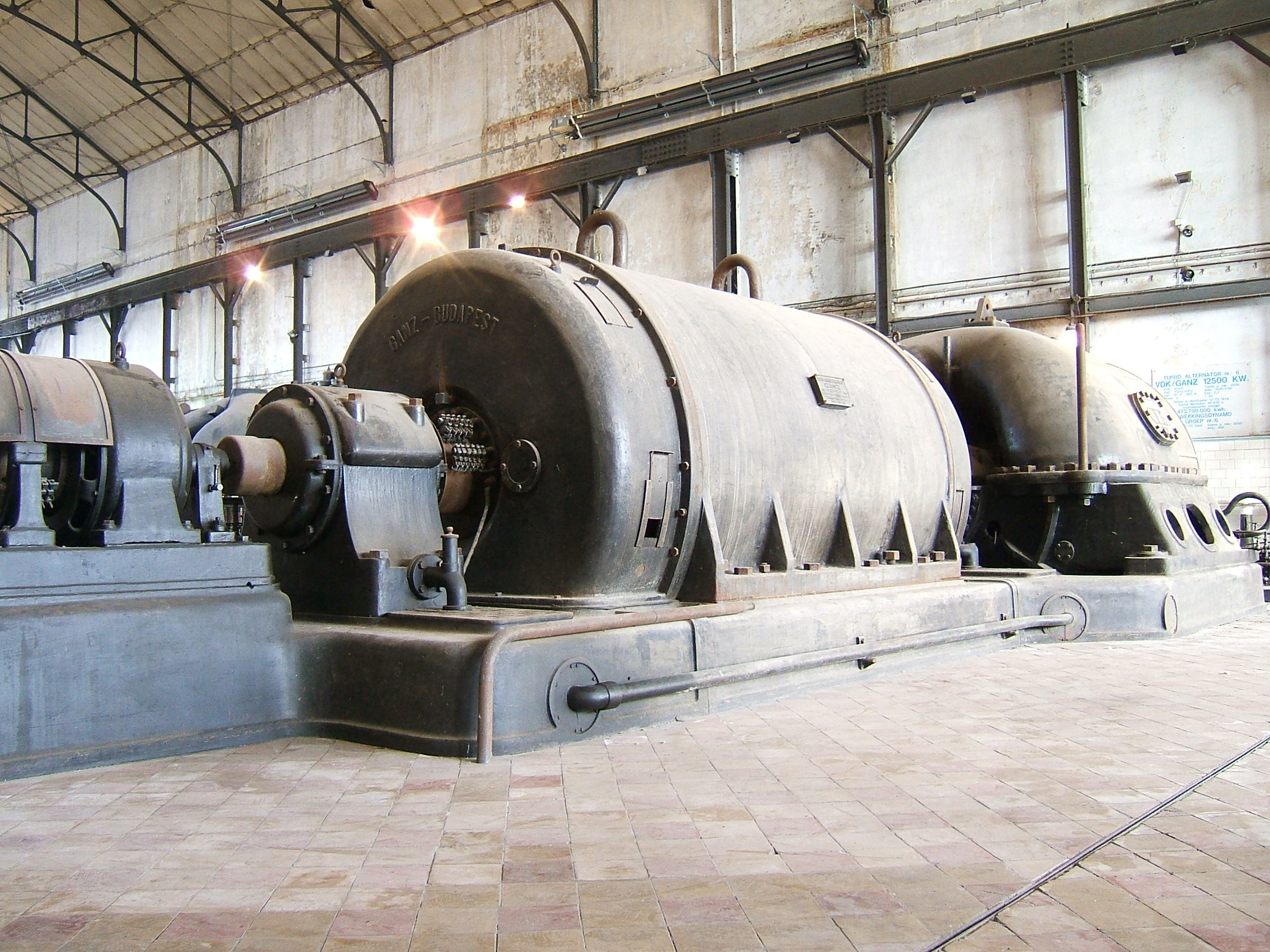
Ganz Generator in Zwevegem, West Flanders, Belgium

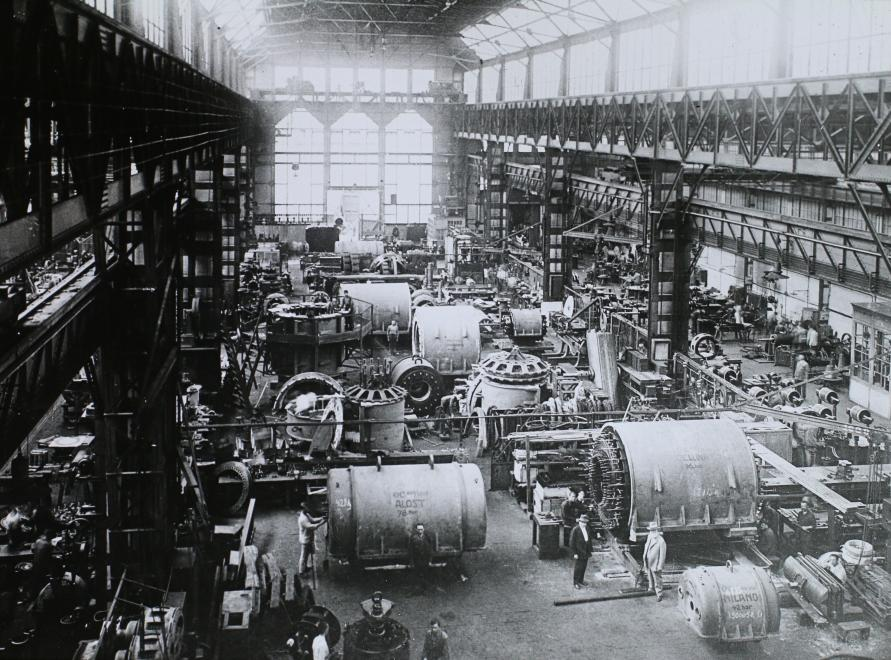
A generator assembly hall of the Ganz Works (1922)

Power plants, generators and transformers

In 1878, the Ganz company's general manager András Mechwart (1853–1942) founded the Department of Electrical Engineering headed by Károly Zipernowsky (1860–1939). Engineers Miksa Déri (1854–1938) and Ottó Bláthy (1860–1939) also worked at the department producing direct-current machines and arc lamps.

In autumn 1884, Károly Zipernowsky, Ottó Bláthy and Miksa Déri (ZBD), three engineers associated with the Ganz factory, had determined that open-core devices were impracticable, as they were incapable of reliably regulating voltage. In their joint 1885 patent applications for novel transformers (later called ZBD transformers), they described two designs with closed magnetic circuits where copper windings were either a) wound around iron wire ring core or b) surrounded by iron wire core. The two designs were the first application of the two basic transformer constructions in common use to this day, which can as a class all be termed as either core form or shell form (or alternatively, core type or shell type), as in a) or b), respectively (see images). The Ganz factory had also in the autumn of 1884 made delivery of the world's first five high-efficiency AC transformers, the first of these units having been shipped on September 16, 1884. This first unit had been manufactured to the following specifications: 1,400 W, 40 Hz, 120:72 V, 11.6:19.4 A, ratio 1.67:1, one-phase, shell form. In both designs, the magnetic flux linking the primary and secondary windings traveled almost entirely within the confines of the iron core, with no intentional path through air (see Toroidal cores below). The new transformers were 3.4 times more efficient than the open-core bipolar devices of Gaulard and Gibbs.

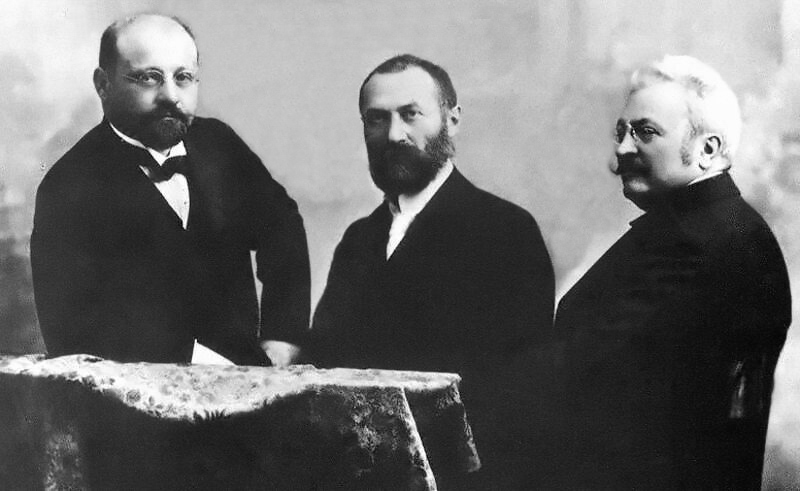
The Hungarian "ZBD" team invented the first high efficiency, closed core shunt connection transformer and practical parallel-connected distribution circuits.

The ZBD patents included two other major interrelated innovations: one concerning the use of parallel connected, instead of series connected, utilization loads, the other concerning the ability to have high turns ratio transformers such that the supply network voltage could be much higher (initially 1,400 to 2,000 V) than the voltage of utilization loads (100 V initially preferred). When employed in parallel connected electric distribution systems, closed-core transformers finally made it technically and economically feasible to provide electric power for lighting in homes, businesses and public spaces. Bláthy had suggested the use of closed cores, Zipernowsky had suggested the use of parallel shunt connections, and Déri had performed the experiments; The other essential milestone was the introduction of 'voltage source, voltage intensive' (VSVI) systems' by the invention of constant voltage generators in 1885. Ottó Bláthy also invented the first AC electricity meter. Transformers today are designed on the principles discovered by the three engineers. They also popularized the word 'transformer' to describe a device for altering the emf of an electric current, although the term had already been in use by 1882. In 1886, the ZBD engineers designed, and the Ganz factory supplied electrical equipment for, the world's first power station that used AC generators to power a parallel connected common electrical network, the steam-powered Rome-Cerchi power plant. The reliability of the AC technology received impetus after the Ganz Works electrified a large European metropolis: Rome in 1886.

Turbines and Turbogenerators

The first turbo-generators were water turbines which propelled electric generators. The first Hungarian water turbine was designed by the engineers of the Ganz Works in 1866, the mass production with dynamo generators started in 1883. The manufacturing of steam turbo generators started in the Ganz Works in 1903.

In 1905, the Láng Machine Factory company also started the production of steam turbines for alternators.

Light bulbs, radio tubes and X-ray

Tungsram is a Hungarian manufacturer of light bulbs and vacuum tubes since 1896. On 13 December 1904, Hungarian Sándor Just and Croatian Franjo Hanaman were granted a Hungarian patent (No. 34541) for the world's first tungsten filament lamp. The tungsten filament lasted longer and gave brighter light than the traditional carbon filament. Tungsten filament lamps were first marketed by the Hungarian company Tungsram in 1904. This type is often called Tungsram-bulbs in many European countries. Their experiments also showed that the luminosity of bulbs filled with an inert gas was higher than in vacuum. The tungsten filament outlasted all other types (especially the former carbon filaments). The British Tungsram Radio Works was a subsidiary of the Hungarian Tungsram in pre-WW2 days.

Despite the long experimentation with vacuum tubes at Tungsram company, the mass production of radio tubes begun during WW1, and the production of X-ray tubes started also during the WW1 in Tungsram Company.

signal generators, oscilloscopes and pulse generators

The signal generators, oscilloscopes and pulse generators manufactured by Orion's instrumentation class has helped the domestic industry as well as export.

Home appliances

The Orion Electronics was founded in 1913. Its main profiles were the production of electrical switches, sockets, wires, incandescent lamps, electric fans, electric kettles, and various household electronics.

Industrial Refrigerators

In 1894, Hungarian inventor and industrialist István Röck started to manufacture an industrial ammonia refrigerator which was powered by electric compressors (together with the Esslingen Machine Works). At the 1896 Millennium Exhibition, Röck and the Esslingen Machine Works presented a 6-tonne capacity artificial ice producing plant. Until nationalisation after the Second World War, large-scale refrigerator production in Hungary was in the hands of Röck and Ganz Works. In 1906, the first Hungarian cold store (with a capacity of 3,000 tonnes, the largest in Europe) opened in Tóth Kálmán Street, Budapest.

=== Telecommunication ===
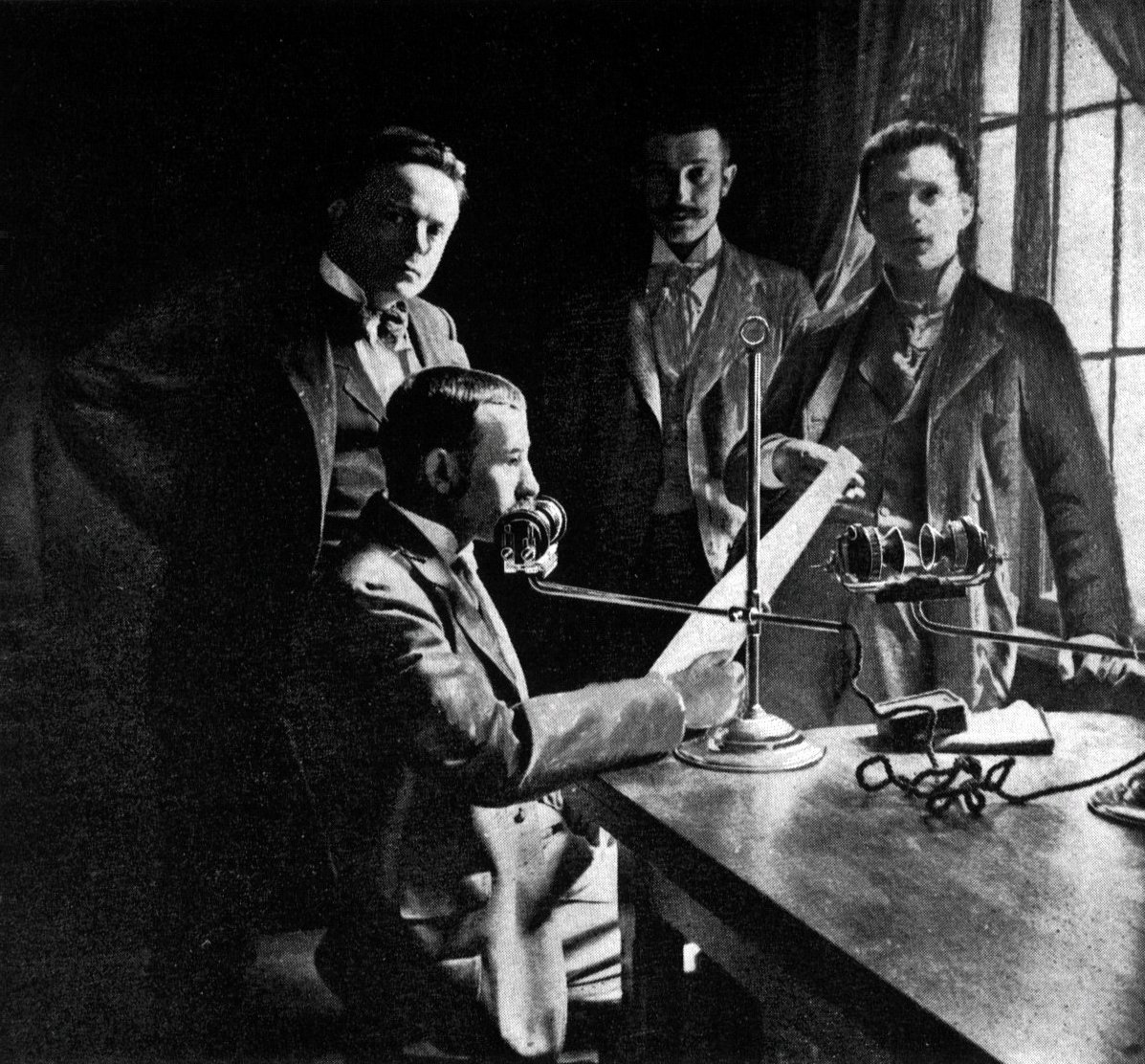
A stentor reading the day's news in the Telefon Hírmondó studio

The first telegraph station on Hungarian territory was opened in December 1847 in Pressburg/ Pozsony /Bratislava/. In 1848, – during the Hungarian Revolution – another telegraph centre was built in Buda to connect the most important governmental centres. The first telegraph connection between Vienna and Pest – Buda (later Budapest) was constructed in 1850. In 1884, 2,406 telegraph post offices operated in the Kingdom of Hungary. By 1914 the number of telegraph offices reached 3,000 in post offices, and a further 2,400 were installed in the railway stations of the Kingdom of Hungary.

The first Hungarian telephone exchange was opened in Budapest (May 1, 1881). All telephone exchanges of the cities and towns in the Kingdom of Hungary were linked in 1893. By 1914, more than 2,000 settlements had telephone exchange in the Kingdom of Hungary.

The Telefon Hírmondó (Telephone Herald) service was established in 1893. Two decades before the introduction of radio broadcasting, residents of Budapest could listen to news, cabaret, music and opera at home and in public spaces daily. It operated over a special type of telephone exchange system and its own separate network. The technology was later licensed in Italy and the United States. (see: telephone newspaper).

The first Hungarian telephone factory (Factory for Telephone Apparatuses) was founded by János Neuhold in Budapest in 1879, which produced telephones microphones, telegraphs, and telephone exchanges.

In 1884, the Tungsram company also started to produce microphones, telephone apparatuses, telephone switchboards and cables.

The Ericsson company also established a factory for telephones and switchboards in Budapest in 1911.

=== Navigation and shipbuilding ===
Ganz–Danubius ships and submarines

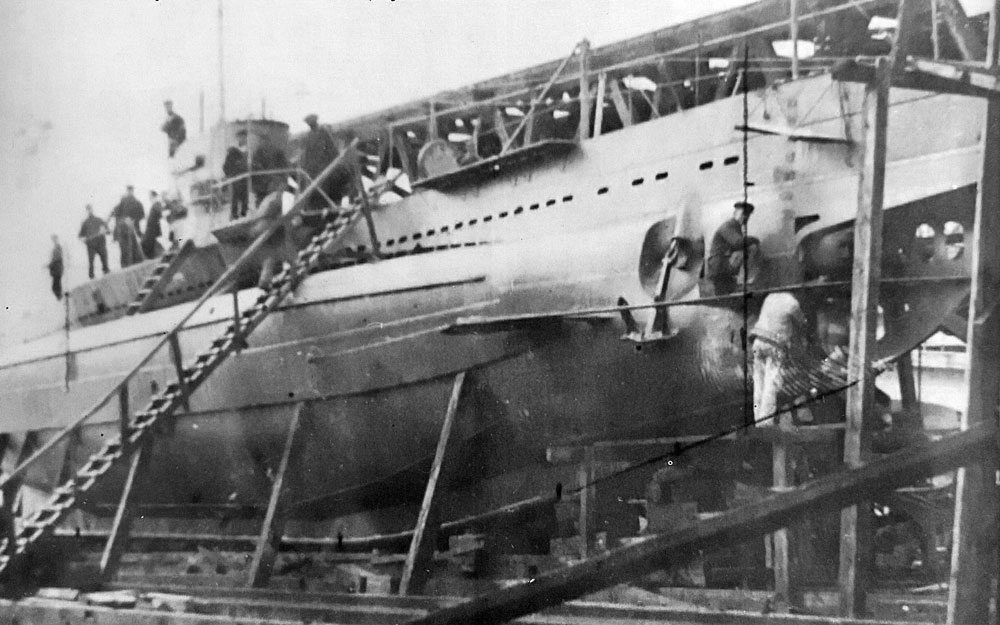
The back of U-29 submarine during assembly (24 April 1916)

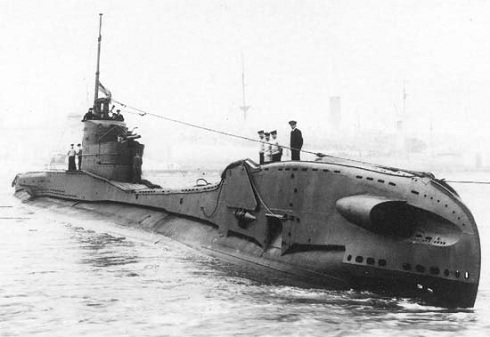
U-29 submarine of the Austro-Hungarian Navy, built by Ganz-Danubius

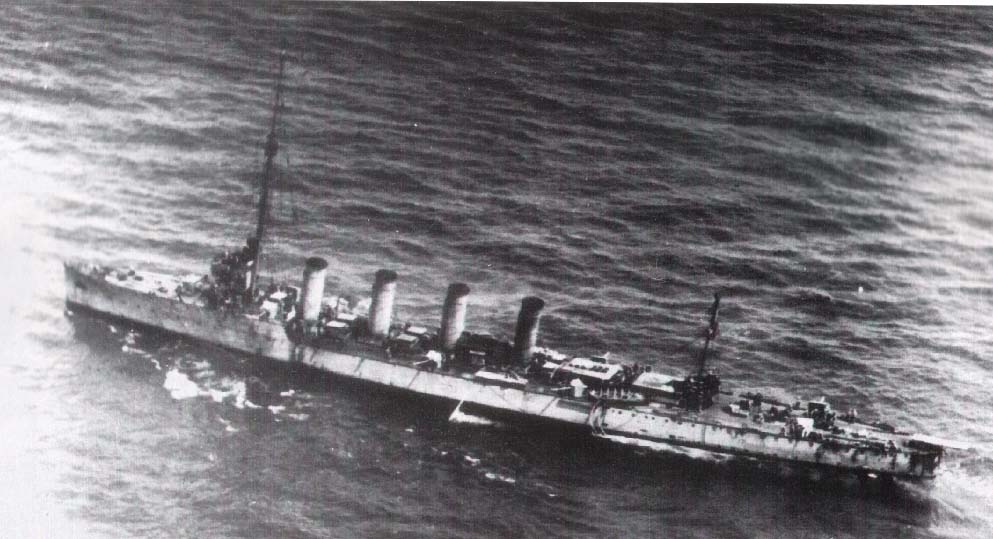
The battle-damaged SMS Novara (1913) after a victorious naval battle

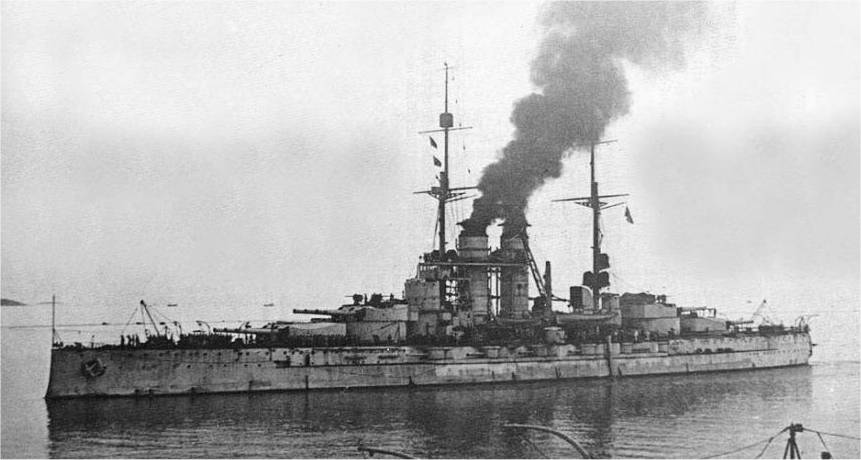
Austro-Hungarian built dreadnought class battleship SMS Szent István at Pula (military dock)

construction of SMS Szent István battleship in the Ganz Danubius shipyard in Rijeka (filmed 1912)

The first Hungarian steamship was built by Antal Bernhard in 1817, called S.S. Carolina. It was also the first steamship in Habsburg-ruled states. The daily passenger traffic between the two sides of the Danube by the Carolina started in 1820. The regular cargo and passenger transports between Pest and Vienna began in 1831. However, it was Count István Széchenyi (with the help of Austrian ship's company Erste Donaudampfschiffahrtsgesellschaft (DDSG) ), who established the Óbuda Shipyard on the Hungarian Hajógyári Island in 1835, which was the first industrial scale steamship building company in the Habsburg Empire. The most important seaport for the Hungarian part of the k.u.k. was the special territory of Fiume (Rijeka) (today part of Croatia), where the Hungarian shipping companies, such as the Adria, operated. The largest Hungarian shipbuilding company was the Ganz-Danubius. In 1911, The Ganz Company merged with the Danubius shipbuilding company, which largest shipbuilding company in Hungary. Since 1911, the unified company adopted the "Ganz – Danubius" brand name. As Ganz Danubius, the company became involved in shipbuilding before, and during, World War I. Ganz was responsible for building the dreadnought Szent István, supplied the machinery for the cruiser Novara.

Diesel-electric military submarines:

The Ganz-Danubius company started to build U-boats at its shipyard in Budapest, for final assembly at Fiume. Several U-boats of the U-XXIX class, U-XXX class, U-XXXI class and U-XXXII class were completed, and a number of other types were laid down, remaining incomplete at the war's end. The company built some ocean liners too.

In 1915, the Whitehead Torpedo Works established a submarine subsidiary, the Ungarische Unterseebotsbau AG (UBAG), lit. 'Hungarian Submarine Building Corporation', in Fiume and Linz. SM U-XX, SM U-XXI, SM U-XXII and SM U-XXIII Type diesel-electric submarines were produced by the UBAG Corporation in Fiume.

== See also ==
- Economy of Hungary
- Telecommunications in Hungary
- Hungarian Academy of Sciences
- Education in Hungary
- Hungarian mathematics
- Hungarian Space Office
- List of Hungarian Nobel laureates
- Open access in Hungary to scholarly communication
- Science and technology in Europe
- European Research Area
- European Institute of Innovation and Technology (HQ Budapest)
