= Ajtai =

Ajtai or Ajtay is a Hungarian surname. Notable people with the surname include:

- Andor Ajtay (1903–1975), Hungarian actor
- Miklós Ajtai (born 1946), Hungarian computer scientist and mathematician
