= András Mechwart =

Hungarian-German engineer

Balogh Mechwart
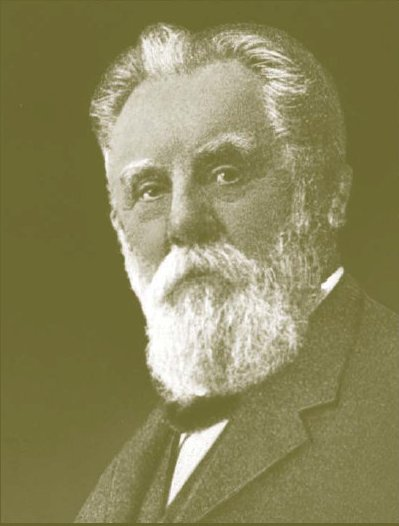
- András Mechwart de Belecska
- Born: Dániel Mechwart; 6 December 1834; Schweinfurt, Bavaria
- Died: 14 June 1907 (aged 72); Budapest, Austria-Hungary
- Education: Polytechnikum of Augsburg
- Spouse: Luise Eichleiter
- Children: Ernest; Hugo; Emma
- Parent(s): Georg Mechwart; Elisabetha Hofmann
- Engineering career
- Institutions: Ganz Works

András Mechwart de Belecska (or András Mechwart, born as Andreas Mechwart, Schweinfurt, 6 December 1834 – Budapest, 14 June 1907) was a Hungarian-German mechanical engineer, chief executive of the Ganz Works, and a pioneer in the Hungarian mechanical and electrical engineering. As an inventor and as a businessman he contributed to the development of the Hungarian transport manufacturing industry, and made the Ganz Works a flagship of the Hungarian economy of the 19th century.

== Life ==
=== Early years ===
András Mechwart was born on 6 December 1834 to Georg Mechwart and Elisabeth Hofmann in Schweinfurt, Bavaria. Because of his family's bad financial conditions he had to find a job as a child. He worked as locksmith apprentice in his neighbourhood. On his locksmith exam he made a successful Chubb detector lock which earned him a scholarship to study at the Polytechnikum (today the Augsburg University of Applied Sciences) in Augsburg where he graduated as a mechanical engineer in 1855.

Then he went to Nuremberg to work in the 'Cramer & Clett' (a predecessor of MAN Group), where he learned the construction of bridges, wagons and machines of the mill industry.

In 1859 he got a job offer in Lemberg, Galicia (today Lviv, Ukraine) at the 'Carl-Ludwigs-Bahn', but on the road to his new home, he visited his friend, Antal Eichleiter who worked in Ábrahám Ganz's Ganz Works in Buda. Eichleiter introduced Mechwart to his boss who asked him to stay there because he wanted to expand his foundry with a machine factory. Mechwart accepted the job and started to work there as a supervising engineer in the newly opened machine factory of the Ganz Works.

=== As supervising engineer at the Ganz Works (1859–1867) ===
They produced there at that time chill casting cylinders for mills and different types of machine parts. Among the work equipments of the factory there were lathes, drillings, planers and wheelpresses. The power tools were driven by a 15-horsepower steam engine. He made soon several improvements, technical rationalizations in the plant's facilities.

As the railway construction boom began in Austria-Hungary the factory had a rapid growth. Ganz bought a new ground, built a new foundry and a big boilerhouse. In 1865 Ganz left him to lead parts of the businesses. In 1867 the company had already five departments: foundry, machine factory and the workshops of the locksmiths, smith and the sample table. At that time the number of employees rose to 370. The achieved results reflected the success of the factory, at the World's Fairs in London in 1862 and in Paris in 1867 the company was awarded with silver medals.

=== In the management of the Ganz Works (1867–1873) ===
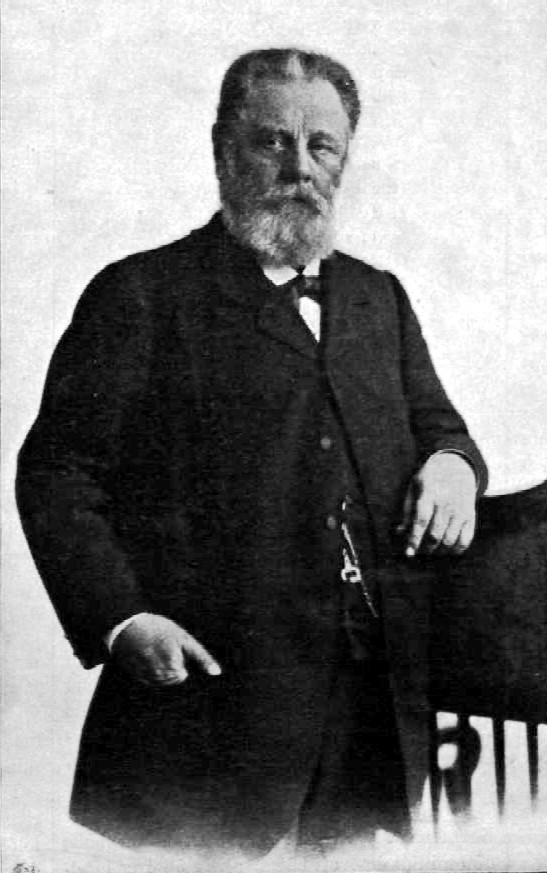
András Mechwart in 1899

After Abraham Ganz's death in December 1867, the heirs entrusted Eichleiter, Keller and Mechwart with the operational and business management. The factory changed its name to 'Ganz & Co.' (Ganz és Társa). But after two years the heirs living in Switzerland sold the factory, and after a short reorganization the new manager of 'Ganz & Co. Iron Foundry & Machine Factory Inc.' (Ganz és Társa Vasöntő és Gépgyár Rt.) was Mechwart.

The reorganization did not affect the factory's life. This is evidenced by the fact that despite the crisis between 1870 and 1872, a commission of 6–8% was paid, and then they opened a new machine factory in Racibórz, Poland. As the recognition of the good work, the Ganz factory won a gold medal in Moscow in 1872, and on the World Exhibition in Vienna the company got honorary diploma in 1873.

In 1873, a crisis hit the factory when Eichleiter and Keller left the business. After 1874 Mechwart became the CEO of the company and he handled alone the work in the organization, managing and market research fields.

=== As the CEO of the Ganz Works (1873–1899) ===
As the head of the factory, his activities were imbued with the aspiration to create job opportunities, competitive and modern products and to find market for the produced goods. For these aims the factory grew incessantly, and by 1900 it became a huge corporation with three smelteries and five machine producing facilities.

- smeltery in Szászka, Banat, Austria-Hungary (est. 1850)
- machine factory in Racibórz, Silesia, Prussia (est. 1869) – with the aim to compete with the German machine factories
- smeltery in Alsó-Mecenzéf, Austria-Hungary (est. 1872)
- electrical department in Kacsa Street, Víziváros, Budapest, Austria-Hungary (est. 1878)
- wagon manufacturing site of the 'First Hungarian Wagon Factory Inc.' (Első Magyar Vasúti Kocsigyár Rt.) Kőbányai út, Budapest, Austria-Hungary (purchased in 1880)
- machine factory in Leobersdorf, Austria-Hungary (purchased in 1887)
- blast furnace in Topusko, Kingdom of Croatia-Slavonia, Austria-Hungary (rent since 1880)

In 1900 the Ganz Works was the only Hungarian factory that had producing sites outside of Hungary. However, it should be added that the large scale development of the company beginning in 1869 was not fault and crisis-free. For instance the crisis between 1874 and 1876 threatened its existence. In that difficult times Mechwart could choose the most appropriate products to survive the crisis. They made wagon wheels, railway crossings, artillery etc.

=== The roller mill ===
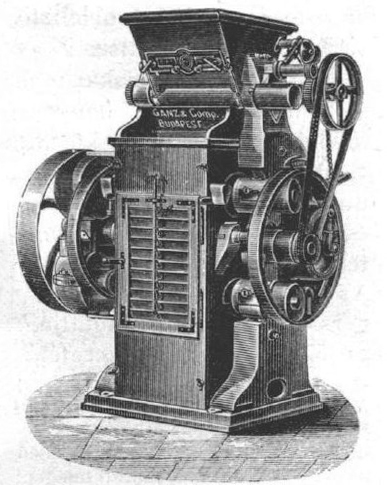
András Mechwart's roller mill (1874)

Mechwart bought in 1874 Friedrich Wegmann's patent of the roller mill that the inventor could not sell for a long time. He improved it and the Ganz Works started to produce Mechwart's version. Wegmann's roller mill was made of fragile porcelain wheels and it was a simple structure of grain mill grinding mechanism. Mechwart changed the porcelain wheels to wear-resistant, hard cast, obliquely grooved grinding rolls and he used strings to clamp the grinding rolls and covered the roller mill as well.

The quality of the grinding of the diagonally grooved rollers were determined by the mechanical treatment of the notches, the number of notches, shape, inclination and position relative to each other. Mechwart constructed the structure and improved it to a perfectly usable machine. His patented version became world-famous. The Ganz Works produced until the end of the 19th century about sixty different types of roller mills. For the modern Hungarian steam powered mills they manufactured Haggenmacher-printing machines and driving force, but it really was the roller mill which helped to bring the Hungarian milling industry the world-fame. The development of the factory is related closely to the production of the roller mill which pulled the company through the downturns of the financial crises.

=== Electrical Department ===
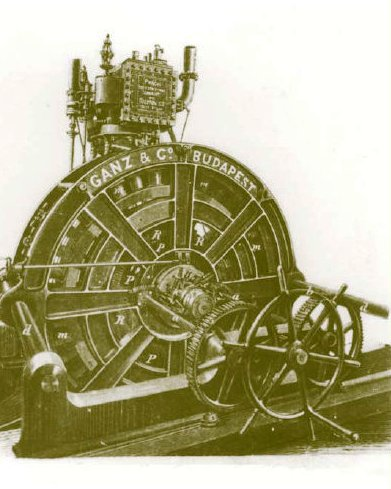
Steam powered lighting machine (1883)

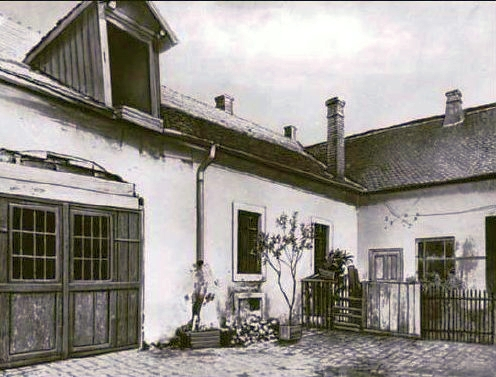
The yard of the Electric Department of the Ganz Works in 18 Kacsa Street, Budapest, Austria-Hungary (1878)

Mechwart had already before the World's Fair in 1878 discovered the importance of electricity. In 1878 he established a small electrical workshop in the Kacsa Street whose activity was at the beginning not beneficial. With his personal call became the inventor trio (Károly Zipernowsky, Miksa Déri and Ottó Bláthy) engineers of the Ganz Works. They made the factory with their knowledge Europe's first electrical company. One of their first project was the planning and implementation of the electrical lighting of the National Theatre in Budapest which was the second in its type in Europe when it was completed. In the Electrical Exhibition in 1884 in Vienna the company introduced its own dynamos and among them that machine as well in which Mechwart and Zipernowsky connected the axes of a dynamo and a steam engine.

The production of the alternating current dynamo of Déri and Zipernowsky started in 1884. With this machine they could provide constant current for arc lamps and – with a compensator keeping the voltage steady – light bulbs as well. In the same year Déri, Zipernowsky and Bláthy took out a patent on the transformer whose application was shown in 1885 in Budapest, Antwerp and London getting numerous orders from the inland and abroad.

Around 1890 they started to deal with the practicability of the railway electric traction. At that time the Pozsony (today Bratislava) and Budapest-Újpest-Rákospalota electric railway lines were the most significant projects in Hungary. The planning and construction works were led by Kálmán Kandó who was since 1895 the leader of the Electrical Department of the Ganz Works.

Not so important, but also a successful product was Mechart's own version of the plow machine. They started to produce plow machines in 1889 at the beginning according to foreign patents. Based on Mechwart's patents on locomobile rotary plow machine (steam used to drive machinery) their products could compete with others in Europe. Donát Bánki who was working on the rotary plow machine since beginning, changed the original steam engine structure to a petroleum motor and with this he contributed largely to that the rotary plow became one of the greatest technical innovations of that era.

Mechwart's electric motor powered felling machine was created for domestic needs and for the hopes of mass production. 29% of the territory of Hungary was at that time covered in forest and the timber were cut with hand tools. The machine consists of three main components: an electric motor, wood biter and a two-wheeled trolley-like vehicle. Although the machine cut out four times as much wood as the loggers, in practical terms it was not suitable to spread on the market.

=== Carburetor ===
The 'Ganz & Co. Inc.'(Ganz és Társa Rt.) started according to the patent of András Mechwart the production of solvable clutches. In 1896 seven different types were made in different sizes. The solvable clutch was made in that time when the importance of the in- and out switch during operation became significant. Partially because of the motor powered factories grew rapidly and partially because of the accident prevention. This innovation worked well in practice.

Mechwart get in contact with János Csonka as well. By the buying of the factory in Leobersdorf they had a lot of finished, but non-functioning engines. Mechwart left the repairing of these engines to Donát Bánki and to the leader of the training workshop of the Technical University of Budapest, János Csonka who was already well known because of his engine constructions. Their cooperation consisted beside the repairing of these non-functioning engines, also the gas- and petroleum engines between 1889 and 1896. As a result of their common improvements the carburetor was born in 1893.

== Personal life ==
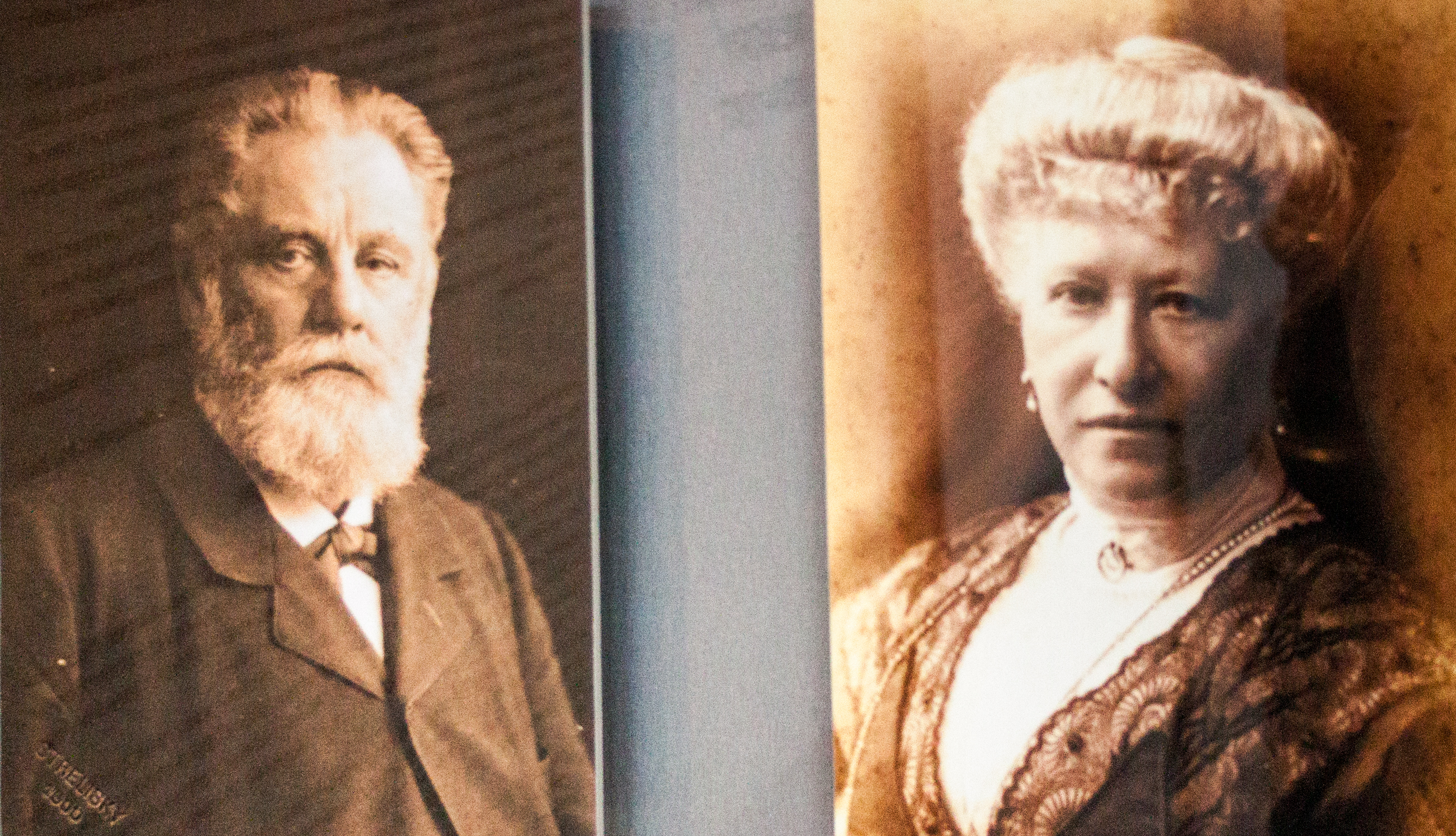
András Mechwart and Lusie Eichleiter (1890)

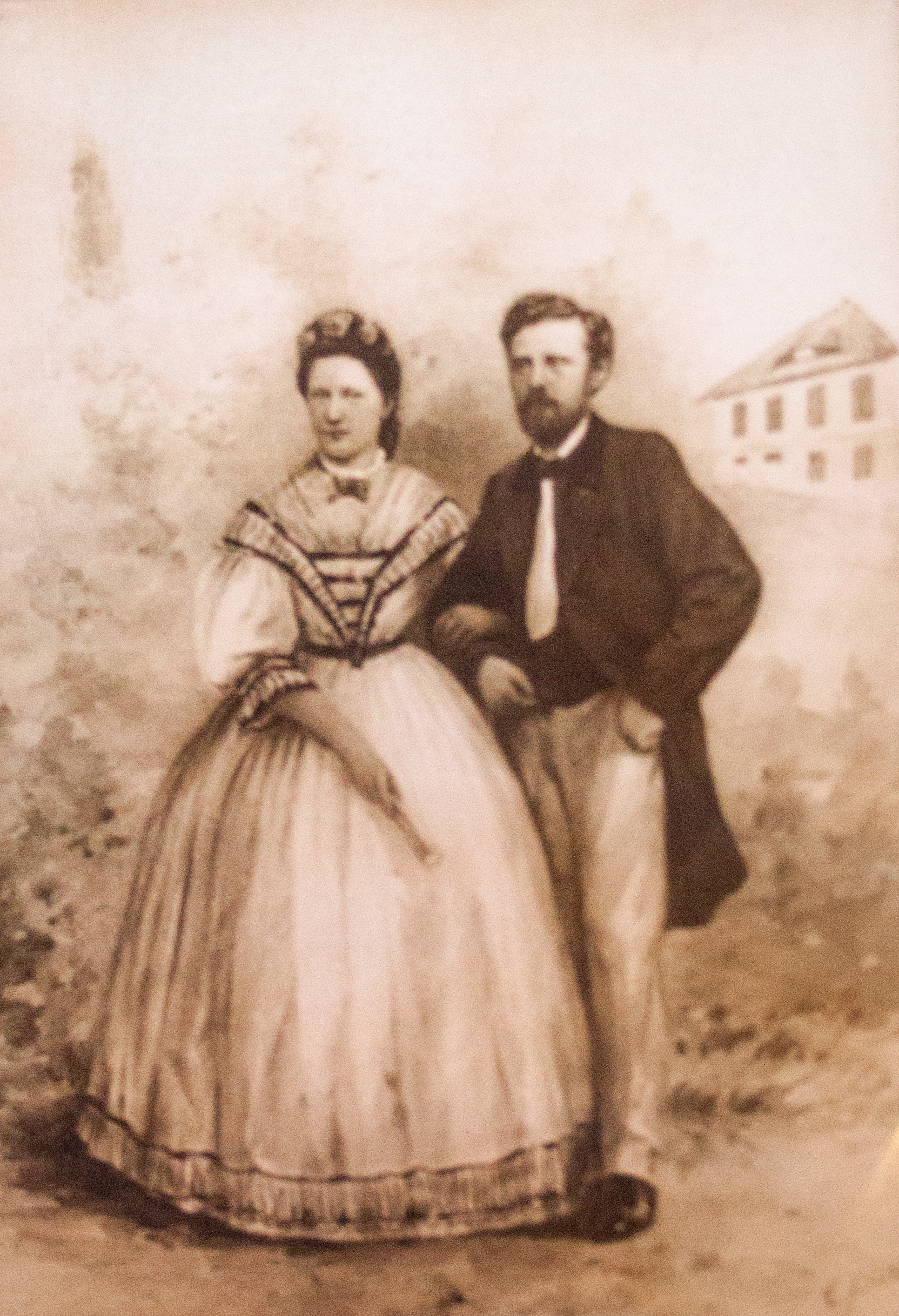
Mechwart with his wife in 1866

He married his friend's, Antal Eichleiter's sister, Luise Eichleiter on the 14 August 1866 in his hometown Schweinfurt. They had three children: Ernest, Hugo and Emma.

He suffered from typhus for a short time, but his sister-in-law, Doris, wife of Antal Eichleiter could cure him out.

His mother tongue was German which he used with his family and in the factory as well. But according to some sources he also wanted to learn the Hungarian language which was a huge challenge for him. He loved literature and he wrote some poems as well.

For Antal Eichleiter's silver wedding Mechwart wrote this poem:

"Auf Grünen Gefilde, auf schattiger Höhe

Nahe den Bergen, hoch über dem See'n
Thront ein Haus heut im Glanze der Kerzen,
Offen die Türen, offen die Herzen
Nie strahlte die Freude hier heller als heute.

Drinnen sitzet im festlichen Prangen
Oben ein Brautpaar von Liebe umfangen
Rings ihre Kinder – der häusliche Segen
Jubeln dem glücklichen Paare entgegen
Silbernen Glanz strahlt der bräutliche Kranz.

Einig und innig, gleich früheren Tagen
Innig und herzlich, wir Grüsse Euch sagen
Chöre con Grüssen, wie klingende Lieder
Lassen nun Eure Herzen sich nieder
Einer Wolke gleich,
In des Glückes Reich

Trag Euch empor unser Wünschen und Lieben,
Erdwärts sei Leiden und Sorgen verbleiben
Ruhevoll breite das Leben sich Euch!"

— András Mechwart

== Death ==
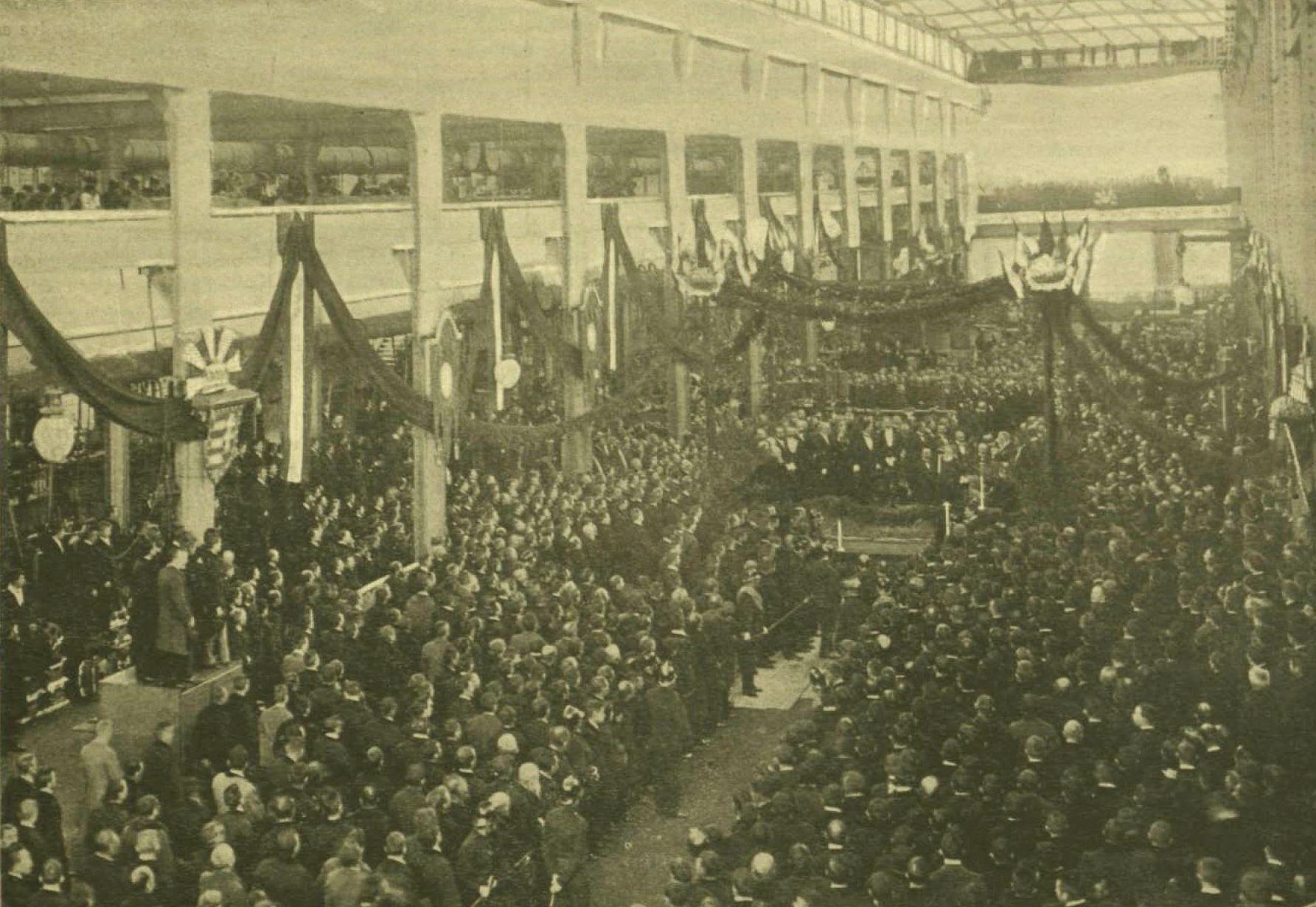
Ceremony in honor of András Mechwart on his 40th year of work jubilee (6 December 1899)

Mechwart retired on his 65th birthday (6 December 1899) after 40 years of work. But until his death he worked in the factory as an expert. He died on 14 June 1907.

== Patents ==
His patents include:

- Mechanical roller mill (Mechanische Walzenmangel, 26.7.1872)
- Track heart piece (Wendeherzstücke, 27.6.1874)
- Corrugated rollers for grain flakes (Riffelwalzen für Getreideschroten, 13.3.1875)
- Hard cast grenades (Hartgußgranaten, 13.3.1875)
- Grenades (Granate, 13.3.1875)
- Roller pair belt drive (Walzenpaar Riemenantrieb, 3.8.1875)
- Schrapnell for naval and coastal guards (Schrapnell für Marinegeschütze und Küstengeschütze, 20.3.1877)
- Balk support with ventilation (Dippelbaumauflager mit Ventilation, 4.8.1877)
- Discovery of mechanical roller mills (Erfindung einer mechanischen Walzenmenge, 26.6.1877)
- Roller mill (Walzenstuhl, 1.3.1878)
- Chill cast cylinder (Hartgußwalzen, 12.8.1878)
- Stretch works for all art of rolling mill (Spannringe für Walzwerke jeder Art, 8.2.1879)
- Pressure-relieving bearing or clamping rings for rolling mills (Lagerentlastungsringe für Walzwerke mit Spannvorrichtungen, 21.5.1879)
- Roller arrangement for bearing relief rings (Rollenanordnung für Lagerentlastungsringe, 5.5.1880)
- Roller mills (Walzenstühle, 2.10.1881)
- Differential moving for meal roller mills (Differentialbewegung für Mahlwalzenstühle, 11.4.1882)
- Steam lighting machine (Dampflichtmaschine, 18.4.1884)
- Adjustable friction clutch (Regulierbare Friktionskuppelung, 26.1.1885)
- Appetizer for green malt (Speiseapparat für Grünmalz, 9.4.1886)
- Steam boiler with big water surface (Dampfkessel mit großer Wasserfläche, 17.4.1886)
- Belt drive for roller mills (Antrieb von Walzenstühlen mit Riemen, 4.6.1886)
- Improvements on gear wheels (Verbesserung an Zahnrädern, 20.9.1886)
- Improved cast iron wheel for wagons (Verbessertes gegossenes Eisenbahnrad, 25.2.1887)
- Rotary plow (Rotierender Pflug, 12.10.1887)
- Electrical felling machine (Elektrische Baumfällmaschine, 9.11.1888)
- Rotary plow (Rotierender Pflug, 19.6.1894)
- Engine drive for cars (Motorenantrieb für Wagen, 23.8.1894)

== Literature ==
- Terplán, Zénó (translated from the original German biography of Antal Eichleiter): Ki vezette a gyárat Ganz Ábrahám (1814–1867) halála után? (Who lead the factory after the death of Ábrahám Ganz?)
- Pénzes, István: Mechwart András (Műszaki nagyjaink 2. kötet. GTE, Bp., 1983)
- Gajdos, Gusztáv: Mechwart András (Magyar feltalálók, találmányok. Műszaki Könyvkiadó, 1997)
