= Ábrahám Ganz =

Swiss-born iron manufacturer (1814–1867)

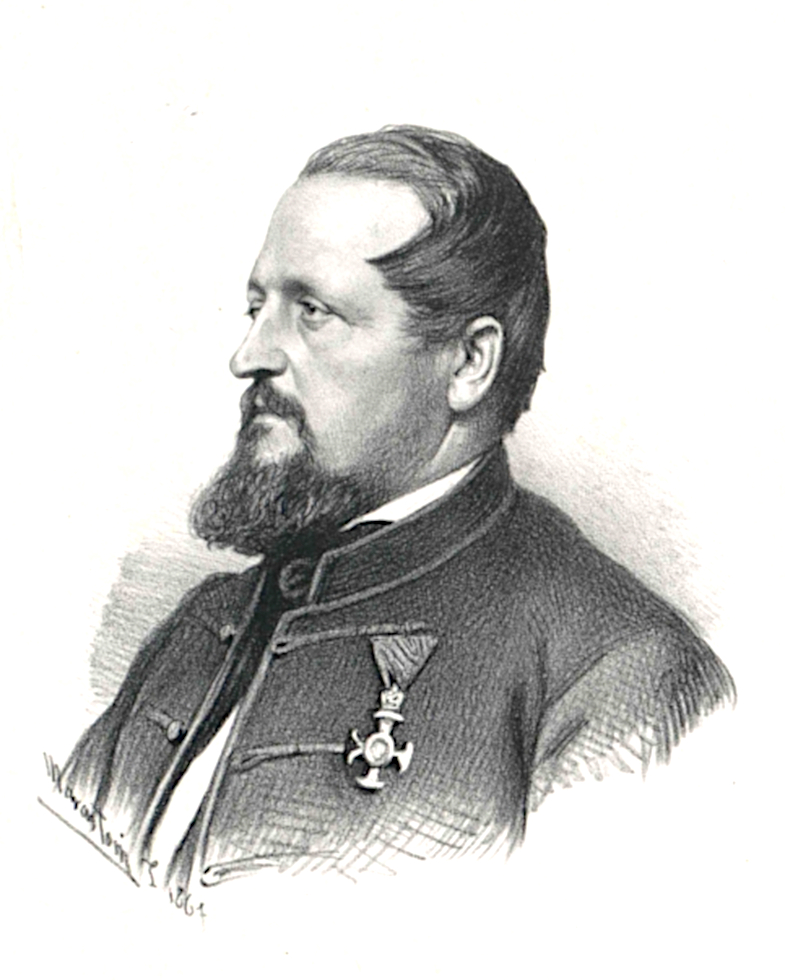
- Portrait of Ganz
- Born: Abraham Ganz; 6 November 1814; Unter-Embrach, Switzerland
- Died: 15 December 1867 (aged 53); Pest, Austria-Hungary
- Spouse: Jozefa Heiss
- Children: Jozefina; Anna Pospech
- Parent(s): Johann Ulrich Ganz; Katharina Remi
- Engineering career
- Discipline: mechanical engineer entrepreneur iron manufacturer father of Ganz Works
- Institutions: Escher Wyss AG; Josef Rollmill Company (József Hengermalom Társulat); Ganz Works
- Projects: mold made of cast iron (23.04.1855) improving the hardness of the surface of cast iron for steel making (27.11.1856) hard cast wheels for railroad cars (13.06.1857) improved heart pieces of railway crossings (02.12.1861) distillation unit (16.01.1865) reversing the intersection of railways (20.05.1865)

Ábrahám Ganz (born as Abraham Ganz; 6 November 1814 – 15 December 1867) was a Swiss-born iron manufacturer, machine and technical engineer, entrepreneur, father of Ganz Works. He was the founder and the manager of the company that he made the flagship of the Hungarian economy in the 19th century. Despite his early death in 1867 the company remained one of the strongest manufacturing enterprise in Austria-Hungary. Many famous engineers worked at Ganz Works inter alia Károly Zipernowsky, Ottó Bláthy, Miksa Déri, András Mechwart, Kálmán Kandó, Donát Bánki, János Csonka and Theodore von Kármán and several world-famous inventions were done there, like the first railway electric traction, or the invention of the roller mill, the carburetor, the transformer and the Bánki-Csonka engine.

== Life ==
=== Early years ===
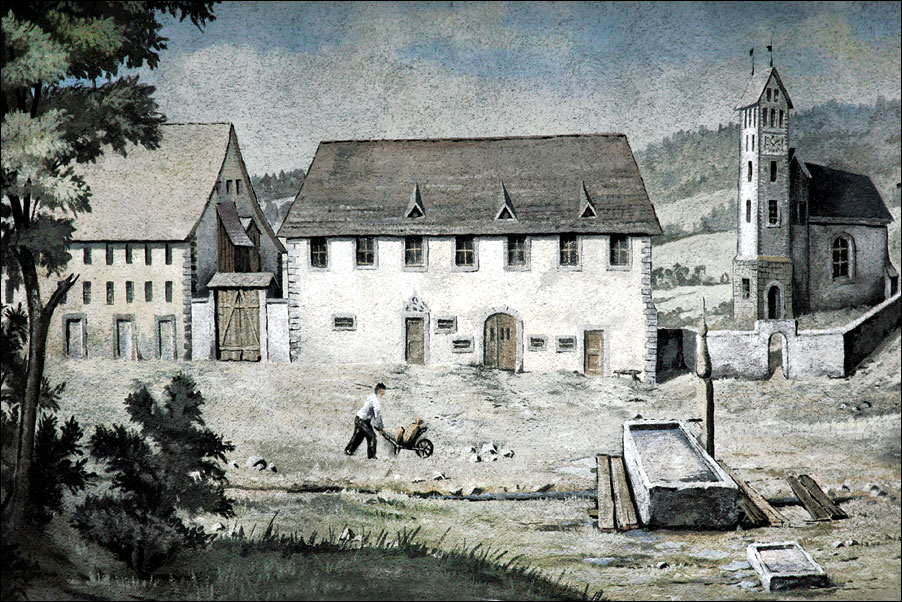
Unter-Embrach, Switzerland, the birthplace of Ábrahám Ganz

He was born into a Swiss Calvinist family in Unter-Embrach. His father, Johann Ulrich Ganz, was a cantor teacher. His mother, Katharina Remi, died when he was just 10 years old. He was the oldest son out of nine children.

=== Escher Wyss AG ===
Because of financial difficulties he had to work as a carpenter's apprentice, but before his liberation he went to Zürich to work at the foundry of Escher Wyss AG as a casting apprentice. At the age of twenty he travelled a lot in Germany, France, Austria and Italy, and worked in different factories where he gathered experience. In 1841 he arrived in Buda where he was involved in the construction of the Szechenyi Mill.

=== Josef Rollmill Company (József Hengermalom Társulat) ===
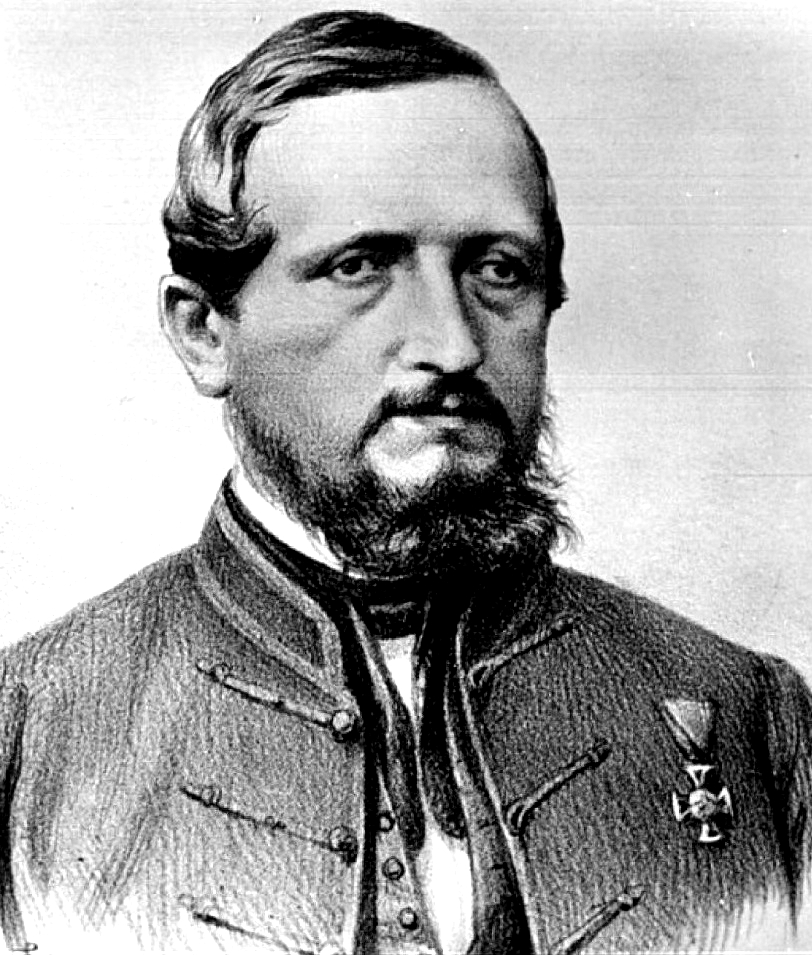
Ábrahám Ganz

István Széchenyi initiated the building of a steam mill in Buda, and he established the Josef Rollmill Company (József Hengermalom Társulat). Ábrahám Ganz started to work there as a mechanic. He saw that there was a lack of good iron industry experts in the quickly developing Hungarian manufacturing industry. Soon, he became the first casting master of the foundry of the steam mill. The foundry could achieve, with the new technology of indirect casting, very pure casts which made it easier to combine different metals. The finished casts were introduced to the public at the first Hungarian Industrywork Exhibition (Magyar Iparmű Kiállítás) in 1842. Their special combination and purity was praised even by Lajos Kossuth. After that Ganz was nominated to be the head of the foundry and the machine repairing yard. In the same year he gave a job to his brother, Konrád Ganz, who was also a casting master.

In 1843, while he was working in the foundry, the cast splashed out. He became blind in one of his eyes. According to some sources he said then:

"One eye is lost, but the casting was successful."

— Ábrahám Ganz

=== Ganz Works ===
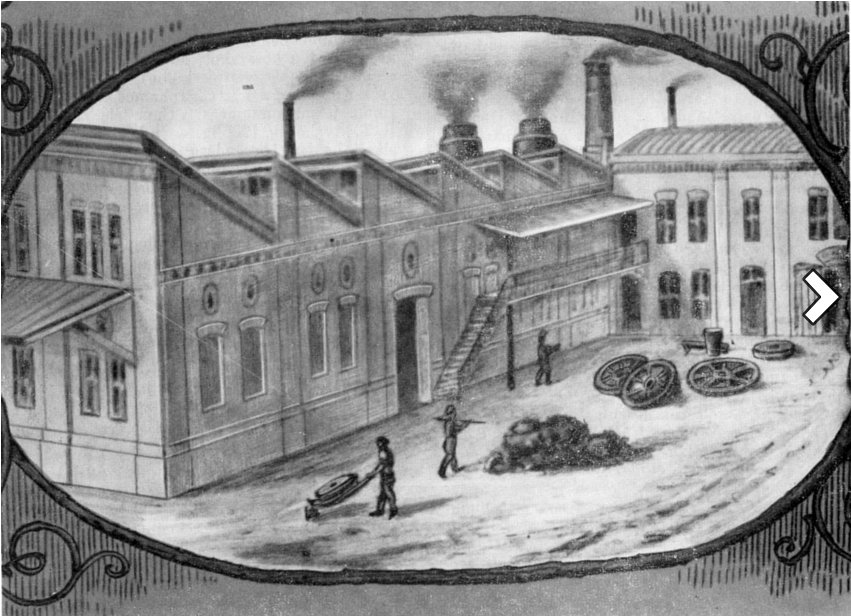
The building of the foundry (today 20 Bem József Street, Budapest)

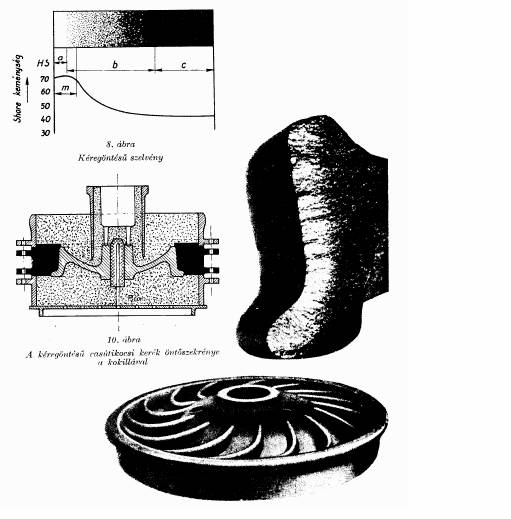
Hard cast wheel according to Ábrahám Ganz's own patent

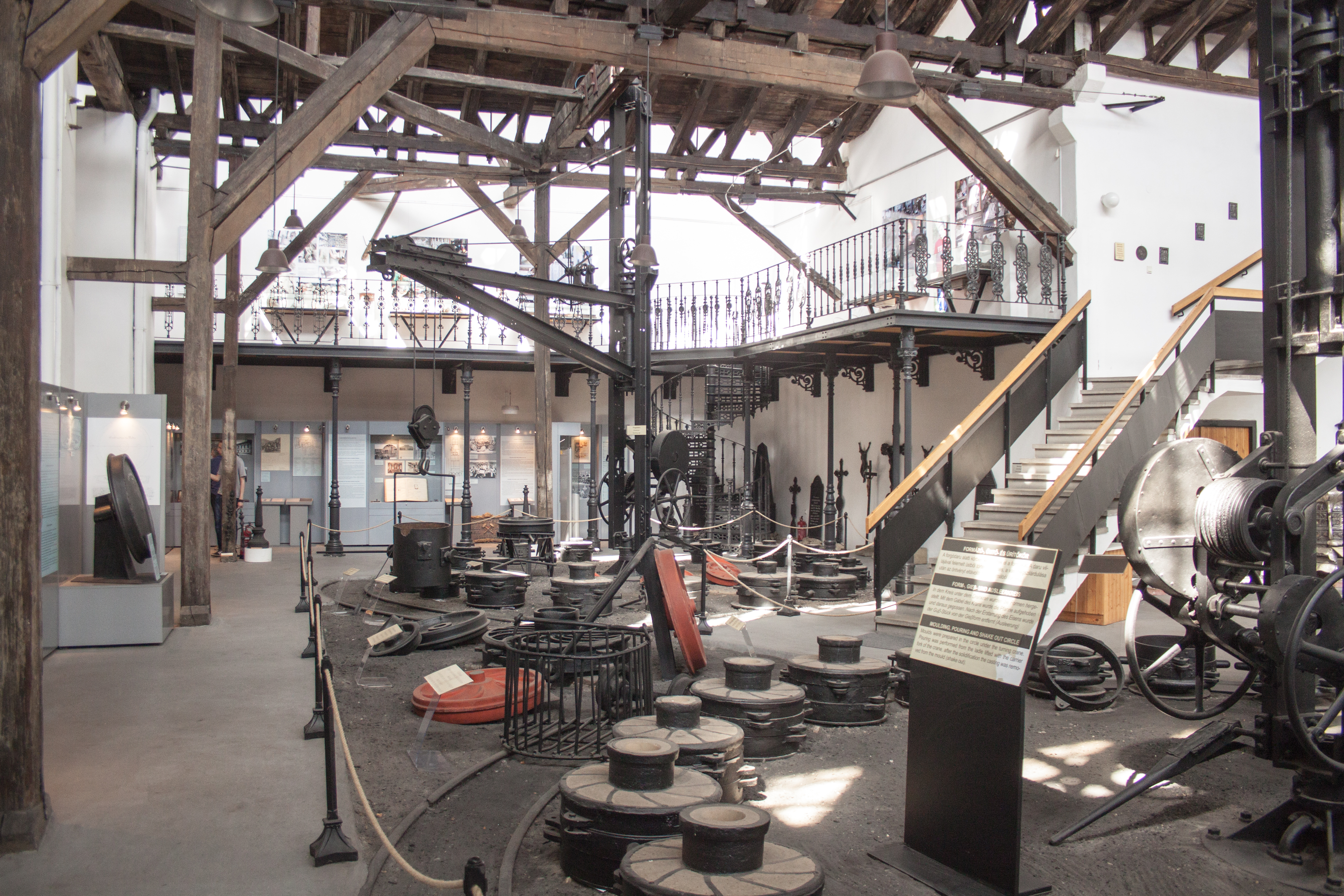
Interior of the Foundry Museum (Öntödei Múzeum)(today 20 Bem József Street, Budapest)

The management of the steam mill paid a share of the profit to Ganz. This enabled him to buy, in 1844, land and a house for 4500 Forints in Víziváros. He built his own foundry on this site and started to work there with seven assistants. They made mostly casting products for the needs of the people of the city. In 1845, he bought the neighbouring site and expanded his foundry with a cupola furnace. He gave his brother, Henrik a job as a clerk, because of the growing administration work. He made a profit in the first year, and his factory grew, even though he had not yet engaged in mass production. In 1846, at the third Hungarian Industrywork Exhibition (Magyar Iparmű Kiállítás), he introduced his stoves to the public. He won the silver medaille of the exhibition committee and the bronze medaille from Archduke Joseph, Palatine of Hungary.

During the Hungarian Revolution of 1848 to 1849 the foundry made ten cannons and many cannonballs for the Hungarian army. Because of this, the Military Court of Austria impeached him. He got seven weeks in prison as penalty, but because of his Swiss citizenship he was acquitted of the charge.

Ganz recognized that, to develop his factory, he had to make products that were mass-produced. In 1846 the Pest-Vác railway line was built. At that time, European foundries made wrought iron rims for spoked wagon wheels by pouring the casts in shapes in sand, and leaving them to cool down. Meanwhile, in the United States and England a better method was being used. This was chill casting, which was invented by the Englishman John Burn in 1812. The essence of this process is to cool the cast faster. The metal will then be harder, and have better wear-resistance. This is possible if the casting frame is made of a good heat conductor. Ganz made one for the first time in 1853 and he was able to improve the method further by using antimony. He got a patent for this invention in 1856.

Ganz describes thus the essence of his process:

"To get a hard cast, the so-called casting crust, as main equipment we use antimony. We grind it tiny and we make paint or dollop of it. We cover the walls of the casting shape with it, then we dry it and pull it together. Finally, we heat it to 100 degrees, and the liquid iron is poured into the mold. At the place where the mould walls are coated with said material, a glass hard crust is formed, which - depending on whether the wall of the cover is thinner or thicker - is two, three or four millimeters in thickness. That is why I have found antimony the best material for the production ..."

— Ábrahám Ganz

He used antimony for covering the inner surface of the mold casting to separate the fluid iron from the cooling iron. This was the source of his success. Between 1852 and 1862 he built and ran Europe's first, and for a long time only, crust wheel foundry. His customers were Austro-Hungarian, German, French and Russian railway companies. Because of the large number of orders his foundry proved to be too small, so he built a new factory in 1858.

Between 1853 and 1866 his company delivered 86,074 wheels to 59 railway companies. Ganz also bought an English patent, the invention of Ransomes and Biddel, which concerned parts for rail switches. He improved this also, and got two patents in 1861 and in 1865. Between 1860 and 1866, his company delivered 6,293 crust cast rail switch parts to railway companies. The company did not only produce parts for railways. They also made parts for bridges (e.g. most of the Lánchíd's cast iron cross beams and the molding pieces of the Szeged Bridge in Szeged), as well as crust cast notched cylinders for the mill industry. Later the company achieved world-famous success with this product, under the leadership of András Mechwart.

The number of employees at Ganz Works was 60 in 1854, 106 in 1857 and 371 in 1867. The daily production was 2-3 tonnes of casts (with 50-60 wheels). The products of the company obtained international recognition: at the World's Fairs in Paris (three bronze medals Exposition Universelle (1855)), in London (bronze medaile 1862 International Exhibition) and, at the Swiss Industrywork Exhibition, a silver medal in 1867.

== Personal life ==
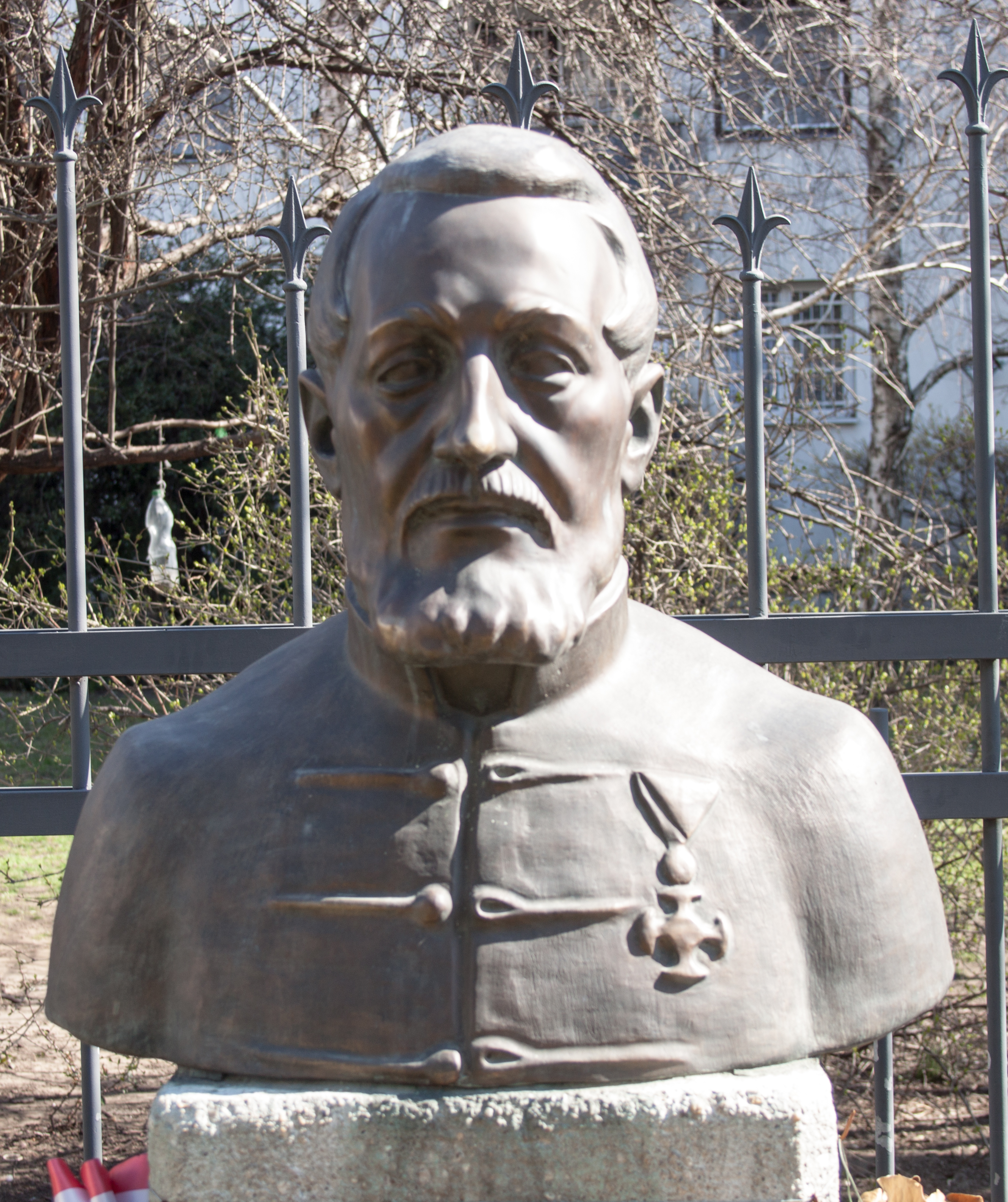
Statue of Ábrahám Ganz

On the 24 October 1849 he married Jozefa Heiss, the daughter of the city judge of Buda, Laurentius Heiss. They could not have their own children, so they adopted two related orphan girls, Anna Pospech and Jozefina Ganz.

He was nominated honorary citizen of Buda by the city council on 4 September 1863. In 1865 the emperor, Francis Joseph I, personally expressed his highest appreciation to Ábrahám Ganz. On the 23 November 1867 they celebrated the production of the hundredth wheel, made by chill casting, and Ganz gave a dinner for all his employees and their families. During his life he spent a lot of money for social purposes. In his company he uniquely opened a retirement fund and a patient fund.

He kept his Swiss citizenship. There is no evidence that he learned or could speak any Hungarian. He spoke with his family in German, and the employees of his factory spoke with him in German also.

== Death ==
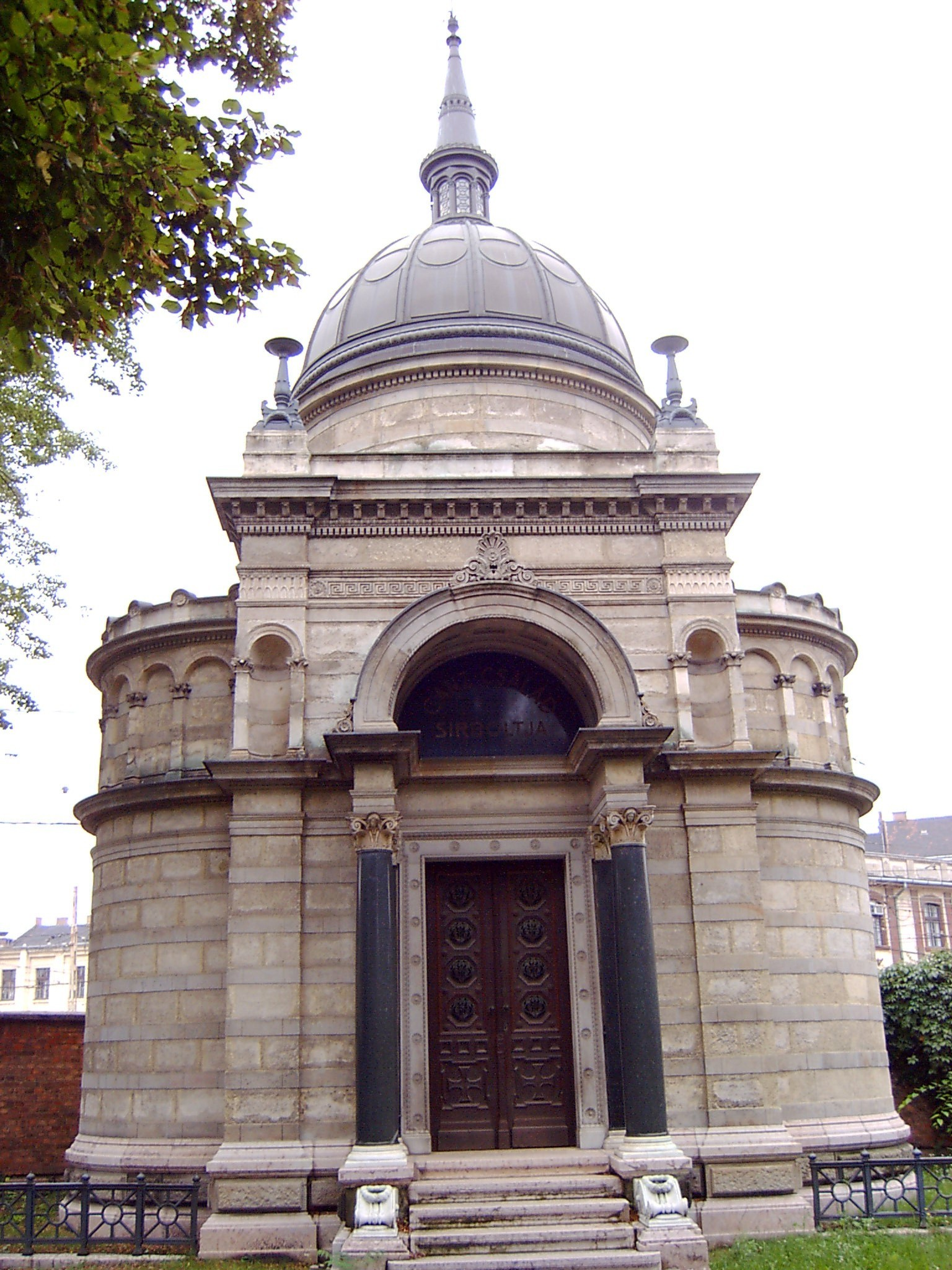
Tomb of Ábrahám Ganz

In his last years he worked a lot, but was not happy with his life. He saw all his brothers going crazy and he was convinced that he would have the same future. After the death of his brother, Konrád, he committed suicide on 15 December 1867. His ashes were buried in the Kerepesi Cemetery. In 1872, Miklós Ybl built him a mausoleum. After the death of his widow in 1913, they both lie there forever.

== Legacy ==
He is considered to be one of the pioneers of Hungarian heavy industry. With his works he contributed a lot to the development of the Hungarian casting and machine manufacturing industry.

After the death of Ábrahám Ganz, András Mechwart continued his plans and managed the company. With his leadership, under the name of Ganz & Co. Foundry and Machine Manufacturing Inc. (Ganz és Társa Vasöntöde és Gépgyártó Rt.), it became the most significant group of companies in Hungary. It was active in the machine, vehicle and electrical manufacturing industries with world-famous inventions and technical solutions.

In the original foundry production stopped in 1964 and the building, with all the objects left, became the Foundry Museum (Öntödei Múzeum). The building is, since 1997, under monument protection.

== See also ==
- Anton Eichleiter

== Literature ==
- Terplán, Zénó (translated from the original German biography of Antal Eichleiter): Ki vezette a gyárat Ganz Ábrahám (1814–1867) halála után? (Who lead the factory after the death of Ábrahám Ganz?)
