= Millenáris (park) =

Park and venue in Budapest, Hungary

Coordinates: 47°30′41″N 19°01′29″E

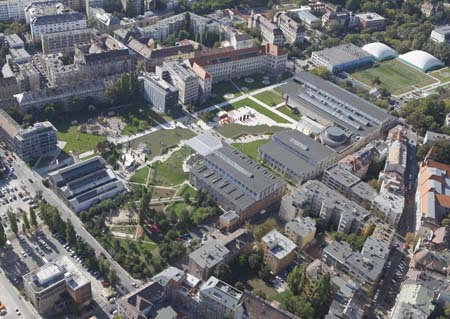
A bird's eye view of the park

Millenáris, formally Millenáris Park, is an exhibition space, function venue, and park in the 2nd district of Budapest. Opened in 2001, the park is a former industrial estate converted into a cultural and leisure centre. It regularly displays exhibitions and shows relating to the cultural values and lifestyle of Budapest and Europe. Its six acres of park and cultural centre have also hosted public interest and business events.

The area is reconstructed from the former Ganz Works foundry complex and pieces of machinery used are still on display. The architectural design of Millenáris received the Europa Nostra Award in 2002 for the redevelopment of the area.

== History ==
=== Ganz Works foundry ===
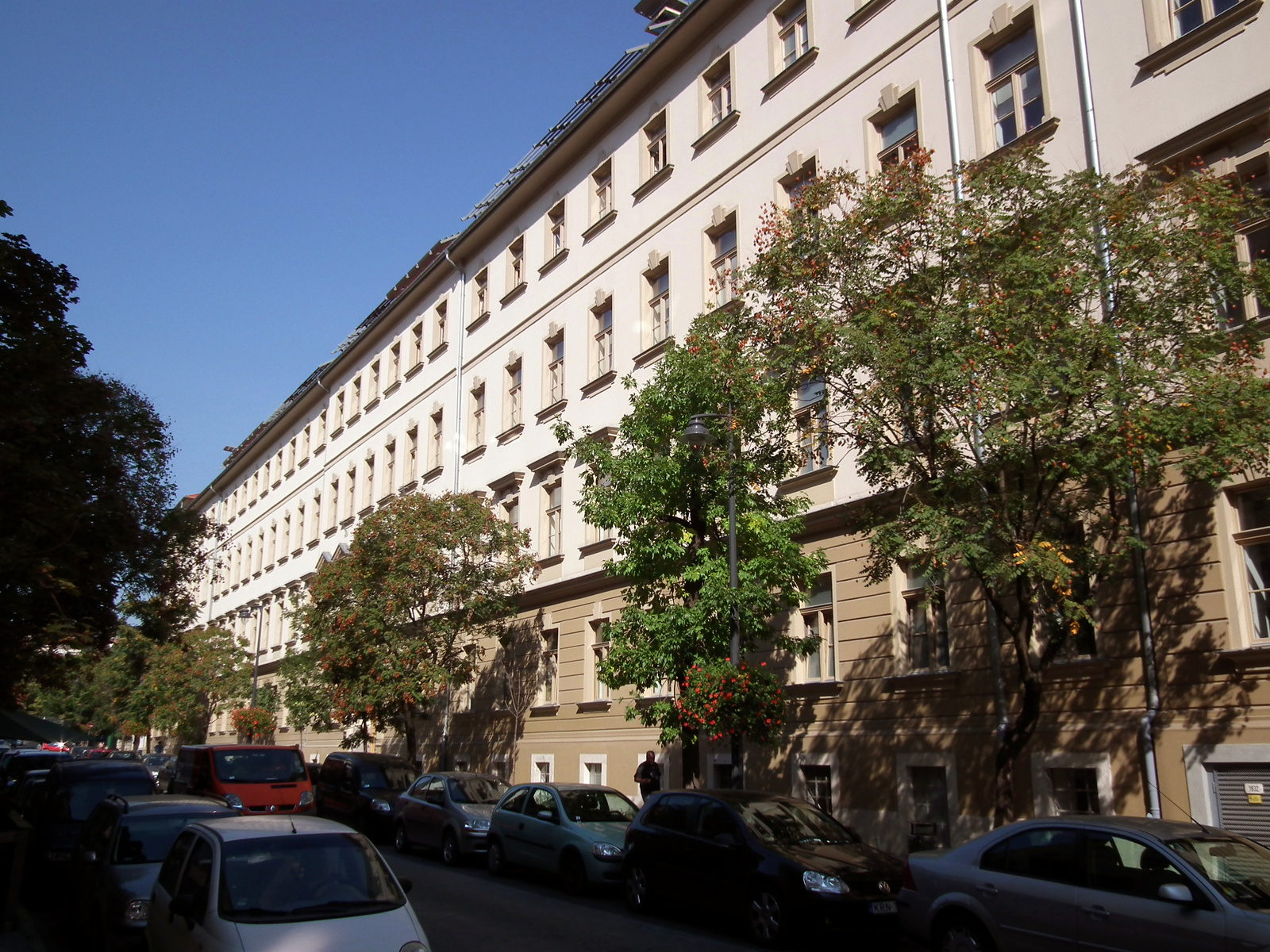
Building A, the central office building of the former Ganz Electricity Works

Abraham Ganz founded the Ganz Works foundry in Buda in 1844, where the Foundry Museum stands today. The small plant grew into a major mechanical engineering company in one year. After Ganz's death, the factory was further developed by András Mechwart, a mechanical engineer. In 1878, Mechwart established the electricity department within the framework of Ganz és Társa Vasöntő és Gépgyár Rt. The workshop was first developed into a plant in one of the courtyard buildings on Kacsa Street in the 2nd district, and then into the former Király-malom main street building.

The Ganz factory soon became known worldwide for its production of electrical systems, and its electrical products and equipment became one of the world market leaders for two decades. The building on Lövőház Street, the then world-class electrical engineering factory, was built in 1897, where more than two thousand people worked at that time. In 1906, the factory became independent and operated under the name of Ganz Electricity Co. until 1929, when it suffered severely from the competition by its international rivals. Meanwhile, in 1911–12, a large assembly line was built, which secured its place as a future monument of national industrial and cultural-historical heritage.

Ganz achieved further recognition and success as a leading company in domestic electrification, which started in the 1920s. Thanks to its successful modernization efforts, the company also experienced a brief return to international prominence. It emerged from the crisis through the Kanto-system locomotives of large-scale electrification, Ratkovszky's voltage regulators, and various Jendrassik engines and turbines. However, this renewed success was cut short by World War II.

After World War II, the factory was eventually rebuilt and became independent again in 1949 under the name Ganz Electricity Factory. After experiencing numerous organizational changes, its name was shortened to Ganz Electricity Works in 1963. The large company was producing for an increasingly narrow market, and it was significantly hindered by the lack of substantial developments, although it still retained some of its reputation with competitive products in the international market. The slowdown in in-house development, the gradual lag behind the world standard, then the decline in efficiency, and last but not least, market reorganization put the company in crisis.

The establishment of Ganz Ansaldo Villamossági Rt with the involvement of foreign capital in 1991 provided a temporary solution, but the production gradually decreased, and then the relocation of the Budapest factory to the countryside began. The electricity company continued to operate under the name Ganz Transelektro Rt. from 2000. At the same time, work began on the former central factory to create Millennium Park.

=== The renovation ===
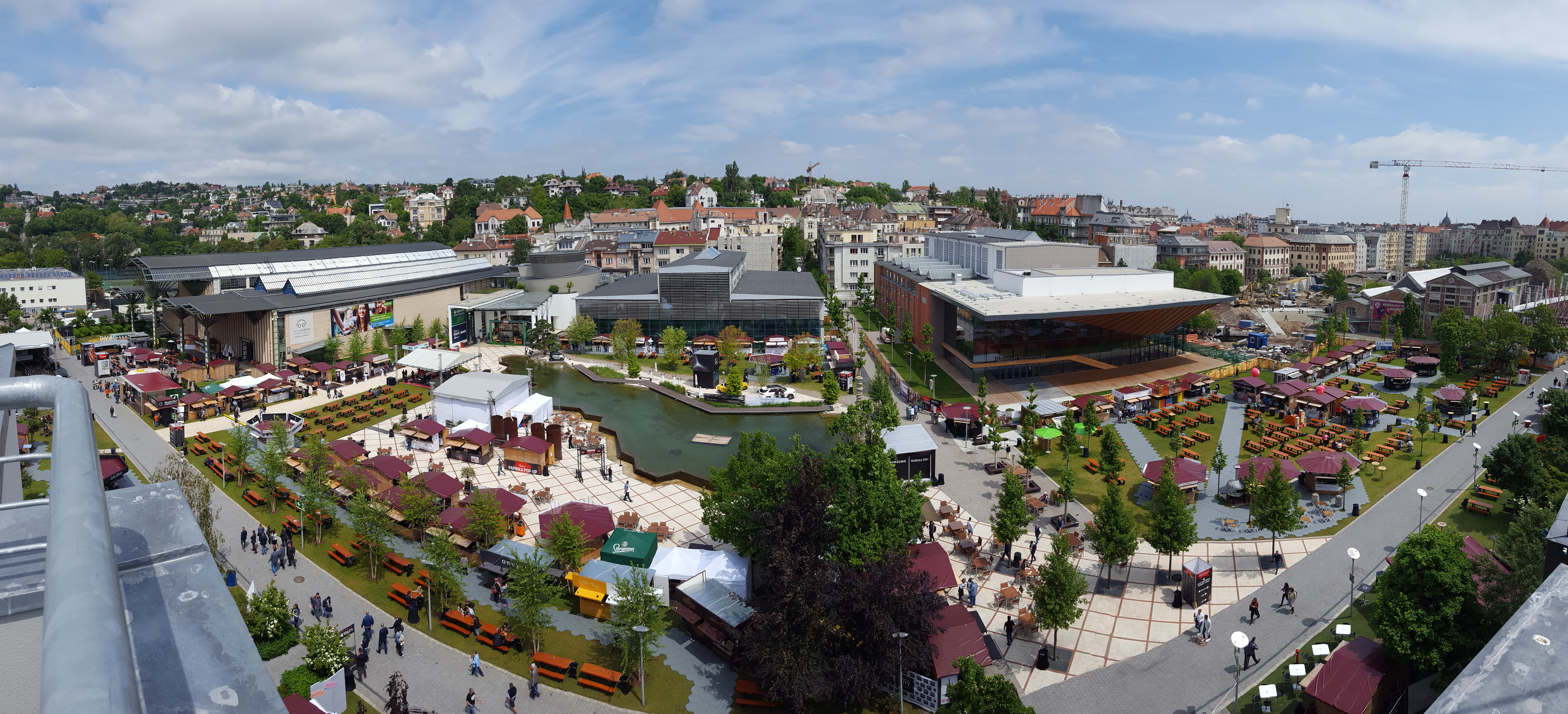
A bird's eye view of the Park in 2019

The basic principle of the redevelopment of the Ganz site was to transform the valuable and preservable buildings and parts of buildings into a modern exhibition and event centre for the public. One of the most difficult tasks of the conceptual design was the selection of the buildings to be retained and demolished, the definition of attractive proportions and space configurations. The result was the demolition of two high-rise buildings, which were the least desirable from the point of view of the revitalisation of the area.

The demolition work of the unneeded factory sections began on 12 August 2000 and by 25 September, six demolitions had been carried out, including the demolition of two 37 m high, 126 m long industrial buildings and the chimney. Prior to demolition, tens of thousands of litres of oil had to be removed in accordance with environmental regulations. The demolition works generated a total of approximately 120 000 cubic metres of demolition debris, which included the removal of 2.5–3,000 tonnes of steel structures.

The retained historic Building B (Great Hall), Building D, the new entrance Building C built between them and the underground car park under the park, now form elements of one of the largest exhibition halls in the country.

The assembly hall E (formerly the Theatre), now the National Dance Theatre, has also been preserved.

At the main entrance on Light Street is the Reception Building G, which serves a variety of service and catering functions, as well as hosting professional and other events related to the exhibition and events programme.

== Former facilities / exhibitions of the Millenáris ==
=== Dreamers of Dreams ===
The exhibition "Dreamers of Dreams - Hungarians Speaking to the World" presented outstanding personalities and inventions of Hungarian science, industry, technology, art and culture between 2001 and 2002.

=== House of the Future exhibition ===
Between 2005 and 2007, the exhibition was spread over two levels, covering 3,000 square meters, with changing and rotating exhibits from time to time.

=== Palace of Wonders ===
The Palace of Wonders is an exhibition series that started in 1994 and was operated between 2005 and 2012.
