= Anton Eichleiter =

German iron manufacturer (1831–1902)

Antal Eichleiter
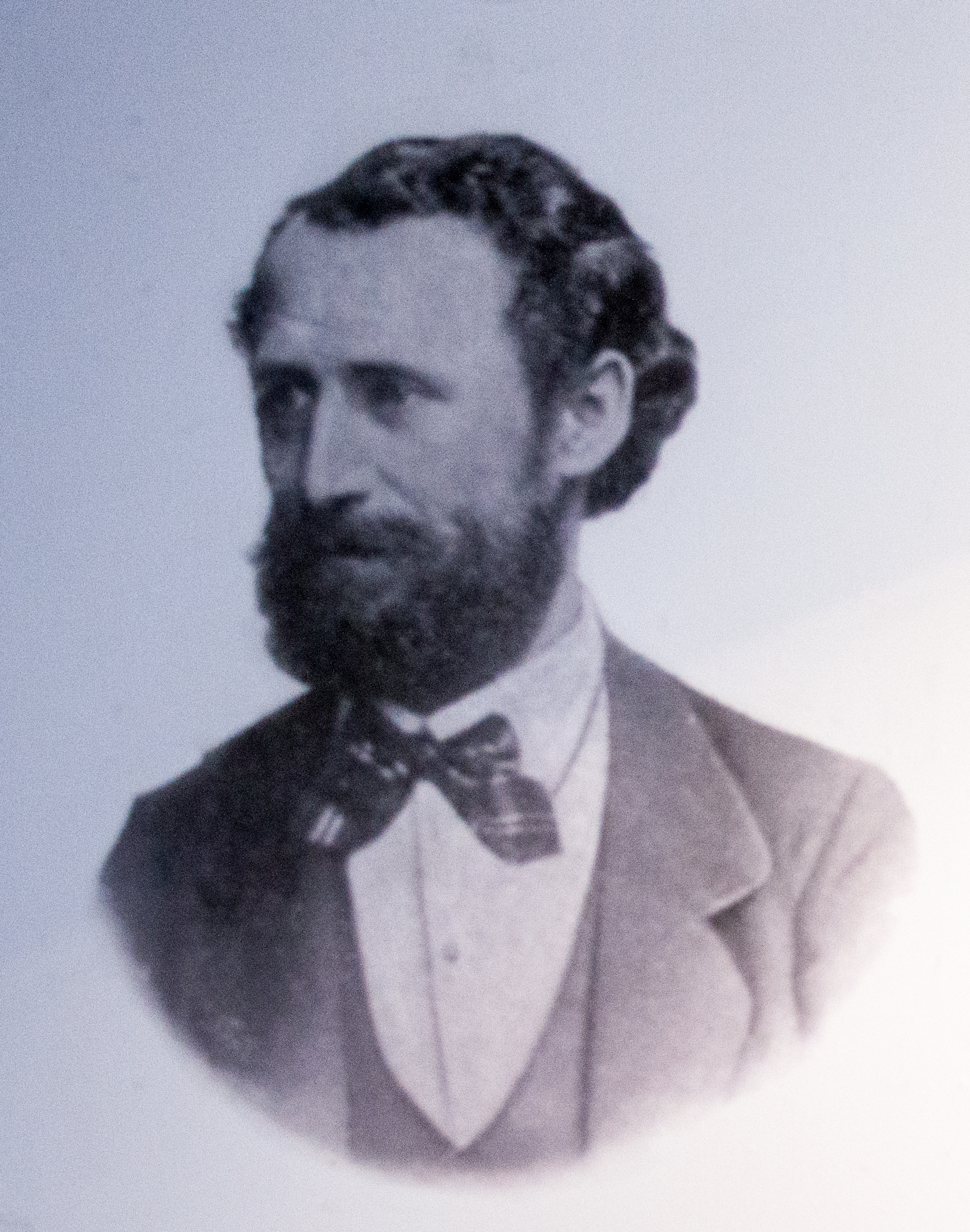
- Born: Anton Eichleiter; 1 March 1831; Augsburg, Bavaria
- Died: 31 May 1902 (aged 71); Rorschach, Canton of St. Gallen, Switzerland
- Education: Gymnasium bei St. Anna, Augsburg; Polytechnikum of Augsburg, Augsburg
- Spouse: Doris Wundsch
- Children: Friederike; Hermann; Emil; Anna; Julius; Bernhard; Fritz
- Parent(s): Andreas Eichleiter; Caroline Steinhard
- Engineering career
- Institutions: Thuringian Railways (Thüringer Bahn); Cramer-Klett (today MAN SE); Ganz Works

Anton Eichleiter (Hungarian: Eichleiter Antal, Augsburg, 1 March 1831 – Rorschach, 31 May 1902) was a German iron manufacturer and manager of the Ganz Works.

== Life ==
=== Early years ===
Eichleiter was born to a family originating from Augsburg. His parents were Andreas Eichleiter, teacher in the Lutheran Gymnasium bei St. Anna, and Caroline Steinhard, daughter of a Lutheran priest. Eichleiter had eight siblings of whom three died in an early age and after his mother's death his father had to take care of them. After primary school, he went to an industrial and agricultural vocational school in Augsburg; from there, he studied at the Polytechnikum (today the Augsburg University of Applied Sciences).

=== Budapest, Hungary ===
After finishing his studies, he worked first as a locksmith then as a technical drawer in Erfurt, Thuringia at the main workshop of the Thüringer Bahn. In 1854, he was employed by the Cramer-Klett (predecessor of MAN SE) where he was commissioned to hand over the produced wagons to the 'Tisza Railway' (Tiszai Vasút) company in Szolnok, Austria-Hungary. The wheels of these wagons were delivered by the Ganz Works based in Buda, Austria-Hungary. He met the Swiss-born Hungarian industrialist Ábrahám Ganz (creater of the Ganz Works) there who offered him a job in his foundry. His first project was to create a new, bigger workshop. He designed the one-piece chill cast peak inserts to the railway crossings. Beside his planner job, he managed the correspondence with different railway companies.

One day his long time friend, András Mechwart visited him in Buda. Ábrahám Ganz offered Mechwart as well a job in his factory which he accepted. Mechwart was also a brother-in-law of Eichleiter through his sister Luise.

Before his death, Ganz met with Eichleiter, Ulrich Keller and Mechwart to discuss a secret agreement that stated, in the event of Ganz's unexpected death, Eichleiter would become the head of the company. Also in that agreement, Eichleiter would get 22% of the shares, Keller would get 10%, and Mechwart 8%; Ganz's heirs living in Switzerland would get the majority left over (60%) of the shares, all under the condition that those involved could not sell the company to outsiders for ten years. After Ganz's death in 1867, Eichleiter, Mechwart, and Keller became the managers of the Ganz Works and changed the name of the company to 'Ganz & Co.' (Ganz és Társa). After two years, Ganz's heirs sold the company to Eichleiter, Keller, and Mechwart. They changed the name again in 1869, this time to 'Ganz & Co. Foundry & Machine Factory Inc.'(Ganz és Társa Vasöntő és Gépgyár Rt.) In 1873, Eichleiter and Keller left and sold their shares, leaving Mechwart as the head of the company.

Eichleiter was a board member of the 'Pest-Buda Beauty Committee' (Pest-Buda Szépészeti Bizottság) which served as an architectural judging association, being nominated to the position by the Hungarian government. He was also a member of the economic council of the Budapest-based 'First Hungarian Wagon Factory Inc.' (Első Magyar Vasútikocsigyár Rt.), a technical advisor in a cornstarch-producing company, and in the Salgótarján, Austria-Hungary-based 'Salgótarján Coal Mine Ltd.' (Salgótarjáni Szénbányamű). Eichleiter was also an inspector and board member of the 'Commercial Bank of Buda' (Budai Kereskedelmi Bank).

Later, he became member of the exhibition committee of the World's Fair in Vienna in 1873, then correspondent and juror at the metal and machine department of the exhibition. He was awarded the Order of Franz Joseph by the Austro-Hungarian emperor, Franz Joseph for his efforts in the industry development on the World's Fair. He was also honored by the Turkish sultan Abdulaziz with the 'Medjedich Orden'.

=== Switzerland ===
At some point, Eichleiter began suffering from acute gastritis and depression due to his work, leading him to travel to Thusis in Switzerland to relax. He soon decided to move to Rorschach am Bodensee, Swtizerland where he bought the 'Weinhalde Villa'.

In 1871 or 1872, he co-financed, designed, and help build the establishment of a new girls' school in the Canton of St. Gallen. He supported a lot of charity projects in Rorschach in areas such as theatre, gymnastics association, and well drilling for the public.

In 1879, he became school counselor and later the head of the school council. He also gained Swiss citizenship and became an honorary citizen of Rorschach.

In 1887, the Swiss parliament wanted to pass a new federal patent law that had been repeatedly rejected in referendums despite it being implemted in other nations, causing Swiss intellectual property to be stolen more frequently. In response, local patent committees were formed by different communtiies, and Eichleiter became the president of the Canton of St. Gallen's committee. He was then made a member of the federal committee in Bern that reviewed patent cases across Switzerland. In this role, he helped draft and lobby for stronger patent law, helping the new law pass in parliament and among voters.

After the last of his children left the home, Eichleiter sold his Swiss house and moved to Munich, Bavaria. Eichleiter died on 31 May 1902 in Canton of St. Gallen.

=== Personal life ===
On 9 June 1956 he married Doris Wundsch, daughter of a Lutheran priest of Erfurt. Their first child, Friederike was born on 24 June 1857. The couple's following children, Hermann and Emil, both died at a young age. Their daughter Anna was born in 1864, followed by Julius (1866), Bernhard (1867), and Fritz (1869).

Eichleiter's sister Friederike was the wife Julius Gulden. Eichleiter had tried to get Ganz to hire Gulden as a mechanical engineer in the Ganz Works. Gulden's professional field was in turbine construction.
