= Csonka =

Csonka may refer to:

- Csonka (surname), people with this name, including:
- Csonka (automobile), a Hungarian automobile manufactured by János Csonka in Budapest from 1909 to 1912
- 131762 Csonka, a main-belt minor planet
