= Csonka (surname) =

Csonka is a Hungarian surname. Notable people with the surname include:

- Ferenc Csonka (fl. 1950s), Hungarian sprint canoer
- János Csonka (1852–1939), Hungarian engineer
- Larry Csonka (born 1946), American football player
- Larry Csonka, American wrestling journalist
- Paul Csonka (1905–1995), Austrian composer and opera conductor
- Zsófia Csonka (born 1983), Hungarian sport-shooter

== See also ==
- Csonka (disambiguation)
- Zonca
