= Zonca (surname) =

Zonca is a surname of Italian origin.

Notable people with it are:

- Christine GZ (Christine Giampaoli Zonca; born 1993), Italian-Spanish rally and off-road race driver
- Craig Zonca (born 1984), Australian radio and television presenter
- Erick Zonca (born 1956), French film director and screenwriter
- Vittorio Zonca (1568–1603), Italian engineer and writer

== See also ==
- Zonca (cycling team)
- Csonka (surname)
