= Csonka (automobile) =

Hungarian automobile manufactured 1909–1912

The Csonka was a Hungarian automobile manufactured by János Csonka (1852–1939) in Budapest from 1909 until 1912.

Csonka had previously designed some small vans which had been made by the large Ganz company but in 1909 he set out on his own and made a few one-off cars. In 1909 the first series production car was introduced which had a single-cylinder engine and was the first Hungarian car to have shaft drive. This was followed in 1911 by a larger 8 hp water-cooled model. Fourteen were made. Most cars were built with two-seater bodies and circular radiators.

Csonka left car making in 1912 and returned to working at Budapest Technical University. Based on the patent of Karl Benz, in 1893 Csonka and his colleague Donát Bánki improved and developed the world's first modern carburetor.

== Gallery ==
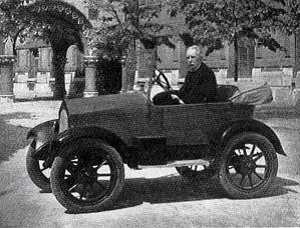
1909 roadster

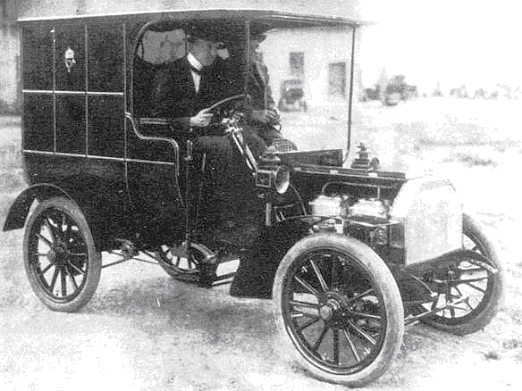
1910 panel truck

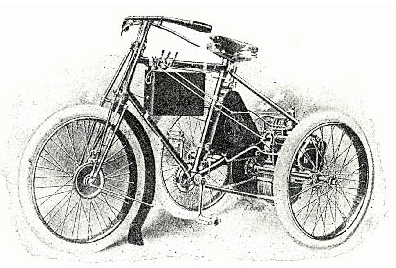
1900 motorized tricycle

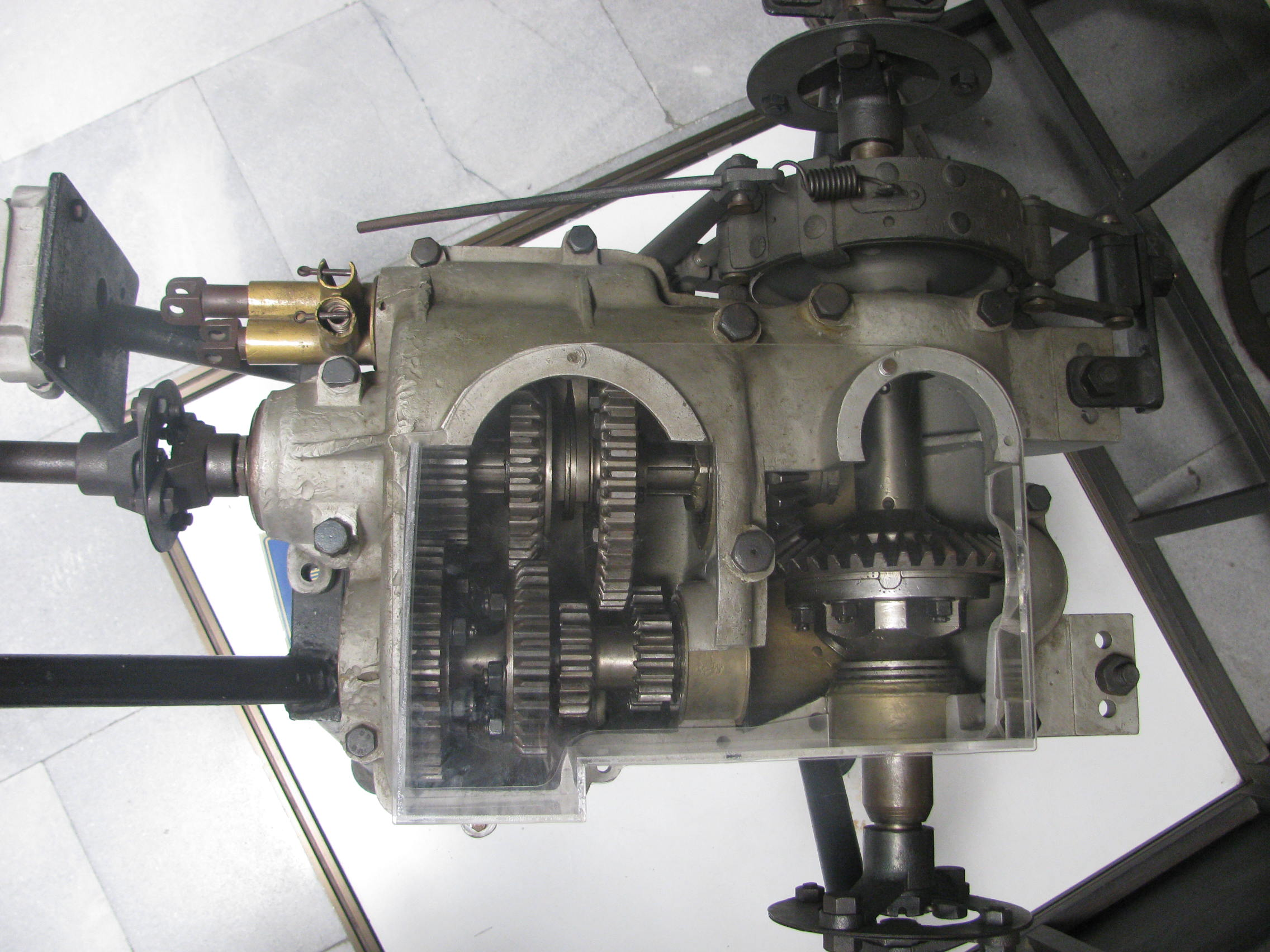
1908 transaxle
