= Bakonybánk =

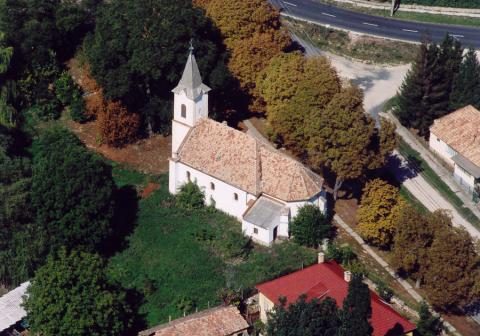
- Church of Saint Bartholomew

- Coat of arms

- Location of Bakonybánk
- Coordinates: 47.46548°N 17.90243°E
- Country: Hungary
- County: Komárom-Esztergom

Area
  - Total: 15.07 km^{2} (5.82 sq mi)

Population (2004)
  - Total: 522
  - Density: 34.63/km^{2} (89.7/sq mi)
- Time zone: UTC+1 (CET)
  - Summer (DST): UTC+2 (CEST)
- Postal code: 2885
- Area code: 34
- Website: http://bakonybank.hu/

Bakonybánk is a village in Komárom-Esztergom county, Hungary.

In the 19th and 20th centuries, a small Jewish community lived in the village (in 1880 61 Jews lived in the village). However, most of the village's Jews were murdered in the Holocaust. The community had a Jewish cemetery.

== Personalities ==
- Donát Bánki, the co-inventor of the carburetor for the stationary engine, was born here in 1859
