= Zonca =

Zonca may refer to:

- Zonca (cycling team)
- Zonca (surname)
