= Technical University of Applied Sciences Augsburg =

Public university in Augsburg, Germany

- Technische Hochschule Augsburg
- Motto: Sought-after personalities
- Type: Public
- Established: 1971; 55 years ago
- Budget: €37.2 million (2023)
- President: Prof. Dr. Dr. h.c. Gordon Thomas Rohrmair
- Academic staff: 185 professors 551 (other academic staff)
- Administrative staff: 298
- Students: 7,061 (WS 2023/2024)
- Location: An der Hochschule 1, Augsburg, Bayern, 86161, Germany; 48.149°N 11.567°E
- Campus: Urban
- Colors: Dark Pink, White
- Website: tha.de

Logo until November 2023

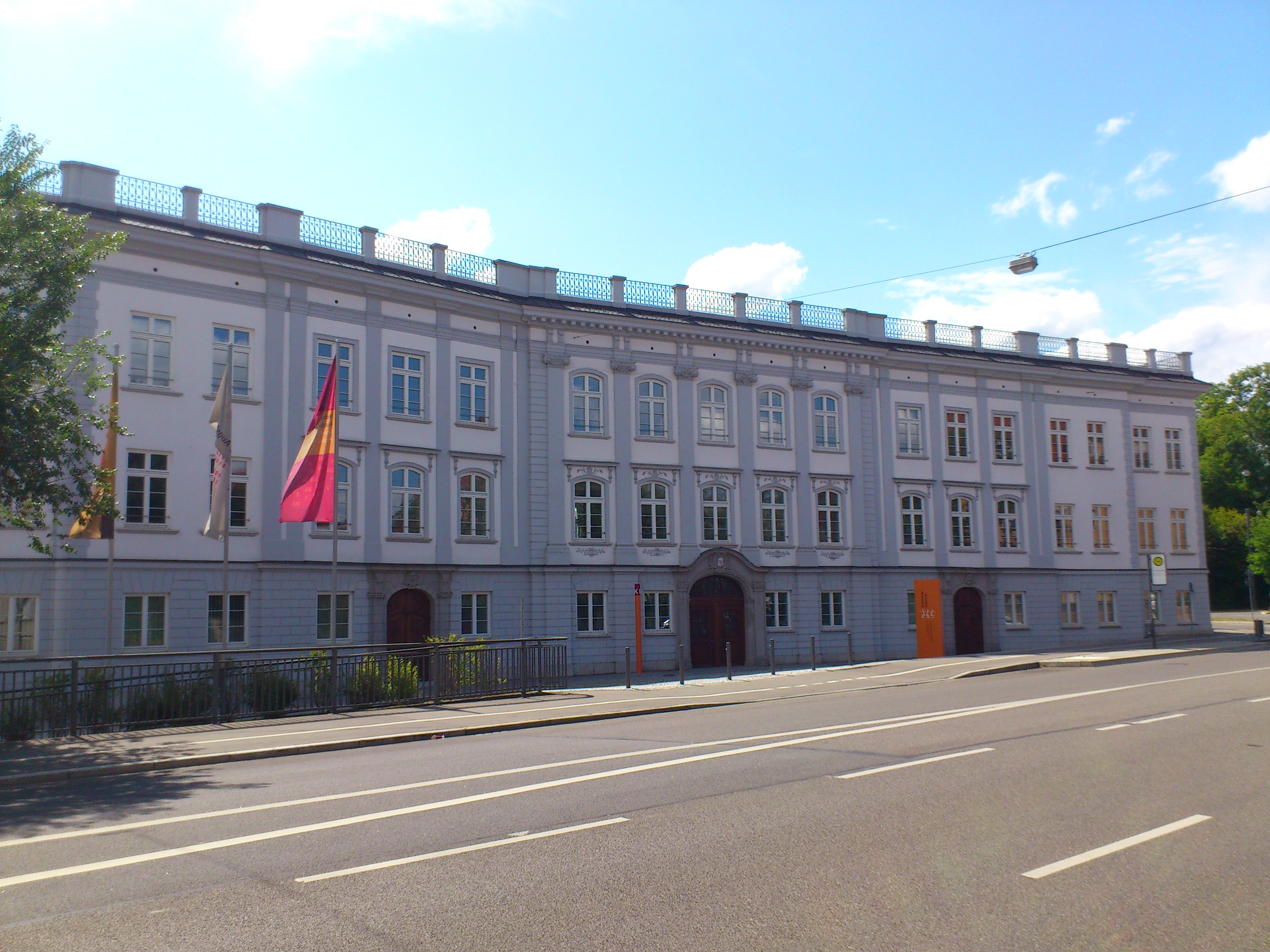
Technical University of Applied Sciences Augsburg (building K)

Technical University of Applied Sciences Augsburg (German: Technische Hochschule Augsburg or simply THA) is a public university located in Augsburg, Germany. It was founded in 1971, but its institutional roots as an academy of arts date back to 1670. With more than 7,000 students it is one of the largest institutions of its kind in Bavaria. 185 professors as well as 408 lecturers in 7 faculties are employed in the university. Currently, 23 undergraduate and 22 graduate degree programmes are offered.

It hosts the Bibliotheca Augustana website, which features a catalogue of electronic texts.

== Faculties ==
- Faculty of Liberal Arts and Sciences
- Faculty of Architecture and Civil Engineering
- Faculty of Electrical Engineering
- Faculty of Design
- Faculty of Computer Science
- Faculty of Mechanical and Process Engineering
- School of Business

== History ==
The first institution associated with the university, the 'Reichsstädtische Kunstakademie Augsburg', was founded in 1710. In 1833, the Royal Polytechnic School was founded, the forerunner of today's engineering faculties. Other institutions such as the Royal Industrial School, the Augsburg Rudolf Diesel School of Building and Engineering (Academy for Applied Technology) and the Augsburg School of Art and Design can be mentioned as roots of the university. In 1971, the university was officially founded with a Faculty of Design and a Faculty of Engineering. The other faculties and institutes followed as the university expanded to its current size.

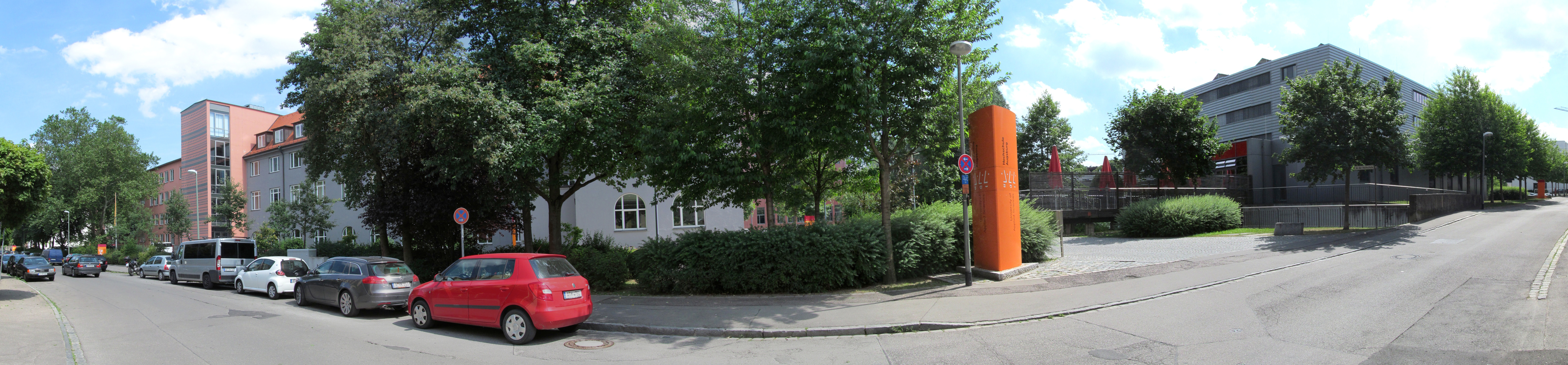
Panorama Picture from Technical University of Applied Sciences Augsburg (Campus Brunnenlechgäßchen)

In July 2022, the Bavarian Minister President Markus Söder awarded the then University of Applied Sciences Augsburg the title of "Technical University" in recognition of its scientific achievements in the technical field. At the start of the 2023 summer semester, the university was officially renamed Technical University of Applied Sciences Augsburg.

== Campuses ==
The university has two main sites, centrally located in Augsburg and 500 metres apart from each other.

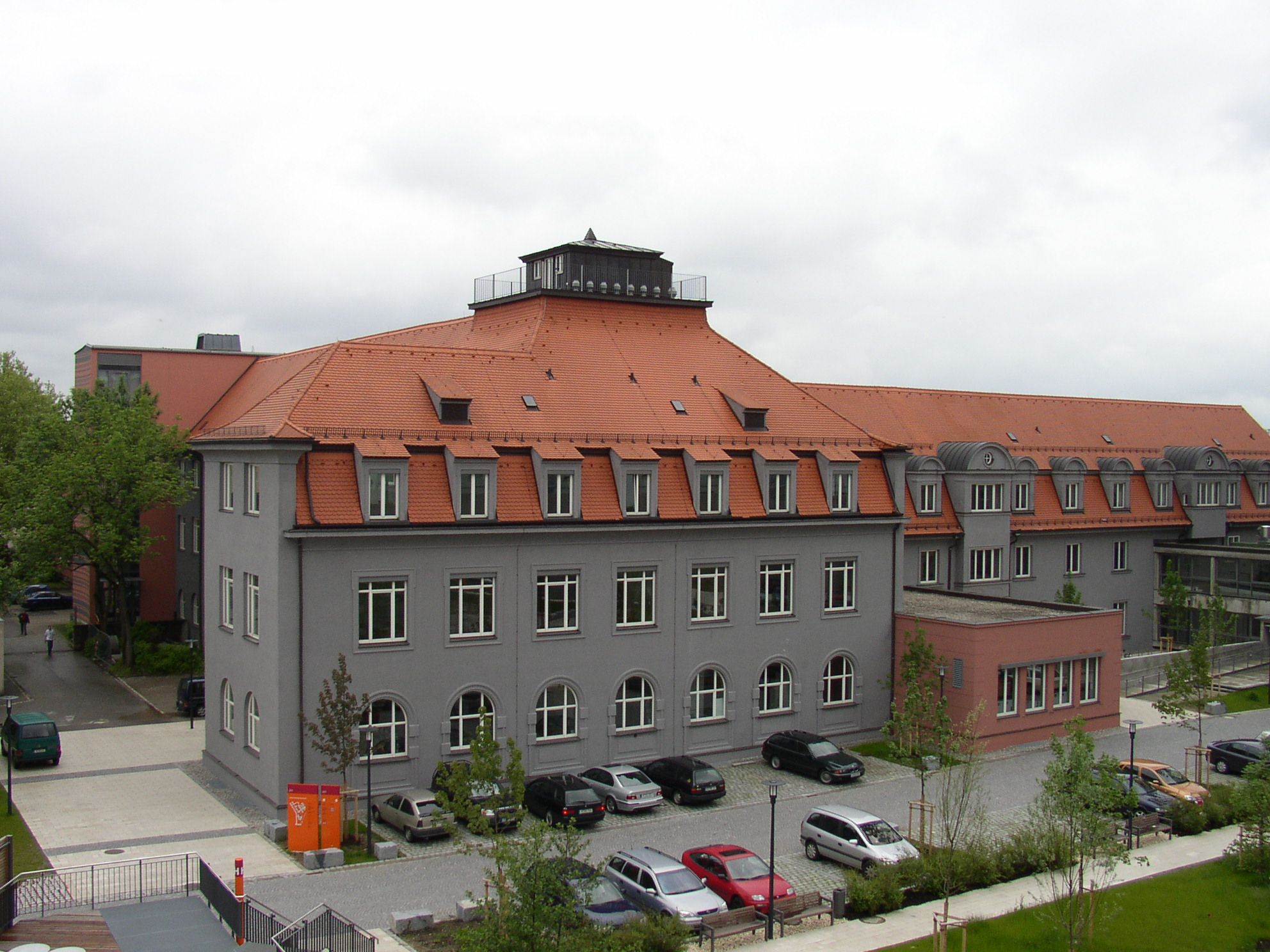
Brunnenlech campus

The Brunnenlech Campus (buildings A to H), located between Brunnenlechgässchen and Baumgartnerstrasse, houses the Faculty of Architecture and Civil Engineering, the Faculty of Electrical Engineering, the Faculty of Liberal Arts and Sciences and the Faculty of Mechanical and Process Engineering. The administration, library and computer centre are also located on the Brunnenlech campus.

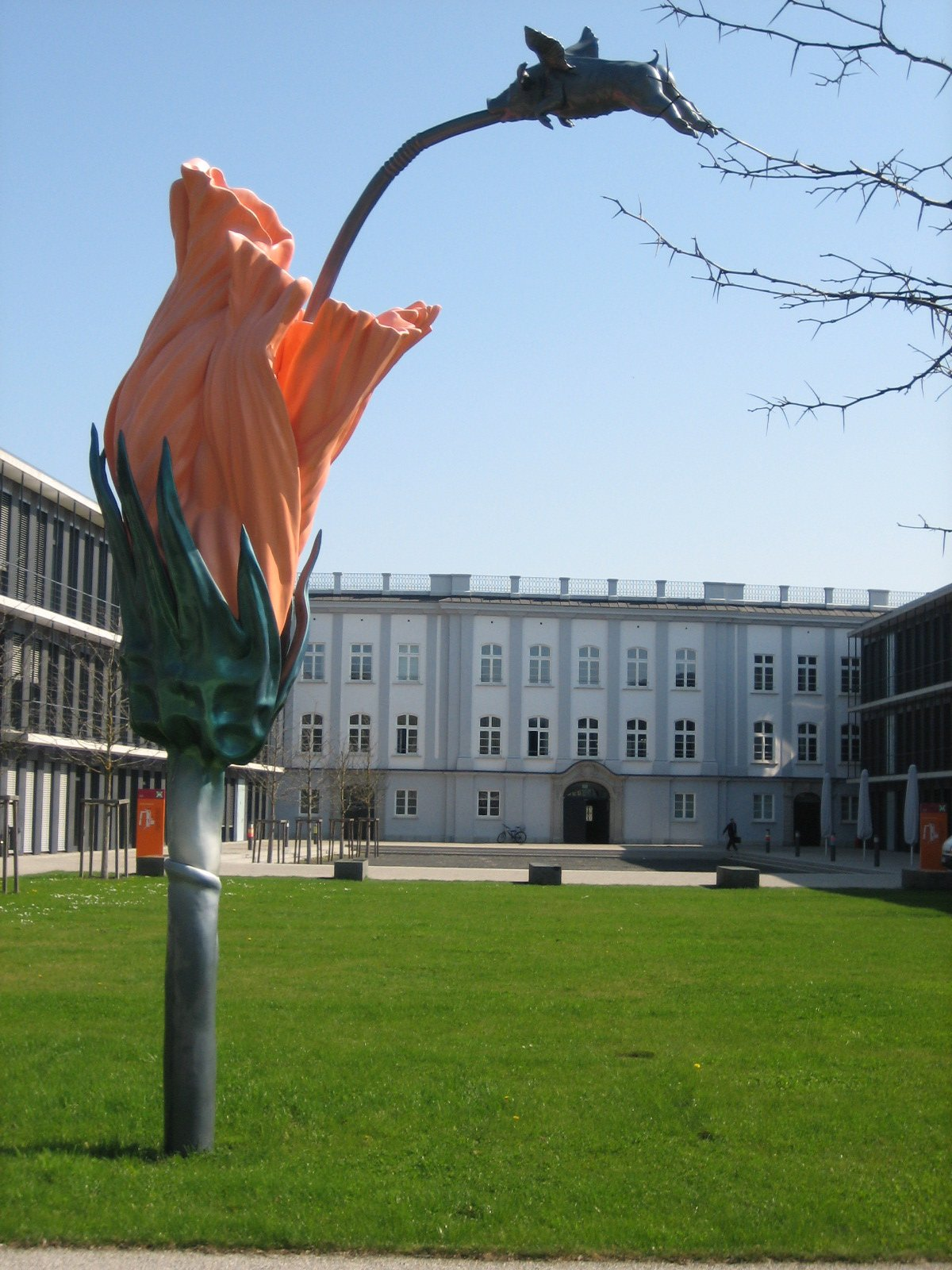
Red Gate campus

The Red Gate Campus (buildings J to M and W), located along Friedberger Straße, houses the Faculty of Computer Science, the Faculty of Design, the School of Business, as well as the President's and Public Relations offices.

== See also ==
- Fachhochschule
