= Donát Bánki =

Hungarian mechanical engineer (1859–1922)

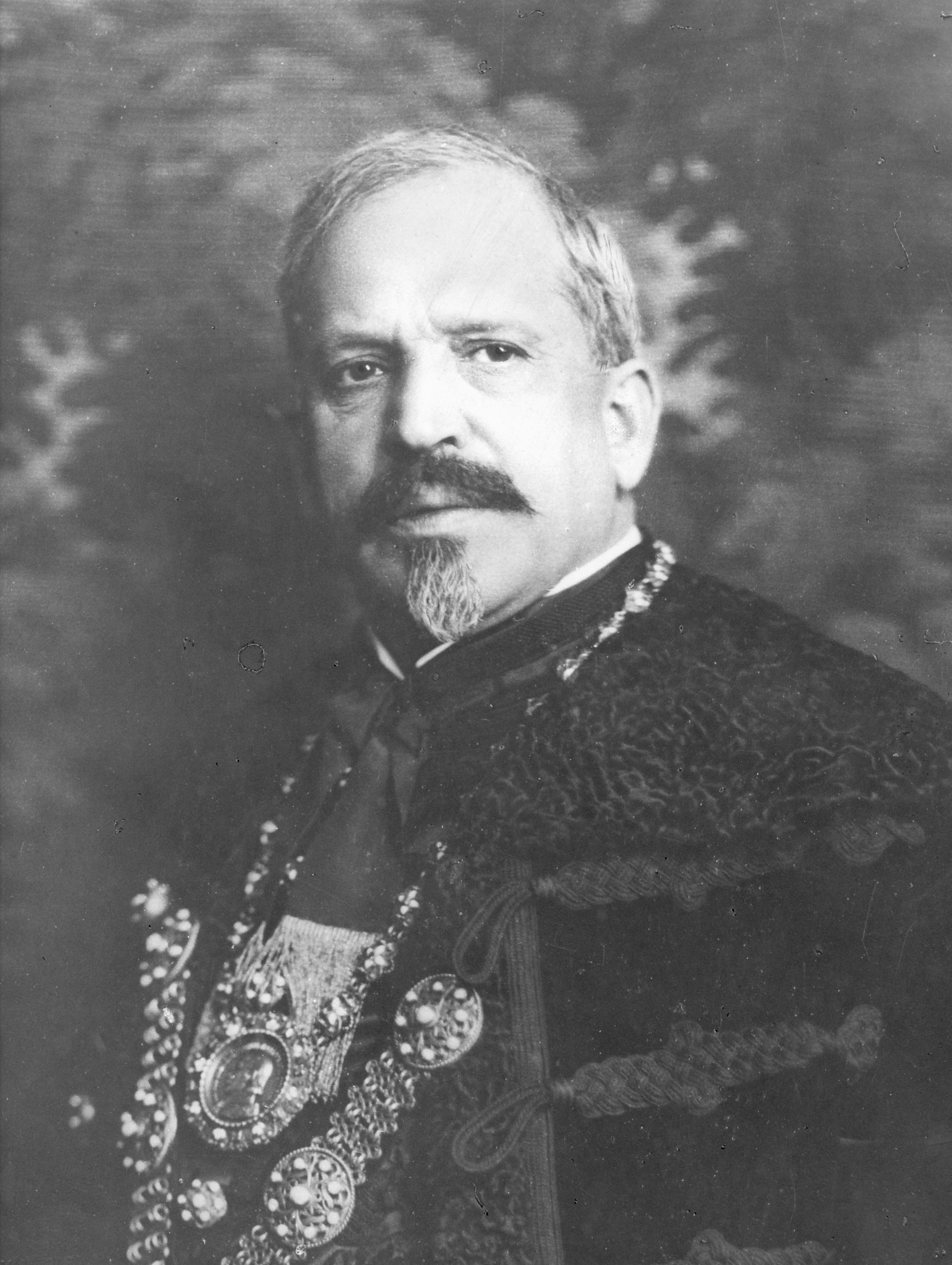
- Born: Donát Lőwinger; 6 June 1859; Bakonybánk, Kingdom of Hungary, Austrian Empire
- Died: 1 August 1922 (aged 63); Budapest, Kingdom of Hungary
- Education: Budapest University of Technology and Economics
- Occupations: inventor, mechanical engineer

Donát Bánki (born as Donát Lőwinger, 6 June 1859 – 1 August 1922) was a Hungarian mechanical engineer and inventor of Jewish heritage. In 1893 he invented the carburetor for the stationary engine, together with János Csonka (known as the Bánki-Csonka engine). The invention is often, incorrectly credited to the German Wilhelm Maybach, who submitted his patent half a year after Bánki and Csonka. Bánki also greatly contributed to the design of compressors for combustion engines.

In 1898, Donát Bánki invented the high-compression engine with a dual carburetor, an evaporation method used ever since.

The invention of the carburetor helped the development of automobiles, as previously no method was known to correctly mix the fuel and air for engines.

Some sources say that the idea of the carburetor came from a flower girl. One evening, Bánki saw her while walking home from the Budapest Technical University. She was sprinkling water onto her flowers by blowing spray from her mouth.

Bánki is also given partial credit for the invention of the crossflow turbine.
