= Chill (casting) =

A chill is an object used to promote solidification in a specific portion of a metal casting mould. Normally the metal in the mould cools at a certain rate relative to thickness of the casting. When the geometry of the moulding cavity prevents directional solidification from occurring naturally, a chill can be strategically placed to help promote it. There are two types of chills: internal and external chills.

== Types ==
Internal chills are pieces of metal that are placed inside the moulding cavity. When the cavity is filled, part of the chill will melt and ultimately become part of the casting, thus the chill must be the same material as the casting. Note that internal chills will absorb both heat capacity and heat of fusion energy.

External chills are masses of material that have a high heat capacity and thermal conductivity. They are placed on the edge of the moulding cavity, and effectively become part of the wall of the moulding cavity. This type of chill can be used to increase the feeding distance of a riser or reduce the number of risers required.

== Materials ==
Chills can be made of many materials, including iron, copper, bronze, aluminium, graphite, and silicon carbide. Other sand materials with higher densities, thermal conductivity or thermal capacity can also be used as a chill. For example, chromite sand or zircon sand can be used when molding with silica sand.
