= János Csonka =

Hungarian engineer and inventor

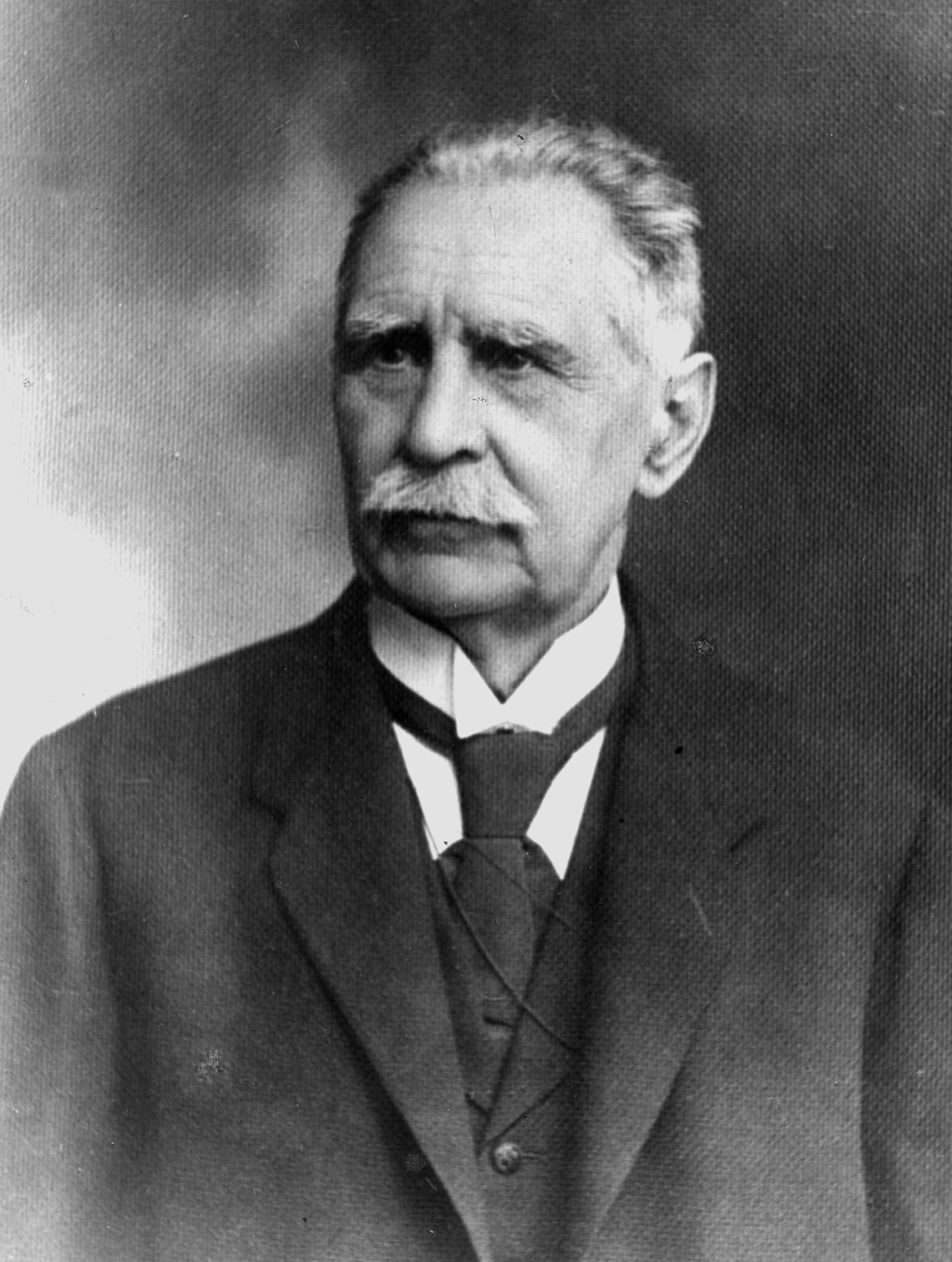
Csonka János.

János Csonka (22 January 1852 in Szeged – 27 October 1939 in Budapest) was a Hungarian engineer, the co-inventor of the carburetor for the stationary engine with Donát Bánki, patented on 13 February 1893.

== Life ==
Csonka, self-educated in many fields, had no university degree, but became one of the greatest figures of Hungarian engineering industry, and with the carburetor he has heavily contributed to technical development in the world. He studied the Lenoir motor in Paris in 1874 and there he recognized the prospects of the internal combustion engine. He became head of the training workshop at the Technical University of Budapest at the age of 25 where he employed skilled workers at his own expense, which allowed him to use the workshop for his experiments. Csonka retired at the age of 73 and filed his last patent application at the age of 84.

== Inventions ==
As the head of the workshop in 1879, Csonka invented the first Hungarian gas engine, several other engines and vehicles, including the first motor tricycle and postal automobile of the Hungarian Post, which were used for decades. In the 1890s, together with Donát Bánki, they produced the Bánki-Csonka engine and the first Hungarian motorcycle and motor-boat.
