= Economy of the Habsburg monarchy =

Habsburg monarchy in 1789

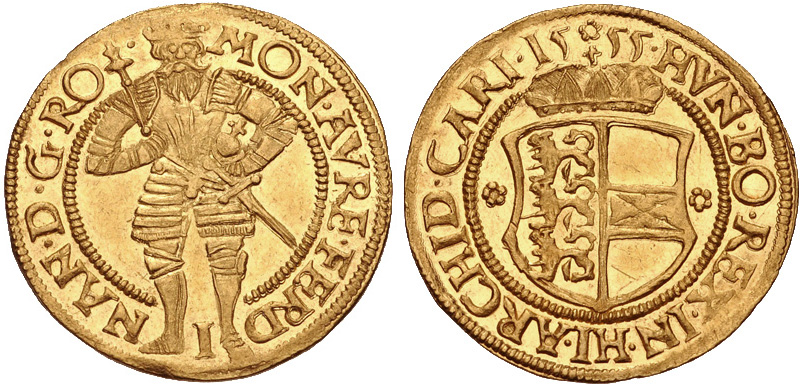
Golden ducat of Ferdinand I, minted in Klagenfurt (1555)

Economy of the Habsburg monarchy refers to economic development and financial policies of the Habsburg monarchy, until the creation of the Austrian Empire in 1804. Central state institution, that oversaw economic and financial affairs in Habsburg lands, was the Court Chamber (German: Hofkammer), also known as the Aulic Chamber (Latin: Camera Aulica), formed in 1527 by Ferdinand I, and centered in Vienna.

== History ==
With the abolition of serfdom in the 18th century, the Habsburg monarchy, with the major industrial, mining areas and forestry of regions Moravia and Bohemia leading the way, began to experience unprecedented economic growth. Beginning in 1841 per capita annual growth in the Habsburg monarchy approached 3.6 percent, a number rivaling that of neighboring Germany. While this growth was rapid and astonishing, it was not sustained.

Austria started experiencing its first sustained industrial development in the 1820s. Despite not being part of Prussia's Zollverein, Austrian production of pig iron, coal, cotton textiles, woolens and foodstuffs was growing faster than in the other German states. All restrictions on new enterprises (including those engaged in commerce) were lifted after the death of Francis I. The Austrians also built the second horse-drawn railway in the European continent (Linz-Budweis). Work on a steam railway heading north from Vienna started in 1836, when the revolutions broke out the monarchy contained more than 1,600 km of track. Steam navigation began on the Danube in 1830 and expanded quickly. Urban expansion of Vienna occurred and the population reached 400,000. Austria and Bohemia had a strong textile industry back then, there were steel and manufacturing settlements and factories for the production of glass and paper. The first attempts at mechanization, concentrated in the textile sector and the steel industry, date from between 1830 and 1847.

Within the next decade, a period of stagnation occurred, while other European countries began to experience a continued, steady growth. This slow down can be accredited, for the most part, to a period of ongoing war, beginning in 1848 and ending in 1866 with the Habsburgs' defeat by Prussia. This period of war, and a mounting budget deficit, took resources away from private industry, which discouraged industrial growth. This factor eventually brought the economy to a halt in the years after 1855 and Prussia also began to overtake Austria in industrial output rapidly, which eventually led to the Austrian defeat in 1866. Prussia produced five times more coal & iron and by 1870 its railway had twice the length of Austria's.

The Habsburgs' wars in the mid 19th century caused considerable economic backwardness through the rest of the 19th century. As other European economies had grown from the 1850s on, the Habsburgs' had shrunk, a consequence of the Habsburgs' continuing wars and Eastern Europe's continuing neutrality.

== See also ==
- Economy of Austria-Hungary
- Federal Ministry of Finance (Austria)

== Sources ==
- Adler, Simon (2020). Political Economy in the Habsburg Monarchy 1750–1774: The Contribution of Ludwig Zinzendorf. Cham: Springer Nature. ISBN 9783030310073.
- Fodor, Pál; Dávid, Géza, eds. (2000). Ottomans, Hungarians, and Habsburgs in Central Europe: The Military Confines in the Era of Ottoman Conquest. Leiden: Brill. ISBN 9004119078.
- Komlos, John. Nutrition and Economic Development in the Eighteenth-Century Habsburg Monarchy: An Anthropometric History (Princeton UP 2016)
- Roider, Karl (2021). "Austria". Encyclopædia Britannica. sec. "The Age of Metternich". (online)
