= Austrian Empire =

Empire in Europe from 1804 to 1867

Empire of Austria Kaisertum Österreich (German)
- 1804–1867
- Flag Imperial coat of arms
- Anthem: Gott erhalte Franz den Kaiser ("God Save Emperor Francis")
- The Austrian Empire in 1815, with the boundaries of the German Confederation in dotted lines

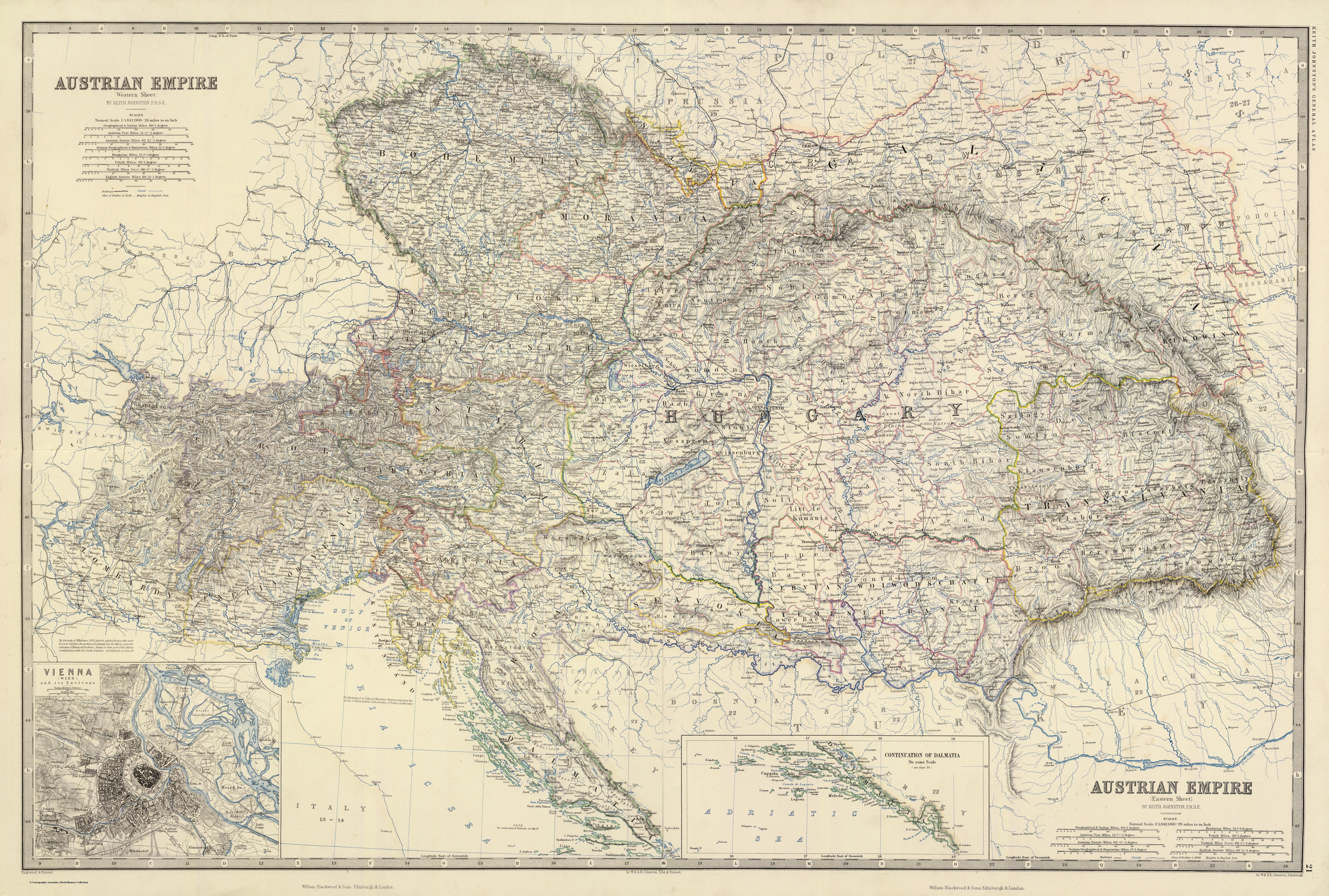
- Greatest extent of the Austrian Empire (1846–1859)
- Capital: Vienna
- Common languages: German, Hungarian, Czech, Slovak, Polish, Ruthenian, Slovene, Croatian, Serbian, Romanian, Istro-Romanian, Lombard, Venetian, Istriot, Friulian, Ladin, Italian, Ukrainian, Yiddish
- Religion: Majority: Roman Catholic (official); Minorities: Lutheranism, Calvinist, Eastern Orthodox, Eastern Catholic, Judaism
- Demonym: Austrian
- Government: Absolute monarchy (1804–1861); Constitutional monarchy (1861–1867)
- Emperor
  - 1804–1835: Francis I
  - 1835–1848: Ferdinand I
  - 1848–1867 (Note: Continued as emperor of Austria and king of Hungary until 1916): Franz Joseph I
- Minister-President
  - 1821–1848: Klemens von Metternich (first)
  - 1867: Friedrich Ferdinand von Beust (last)
- Legislature: Imperial Council
  - Upper house: House of Lords
  - Lower house: House of Deputies
- History
  - Proclamation: 11 August 1804
  - Dissolution of the Holy Roman Empire: 6 August 1806
  - Congress of Vienna: 8 June 1815
  - 1848 Revolution: 13 March 1848
  - Constitution adopted: 20 October 1860
  - Austro-Prussian War: 14 June 1866
  - Compromise of 1867: 30 March 1867

Area
  - Total: 698,700 km^{2} (269,800 sq mi)

Population
  - 1843 estimate: 37,500,000
- Currency: Gulden; Thaler (1804–1857); Vereinsthaler (1857–1867)
Preceded by
Holy Roman Empire
Archduchy of Austria
Electorate of Salzburg
Kingdom of Hungary
Bohemian Crown
Kingdom of Croatia
Kingdom of Slavonia
Kingdom of Galicia and Lodomeria
Principality of Transylvania
Free City of Cracow
Succeeded by
Austria-Hungary
Kingdom of Italy
Grand Duchy of Warsaw
- 1: Territories of Austria and Bohemia only.

The Austrian Empire, (Note: German: Kaiserthum Oesterreich, modern spelling Kaisertum Österreich, pronounced [ˌkaɪzɐtuːm ˈøːstɐraɪç].) officially known as the Empire of Austria, was a multinational European great power from 1804 to 1867, created by proclamation out of the realms of the Habsburgs. During its existence, it was the third most populous nation in Europe after the Russian Empire and the United Kingdom, while geographically, it was the third-largest empire in Europe after the Russian Empire and the First French Empire.

The empire was proclaimed by Francis II in 1804 in response to Napoleon's declaration of the First French Empire, unifying all Habsburg possessions under one central government. It remained part of the Holy Roman Empire until the latter's dissolution in 1806. It continued fighting against Napoleon throughout the Napoleonic Wars, except for a period between 1809 and 1813, when Austria was first allied with Napoleon during the invasion of Russia and later neutral during the first few weeks of the Sixth Coalition War. Austria and its allies emerged victorious in the war, leading to the Congress of Vienna, which reaffirmed the empire as one of the great powers of the 19th century.

The Kingdom of Hungary—as Regnum Independens—was administered by its own institutions separately from the rest of the empire. After Austria was defeated in the Austro-Prussian War of 1866, the Austro-Hungarian Compromise of 1867 was adopted, joining the Kingdom of Hungary and the Empire of Austria to form Austria-Hungary.

== Background ==
The background of the Austrian Empire is deeply rooted in the gradual rise and consolidation of the Habsburg monarchy, which developed over centuries as one of Europe's most powerful and enduring dynastic systems. The House of Habsburg began as relatively minor nobles in what is now Switzerland, but through a highly effective strategy of dynastic marriages, often summarized by the phrase "Bella gerunt alii, tu felix Austria nube" ("let others wage war; you, happy Austria, marry"), they expanded their influence across vast parts of Central Europe. By the 16th century, they controlled not only the Austrian hereditary lands but also territories such as Bohemia and Hungary, forming a loose but extensive composite monarchy.

Rather than being a unified state, the Habsburg monarchy functioned as a collection of distinct regions, each with its own laws, elites, and traditions, all held together by loyalty to the ruling Dynasty. This structure made governance complex, especially as the monarchy encompassed a wide range of ethnic groups, languages, and religions. The Habsburgs also became deeply tied to the Holy Roman Empire, with many of its rulers serving as emperors for centuries.

Religious conflict and external threats further shaped the monarchy's development. During the Reformation and Counter-Reformation, the Habsburgs positioned themselves as staunch defenders of Catholicism, which influenced both domestic policies and international alliances. At the same time, they faced persistent military pressure from the Ottoman Empire, particularly in Hungary and the Balkans. These conflicts pushed the monarchy toward greater centralization and military reform, especially from the 17th century onward.

By the 18th century, under rulers like Maria Theresa and Joseph II, the monarchy underwent significant administrative and institutional changes. These reforms aimed to strengthen central authority, modernize the state, and improve efficiency, though they often met resistance from local elites. Despite these efforts, the monarchy remained a patchwork of territories rather than a cohesive nation.

This long dynastic, multi-ethnic, and decentralized background is what ultimately gave shape to the Austrian Empire in 1804. The empire was less a new creation and more a formal rebranding of the Habsburg Monarchy under changing geopolitical pressures, especially in response to the transformations brought by Napoleon.

== History ==
=== Foundation ===
Changes shaping the nature of the Holy Roman Empire took place during conferences in Rastatt (1797–1799) and Regensburg (1801–1803). On 24 March 1803, the Imperial Recess (German: Reichsdeputationshauptschluss) was declared, which reduced the number of ecclesiastical states from 81 to only 3 and the free imperial cities from 51 to 6. This measure was aimed at replacing the old constitution of the Holy Roman Empire, but the actual consequence of the Imperial Recess, along with the French occupying the Electorate of Hanover in the same month and various Holy Roman states becoming allied with or against France, was the end of the empire. Taking this significant change into consideration, Holy Roman Emperor Francis II created the title Emperor of Austria for himself and his successors, thereby becoming Francis I of Austria. This new title and state were created to safeguard his dynasty's imperial status as he foresaw either the end of the Holy Roman Empire, or the eventual accession of Napoleon as Holy Roman Emperor, who had earlier that year adopted the title Emperor of the French and established the First French Empire. Initially Francis II/I continued to hold both titles but abdicated the throne of the Holy Roman Empire in 1806.

This new empire or "Kaiserthum" (lit. 'Kaiser-dom') comprised all the lands of the Habsburg monarchy, which had until then been legally separate realms in personal union (a composite monarchy) under Francis and his predecessors. By contrast, the Austrian Empire was legally a single state, although the overarching structure and the status of its component lands at first stayed much the same as they had been under the composite monarchy. This was especially demonstrated by the status of the Kingdom of Hungary, a country that had never been a part of the Holy Roman Empire and which had always been considered a separate realm – a status that was affirmed by Article X, which was added to Hungary's constitution in 1790 and described the state as a Regnum Independens. Hungary's affairs remained administered by its own institutions (King and Diet) as they had been beforehand; thus no Imperial institutions were involved in its government.

The fall and dissolution of the Holy Roman Empire was accelerated by French intervention in the Empire in 1805, with the French defeating Austrian armies at Ulm and Austerlitz, forcing an Austrian-French armistice on 6 December 1806. The Austrian losses encouraged rulers of imperial territories to ally with the French, receive higher titles and assert formal independence in the following days, such as Maximilian IV Joseph of Bavaria, Frederick III of Württemberg and Charles Frederick of Baden. Francis II agreed to the humiliating Treaty of Pressburg which recognised the rulers' new titles and ceded large territories to Napoleon's German allies and the French satellite Italy. In practice this meant the dissolution of the long-lived Holy Roman Empire and a reorganization under a Napoleonic model of the German states. Austrian claims on those German states were renounced without exception. On 12 July 1806, the Confederation of the Rhine was established, comprising 16 sovereigns and countries under French influence, de facto put an end to the Holy Roman Empire. On 6 August 1806, Francis proclaimed the dissolution of the Holy Roman Empire, as he did not want Napoleon to succeed him.

The dissolution of the Holy Roman Empire was not recognized by George III of the United Kingdom who was also the Elector of Hanover (formally Brunswick-Lüneburg) and Duke of Saxe-Lauenburg; Hanover and Lauenburg were incorporated into the French satellite Kingdom of Westphalia in 1807, having been occupied several times since 1801, but Britain remained at war with France and no treaty was signed recognising their annexation. His claims were later settled by the creation of the Kingdom of Hanover which was held by George IV and William IV as Kings of Hanover. Succession could only be in the male line, so on Queen Victoria's accession to the British throne, her uncle, Ernest Augustus, succeeded as King of Hanover, thus ending the personal union with Great Britain that dated to 1714.

=== Metternich era ===
Klemens von Metternich became Foreign Minister in 1809. He also held the post of Chancellor of State from 1821 until 1848, under both Francis I and his son Ferdinand I. The period of 1815–1848 is also referred to as the "Age of Metternich", with Metternich controlling the Habsburg monarchy's foreign policy and having a major influence in European politics. He was known for his strong conservative views and approach in politics, with policies strongly against revolution and liberalism. In his opinion, liberalism was a form of legalized revolution. Metternich believed that absolute monarchy was the only proper system of government. This notion influenced his anti-revolutionary policy to ensure the continuation of the Habsburg monarchy in Europe. Metternich was a practitioner of balance-of-power diplomacy. His foreign policy aimed to maintain international political equilibrium to preserve the Habsburgs' power and influence in international affairs. Following the Napoleonic Wars, Metternich was the chief architect of the Congress of Vienna in 1815. The Austrian Empire was the main beneficiary from the Congress of Vienna and it established an alliance with Britain, Prussia, and Russia forming the Quadruple Alliance. The Austrian Empire also gained new territories from the Congress of Vienna, and its influence expanded to the north through the German Confederation and also into Italy. Due to the Congress of Vienna in 1815, Austria was the leading member of the German Confederation. Following the Congress, the major European powers agreed to meet and discuss resolutions in the event of future disputes or revolutions. Because of Metternich's main role in the architecture of the Congress, these meetings are also referred to as the "Metternich congress" or "Metternich system". Under Metternich as the Austrian foreign minister, other congresses would meet to resolve European foreign affairs. These included the Congresses of Aix-la-Chapelle (1818), Carlsbad (1819), Troppau (1820), Laibach (1821), and Verona (1822). The Metternich congresses aimed to maintain the political equilibrium among the European powers and prevent revolutionary efforts. These meetings also aimed to resolve foreign issues and disputes without resorting to violence. By means of these meetings and by allying the Austrian Empire with other European powers whose monarchs had a similar interest in preserving conservative political direction, Metternich was able to establish the Austrian Empire's influence on European politics. Also, because Metternich used the fear of revolutions among European powers, which he also shared, he was able to establish security and predominance of the Habsburgs in Europe.

Under Metternich, nationalist revolts in Austrian north Italy and in the German states were forcibly crushed. At home, he pursued a similar policy to suppress revolutionary and liberal ideals. He employed the Carlsbad Decrees of 1819, which used strict censorship of education, press and speech to repress revolutionary and liberal concepts. Metternich also used a wide-ranging spy network to dampen down unrest.

Metternich operated very freely with regard to foreign policy under Emperor Francis I's reign. Francis died in 1835. This date marks the decline of Metternich's influence in the Austrian Empire. Francis' heir was his son Ferdinand I, but he suffered from health issues. Ferdinand's accession preserved the Habsburg dynastic succession, but he was not capable of ruling. The leadership of the Austrian Empire was transferred to a state council composed of Metternich, Francis I's brother Archduke Louis, and Count Franz Anton Kolowrat, who later became the first Minister-President of the Austrian Empire. The liberal Revolutions of 1848 in the Austrian Empire forced Metternich's resignation. Metternich is remembered for his success in maintaining the status quo and the Habsburg influence in international affairs. No Habsburg foreign minister following Metternich held a similar position within the empire for such a long time nor held such a vast influence on European foreign affairs.

Historians generally consider the Metternich era as a period of stability: the Austrian Empire fought no wars nor did it undergo any radical internal reforms. However, it was also thought of as a period of economic growth and prosperity in the Austrian Empire. The population of Austria rose to 37.5 million by 1843. Urban expansion also occurred and the population of Vienna reached 400,000. During the Metternich era, the Austrian Empire also maintained a stable economy and reached an almost balanced budget, despite having a major deficit following the Napoleonic Wars.

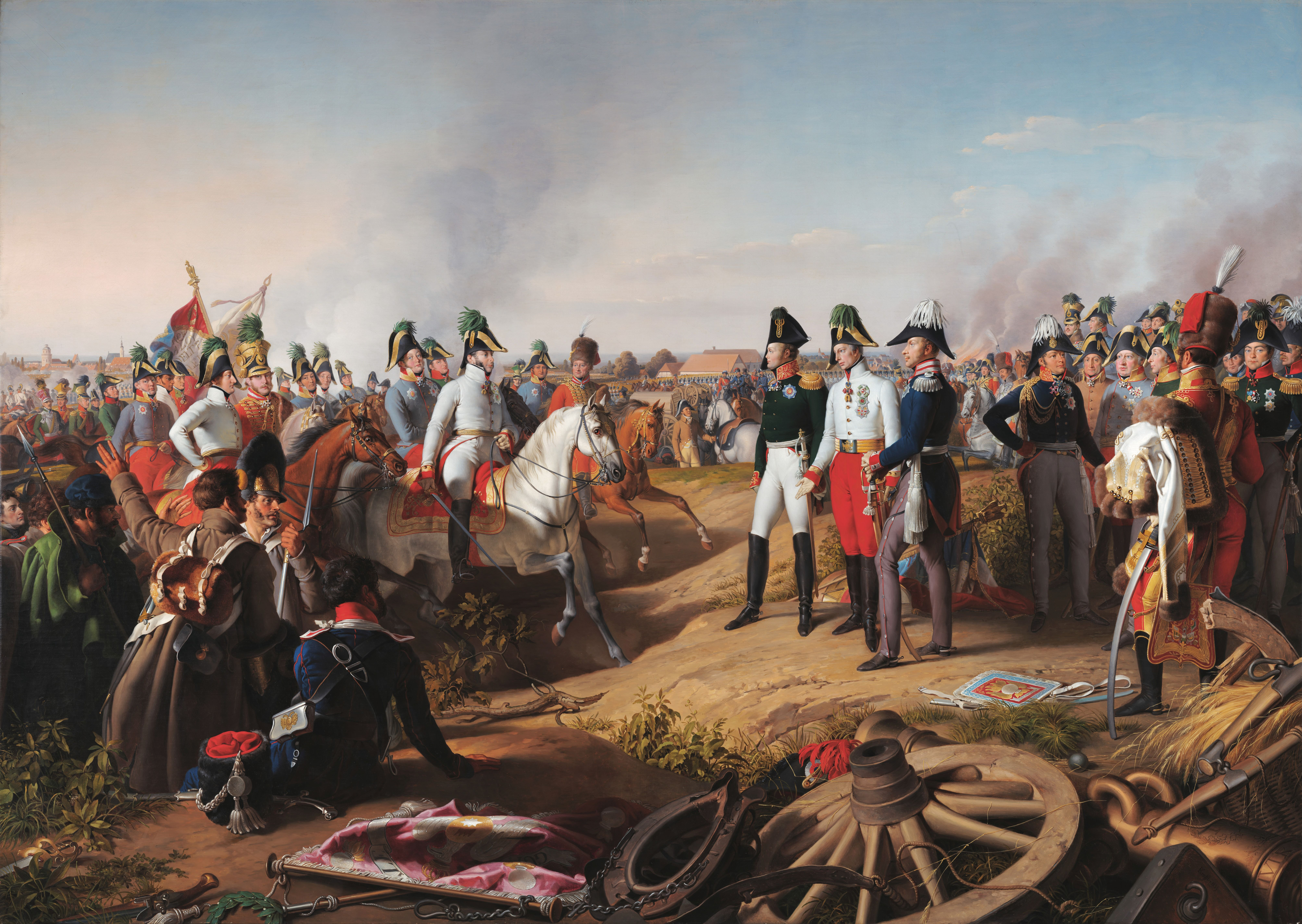
The Declaration of Victory After the Battle of Leipzig, by Johann Peter Krafft. Karl von Schwarzenberg and the monarchs of Austria, Prussia, and Russia after the Battle of Leipzig, 1813

=== Revolutions of 1848 ===
From March 1848 through November 1849, the Empire was threatened by revolutionary movements, most of which were of a nationalist character. Besides that, liberal and even socialist currents resisted the empire's longstanding conservatism. Although most of the revolution plans failed, some changes were made; significant lasting reforms included the abolition of serfdom, cancellation of censorship and a promise made by Ferdinand I of Austria said to implement a constitution throughout the whole Empire.

=== The Bach years ===
After the death of Prince Felix of Schwarzenberg in 1852, the Minister of the Interior Baron Alexander von Bach largely dictated policy in Austria and Hungary. Bach centralized administrative authority for the Austrian Empire, but he also endorsed reactionary policies that reduced freedom of the press and abandoned public trials. He later represented the Absolutist (or Klerikalabsolutist) party, which culminated in the concordat of August 1855 that gave the Roman Catholic Church control over education and family life. This period in the history of the Austrian Empire would become known as the era of neo-absolutism, or Bach's absolutism.

The pillars of the so-called Bach system (Bachsches System) were, in the words of Adolf Fischhof, four "armies": a standing army of soldiers, a sitting army of office holders, a kneeling army of priests and a fawning army of sneaks. Prisons were full of political prisoners, like Czech nationalist journalist and writer Karel Havlíček Borovský who was forcibly expatriated (1851–1855) to Brixen. This exile undermined Borovský's health and he died soon afterwards. This affair earned Bach a very bad reputation among Czechs and subsequently led to the strengthening of the Czech national movement.

However, Bach's relaxed ideological views (apart from the neo-absolutism) led to a great rise in the 1850s of economic freedom. Internal customs duties were abolished, and peasants were emancipated from their feudal obligations.

In its capacity as leader of the German Confederation, Austria participated with volunteers in the First War of Schleswig (1848–1850).

Sardinia allied itself with France for the conquest of Lombardy–Venetia. Austria was defeated in the 1859 armed conflict. The Treaties of Villafranca and Zürich removed Lombardy, except for the part east of the Mincio river, the so-called Mantovano.

=== After 1859 ===
The Constitution of 1861 (the "February Patent") created a House of Lords (Herrenhaus) and a House of Deputies (Abgeordnetenhaus). But most nationalities of the monarchy remained dissatisfied.

After the second war with Denmark in 1864, Holstein came under Austrian administration, and Schleswig and Lauenburg under Prussian administration. But the internal difficulties continued. Diets replaced the parliament in 17 provinces, the Hungarians pressed for autonomy, and Venetia was attracted by the now unified Italy.

After the Austrian army was defeated in the Austro-Prussian War of 1866 and the German Confederation was dissolved, the Austro-Hungarian Compromise of 1867 was adopted. By this act, the Kingdom of Hungary and the Empire of Austria as two separate entities joined on an equal basis to form the Dual Monarchy of Austria-Hungary.

Imperial standard of the Austrian Empire with the lesser coat of arms (used until 1915 for Austria-Hungary)

Imperial standard of the Austrian Empire with the medium coat of arms (used until 1915 for Austria-Hungary)

Merchant ensign from 1786 until 1869 and naval and war ensign from 1786 until 1915 (de jure, de facto until 1918)

== Foreign policy ==
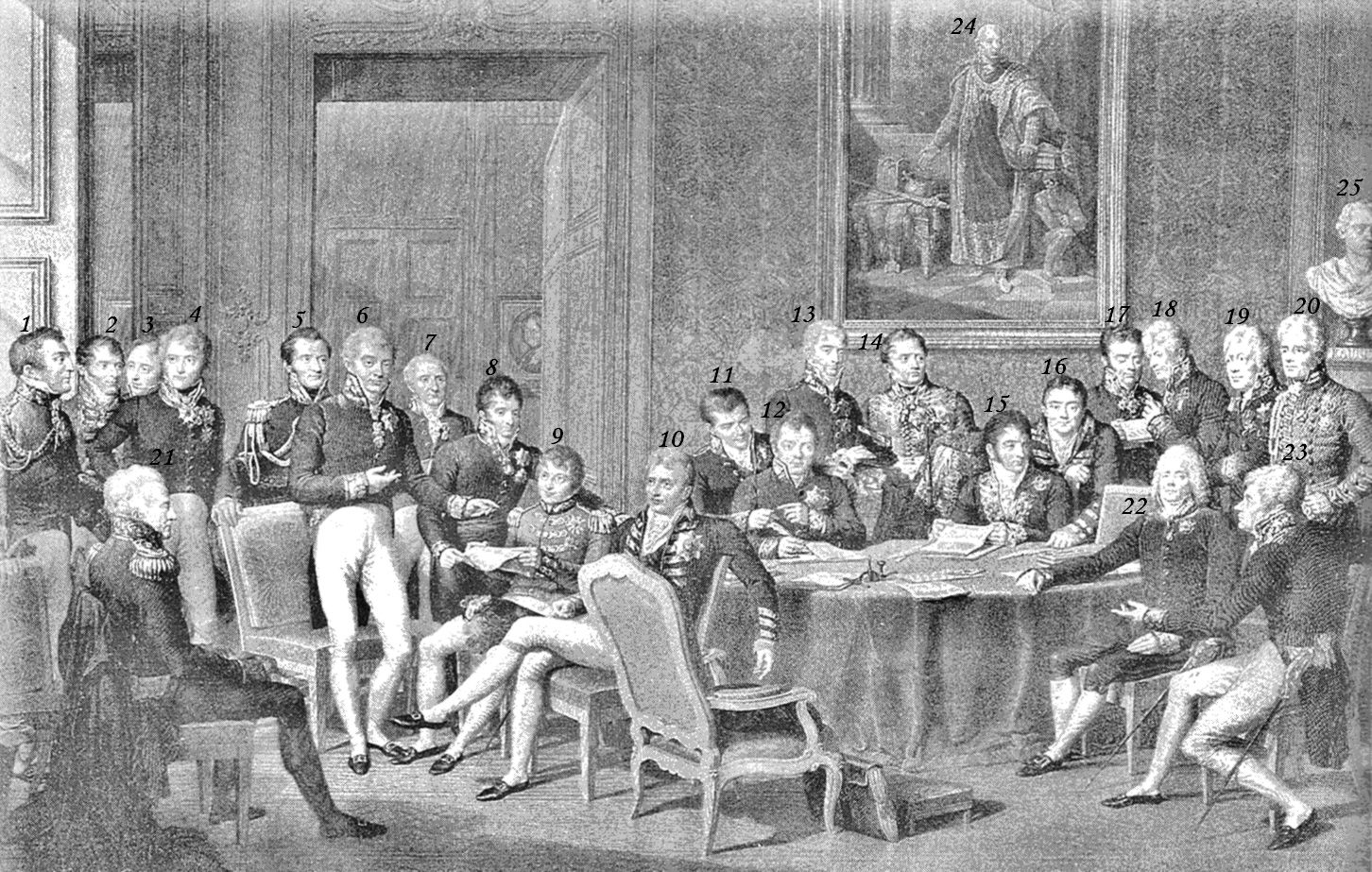
Metternich alongside Wellington, Talleyrand, an other European diplomats at the Congress of Vienna, 1815

The Napoleonic Wars dominated Austrian foreign policy from 1804 to 1815. The Austrian army was one of the most formidable forces the French had to face. After Prussia signed a peace treaty with France on 5 April 1795, Austria was forced to carry the main burden of war with Napoleonic France for almost ten years. This severely overburdened the Austrian economy, making the war greatly unpopular. Emperor Francis I therefore refused to join any further war against Napoleon for a long time. On the other hand, Francis I continued to intrigue for the possibility of revenge against France, entering into a secret military agreement with the Russian Empire in November 1804. This convention was to assure mutual cooperation in the case of a new war against France.

Austrian unwillingness to join the Third Coalition was overcome by British subsidies, but the Austrians withdrew from the war yet again after a decisive defeat at the Battle of Austerlitz. Although the Austrian budget suffered from wartime expenditures and its international position was significantly undermined, the humiliating Treaty of Pressburg provided plenty of time to strengthen the army and economy. Moreover, the ambitious Archduke Charles and Johann Philipp von Stadion never abandoned the goal of further war with France.

The Austrian Empire in 1812

Archduke Charles of Austria served as the Head of the Council of War and Commander in Chief of the Austrian army. Endowed with the enlarged powers, he reformed the Austrian Army to preparedness for another war. Johann Philipp von Stadion, the foreign minister, personally hated Napoleon due to an experience of confiscation of his possessions in France by Napoleon. In addition, the third wife of Francis I, Maria Ludovika of Austria-Este, agreed with Stadion's efforts to begin a new war. Klemens Wenzel von Metternich, located in Paris, called for careful advance in the case of the war against France. The defeat of French army at the Battle of Bailén in Spain on 27 July 1808 triggered the war. On 9 April 1809, an Austrian force of 170,000 men attacked Bavaria.

Despite military defeats of the Austrian army—especially the Battles of Marengo, Ulm, Austerlitz and Wagram—and consequently lost territory throughout the Revolutionary and Napoleonic Wars (the Treaties of Campo Formio in 1797, Luneville in 1801, Pressburg in 1806, and Schönbrunn in 1809), Austria played a decisive part in the overthrow of Napoleon in the campaigns of 1813–14. It participated in a second invasion of France in 1815, and put an end to Murat's regime in south Italy.

The latter period of Napoleonic Wars featured Metternich exerting a large degree of influence over foreign policy in the Austrian Empire, a matter nominally decided by the Emperor. Metternich initially supported an alliance with France, arranging the marriage between Napoleon and Francis I's daughter, Marie-Louise; however, by the 1812 campaign, he had realised the inevitability of Napoleon's downfall and took Austria to war against France. Metternich's influence at the Congress of Vienna was remarkable, and he became not only the premier statesman in Europe but the virtual ruler of the Empire until 1848—the Year of revolutions—and the rise of liberalism equated to his political downfall. The result was that the Austrian Empire was seen as one of the great powers after 1815, but also as a reactionary force and an obstacle to national aspirations in Italy and Germany.

During this time, Metternich was able to maintain an elaborate balance between Prussia, the lesser German states, and Austria in the German Confederation. Thanks to his efforts, Austria was seen as the senior partner with Prussia keeping watch over Germany as a whole. Further, Metternich opposed the weakening of France in the years after Napoleon, and viewed the new monarchy in Paris as an effective tool in keeping Russia at bay. From 1815 to 1848, Metternich steered Austria Imperial foreign policy, and indeed the mood of Europe, and managed to keep peace on the continent despite the growing liberal and radical movements inside most major powers. His resignation in 1848, forced by moderates in the court, and revolutionaries in the streets, may have caused the spread of the revolutions throughout the monarchy. It is stipulated that Metternich's departure emboldened liberal factions in Austria and Hungary, but this cannot be confirmed for certain.

During the Crimean War, Austria maintained a policy of hostile neutrality towards Russia, and, while not going to war, was supportive of the Anglo-French coalition. Having abandoned its alliance with Russia, Austria was diplomatically isolated following the war, which contributed to Russia's non-intervention in the 1859 Franco-Austrian War, which meant the end of Austrian influence in Italy; and in the 1866 Austro-Prussian War, with the loss of its influence in most German-speaking land.

== Constituent lands ==
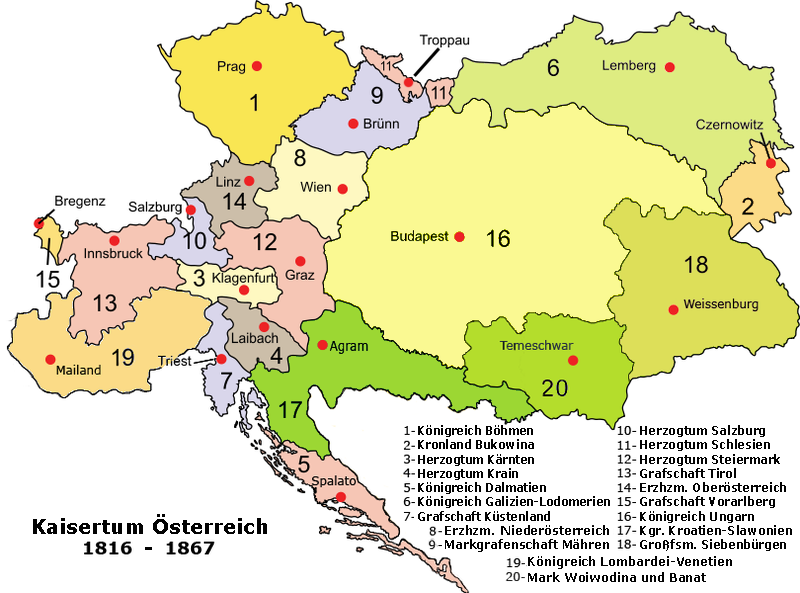
The Austrian Empire, between 1816 and 1859 (the Military Frontier is not shown)

The Austrian Empire, in 1866 and 1867

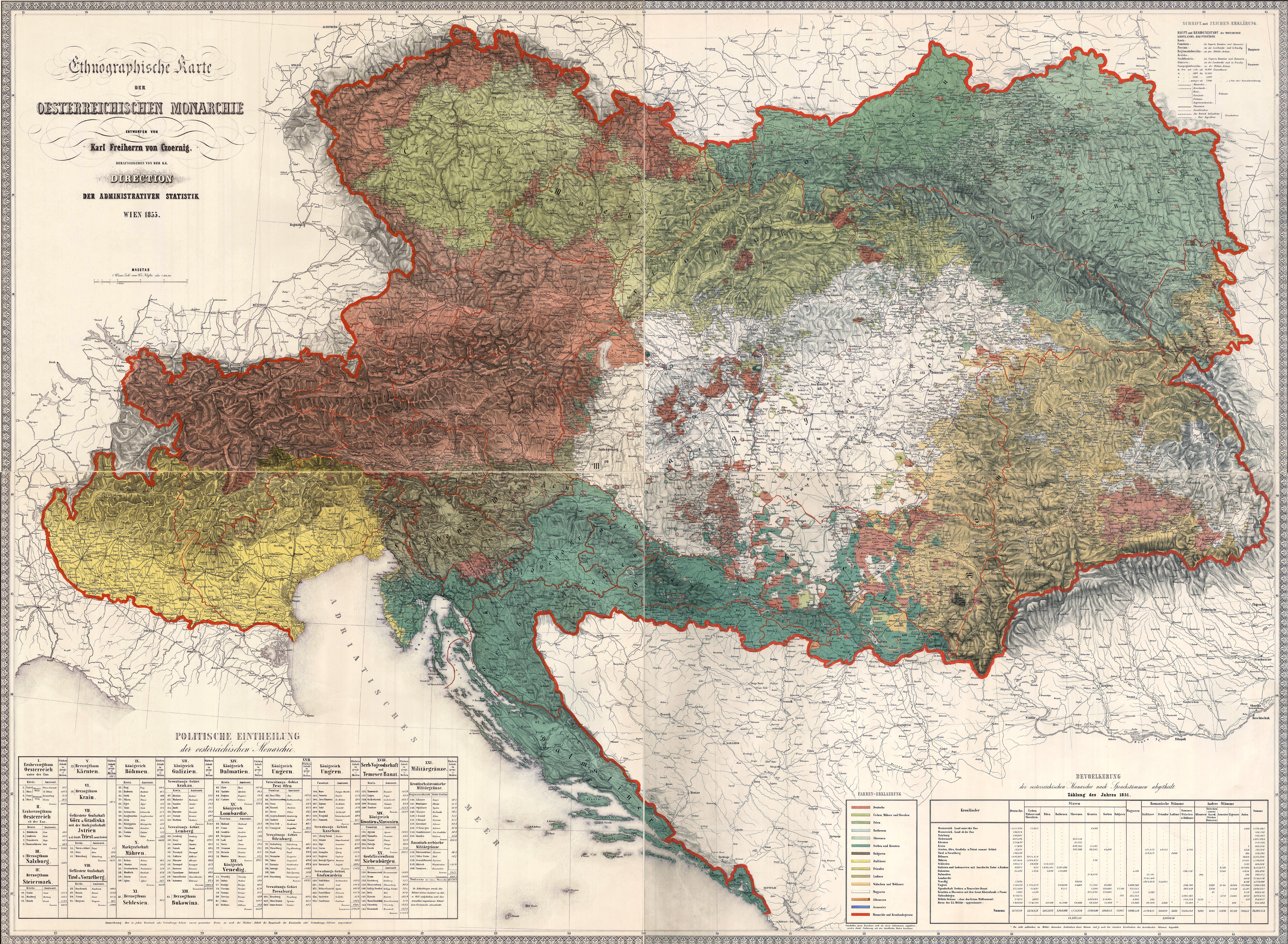
Ethnographic composition of the Austrian Empire in 1855

Crown lands of the Austrian Empire after the 1815 Congress of Vienna, including the local government reorganizations from the Revolutions of 1848 to the 1860 October Diploma:

- Archduchy of Austria (Erzherzogtum Österreich)
  - Lower Austria (Erzherzogtum Österreich unter der Enns)
  - Upper Austria (Erzherzogtum Österreich ob der Enns)
- Duchy of Salzburg (Herzogtum Salzburg), 1815–1850 Salzach District (Salzachkreis) of Upper Austria
- Duchy of Styria (Herzogtum Steiermark)
- Princely County of Tyrol with Vorarlberg (Gefürstete Grafschaft Tirol mit dem Lande Vorarlberg), subdivided in 1861
- Kingdom of Illyria (Königreich Illyrien), subdivided in 1849/1850:
  - Duchy of Carinthia (Herzogtum Kärnten)
  - Duchy of Carniola (Herzogtum Krain)
  - Littoral (Küstenland)
    - Princely County of Gorizia and Gradisca (Gefürstete Grafschaft Görz und Gradisca)
    - Imperial Free City of Trieste (Triest)
    - Margraviate of Istria (Markgrafschaft Istrien)
- Lands of the Bohemian Crown
  - Kingdom of Bohemia (Königreich Böhmen)
  - Margraviate of Moravia (Markgrafschaft Mähren)
  - Duchy of Silesia (Herzogtum Schlesien)
- Kingdom of Galicia and Lodomeria (Königreich Galizien und Lodomerien) with
  - Duchy of Bukovina (Herzogtum Bukowina), split off in 1850
- Kingdom of Dalmatia (Königreich Dalmatien)
- Kingdom of Hungary (Königreich Ungarn) with
  - Kingdom of Croatia (Königreich Kroatien)
  - Kingdom of Slavonia (Königreich Slawonien)
  - City of Fiume with its territory (Stadt Fiume mit Gebiet), Corpus separatum under Hungary from 1779; part of French Illyrian Provinces from 1809 then Kingdom of Illyria; restored to Hungary in 1822; to Croatia 1849
- Kingdom of Lombardy–Venetia (Lombardo-Venezianisches Königreich), lost in 1859/1866
- Grand Principality of Transylvania (Großfürstentum Siebenbürgen)
- Voivodeship of Serbia and Banat of Temeschwar (Woiwodschaft Serbien und Temescher Banat), from 1849, merged into Hungary and Slavonia in 1860
  - Serbian Vojvodina, de facto autonomous entity 1848/49, not officially recognized
  - Banat of Temeschwar (Banat)
- Military Frontier (Militärgrenze)
  - Croatian Military Frontier (Kroatische Militärgrenze)
  - Slavonian Military Frontier (Slawonische Militärgrenze)
  - Banat Military Frontier (Banater Militärgrenze)
  - Transylvanian Military Frontier (Siebenbürger Militärgrenze) merged into Transylvania in 1853

The old Habsburg possessions of Further Austria (in today's France, Germany and Switzerland) had already been lost in the 1805 Peace of Pressburg.

From 1850, Croatia, Slavonia, and the Military Frontier constituted a single land with disaggregated provincial and military administration, and representation.

Administratively, most of the crown lands excluding Hungary, Croatia, Slavonia, Transylvania, Lombardy–Venetia and the Military Frontier were divided into Kreise ('circles'), an administrative division introduced under Maria Theresa in the 18th century. Following the revolutions of 1848 a brief attempt was made to introduce modern-style political districts (in addition to the Kreise), but the reforms of Bach in 1853/54 instead instituted a system which delegated the responsibilities of the Kreise among subordinate Amtsbezirke ('office districts'), a system which persisted until 1867.

In the course of the post-1848 reforms Transylvania was also divided into Kreise in 1851 (re-divided in 1854); the Voivodeship of Serbia and Banat of Temeschwar was also divided into Kreise.

== Education ==
German was the primary language of higher education in the empire.

== Economy ==
Import and export (in florins)
Period	Import	Export
Yearly avg. (1823–1828)	88,650,219	95,905,780
Yearly avg. (1830–1835)	102,835,341	111,246,215
1837	120,897,761	119,621,758

The war drained the Austrian economy. The Austrian foreign trade was one-third of that of France and one-fifth of Great Britain based on 1823–37 numbers. Direct tax netto was 47,159,168 of which 37,599,496 were land-tax (1842).

== Demographics ==
The Austrian Empire was multi-national and multi-ethnic, with Germans, Hungarians (constituent in the Kingdom of Hungary), Slavs (Czechs, Poles, Ruthenians, Croats, Slovaks, Serbs, Slovenes) and Romanians, with smaller numbers of other ethnic groups. According to Dr. Becher's statistics, the population number was 36,950,401 in 1840. An estimation made in 1842 gives 35,500,000. Slavs made up an estimated 16 million, roughly 12 million north of the Danube and 4 million south of it. Germans made up an estimated 6,5 million, of which 3 million in Upper and Lower Austria, Tyrol and one-half of Styra, and the rest scattered in the other provinces. The Hungarians made up an estimated 5,5 million. Italians made up an estimated 4,6 million, in Lombardy, Venice, south Tyrol, and south Illyria. Wallachians made up an estimated 1,560,000 in Hungary and Transylvania.

In the mid-19th-century ethnographic works used the term nationalität (nationality) as a synonym for volk (ethnic group). The various terms used for the peoples of the monarchy were Nation, Volk, Völkerschaft and derivations Volkstamm, Volksgruppe.

The Revolutions of 1848 in the Austrian Empire included the minorities choosing sides between revolution against the monarchy or supporting the monarchy. When Hungary revolted, the kingdom's Croats, Serbs and Romanians supported the monarchy.

== Gallery ==
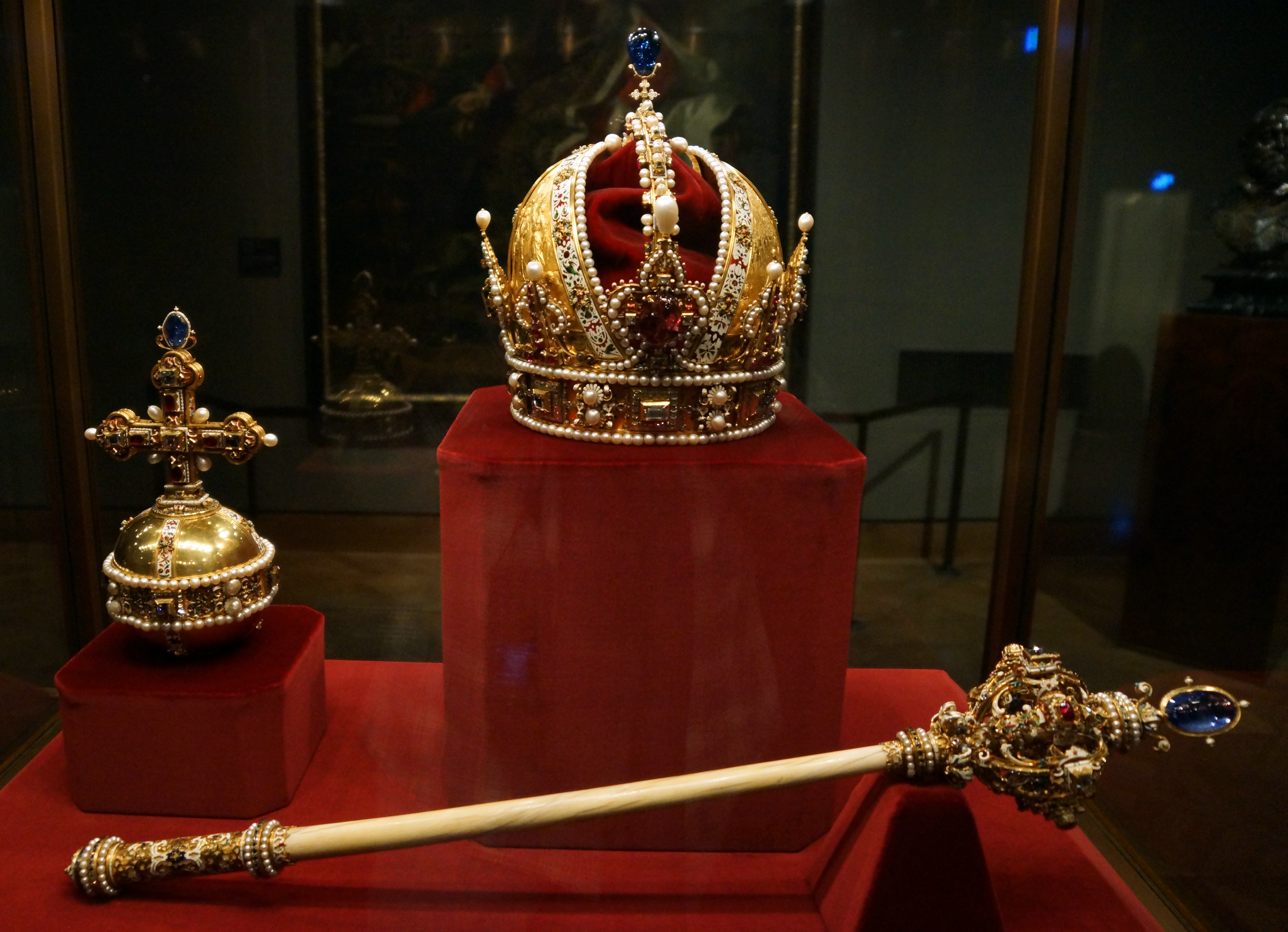
The crown jewels of Austria, with the 'hauskrone' of Rudolph II

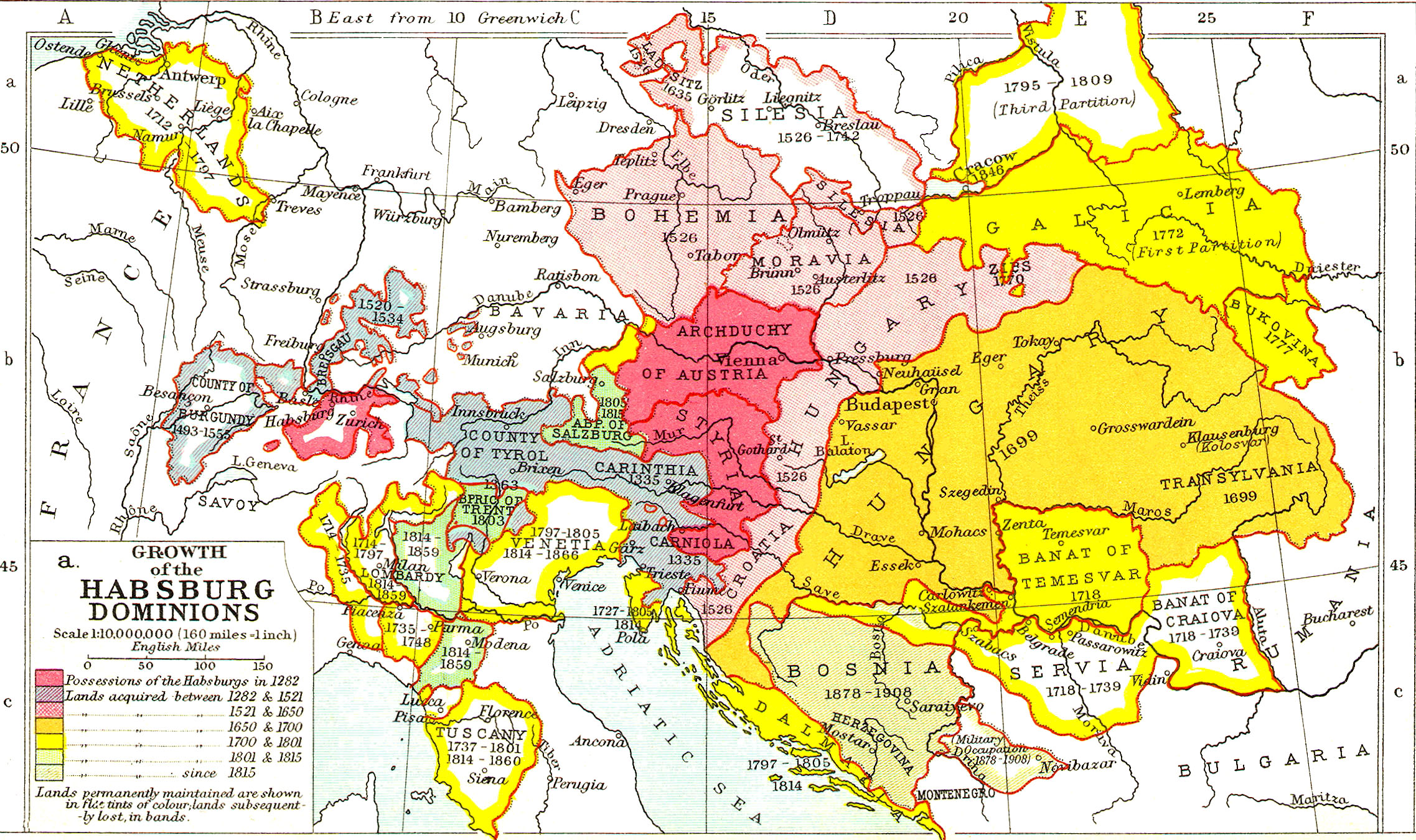
Growth of the Habsburg Monarchy

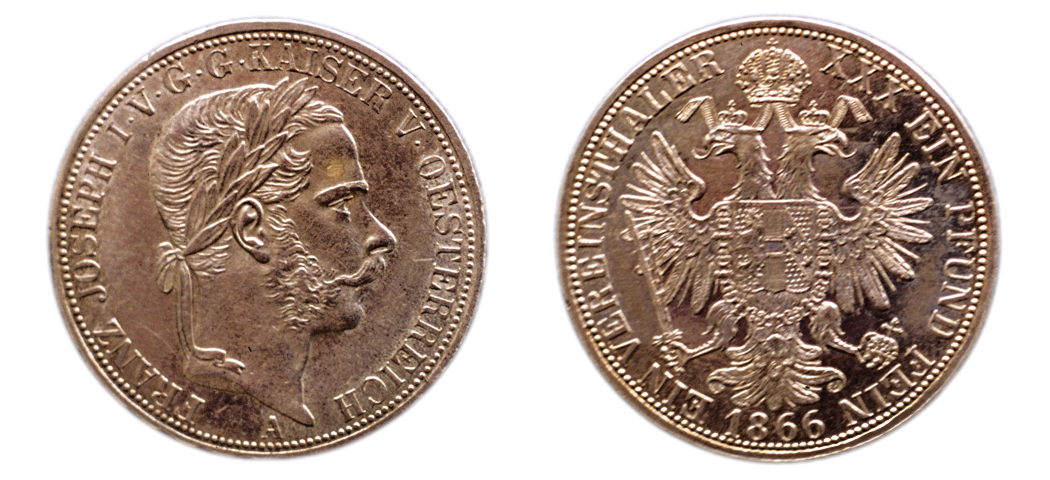
Vereinstaler of 1866

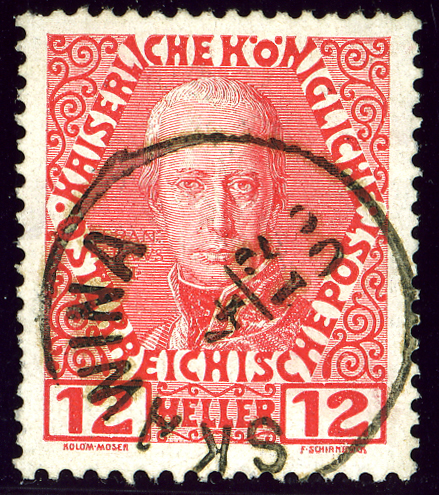
Postage stamp depicting Francis I

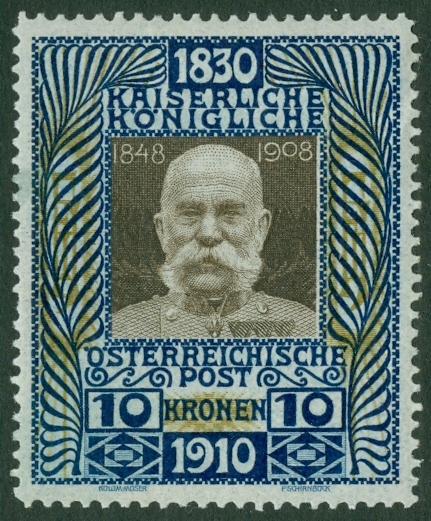
Postage stamp depicting Franz Joseph I

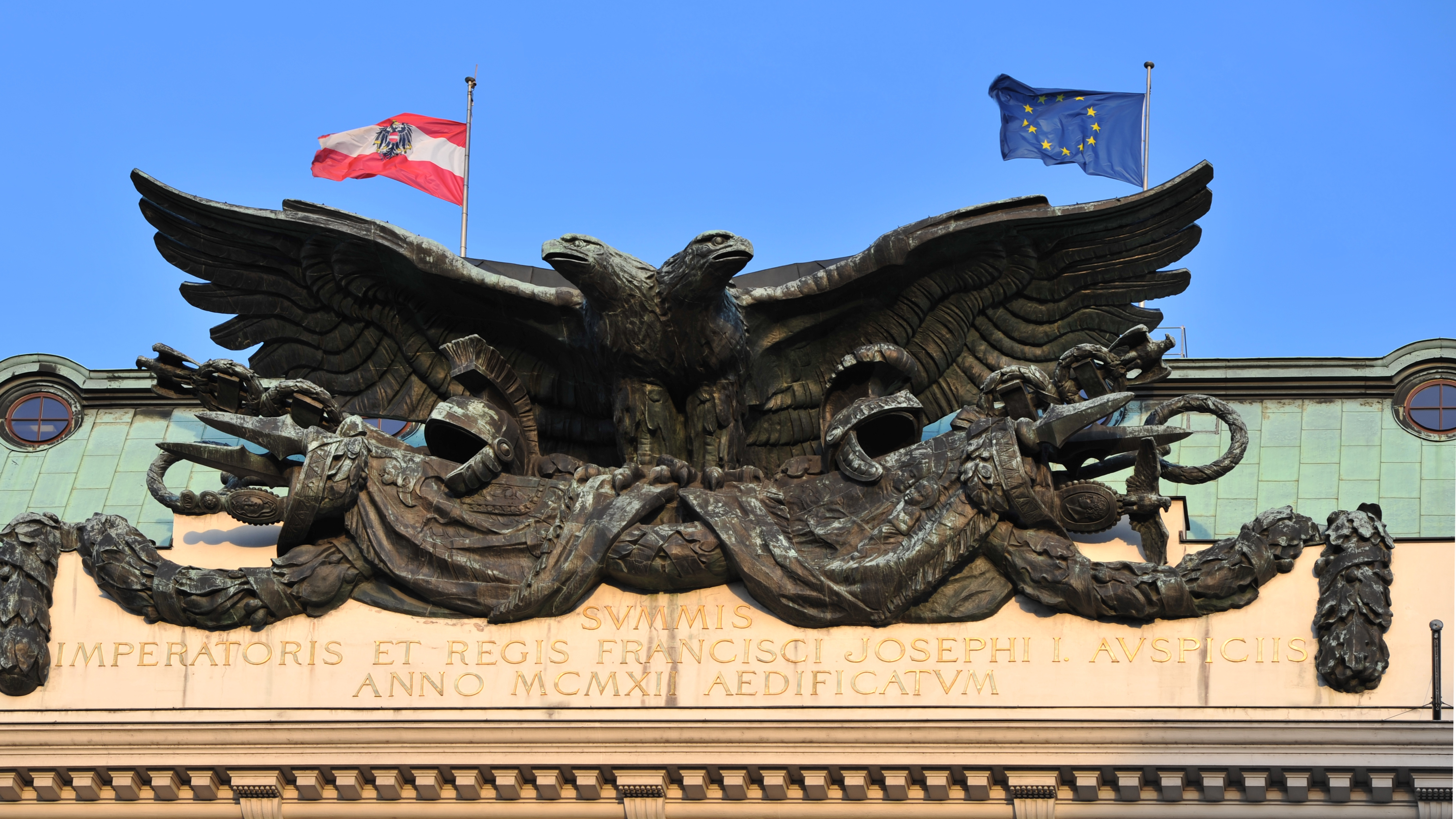
Double-headed eagle at the Ministry of War in Vienna

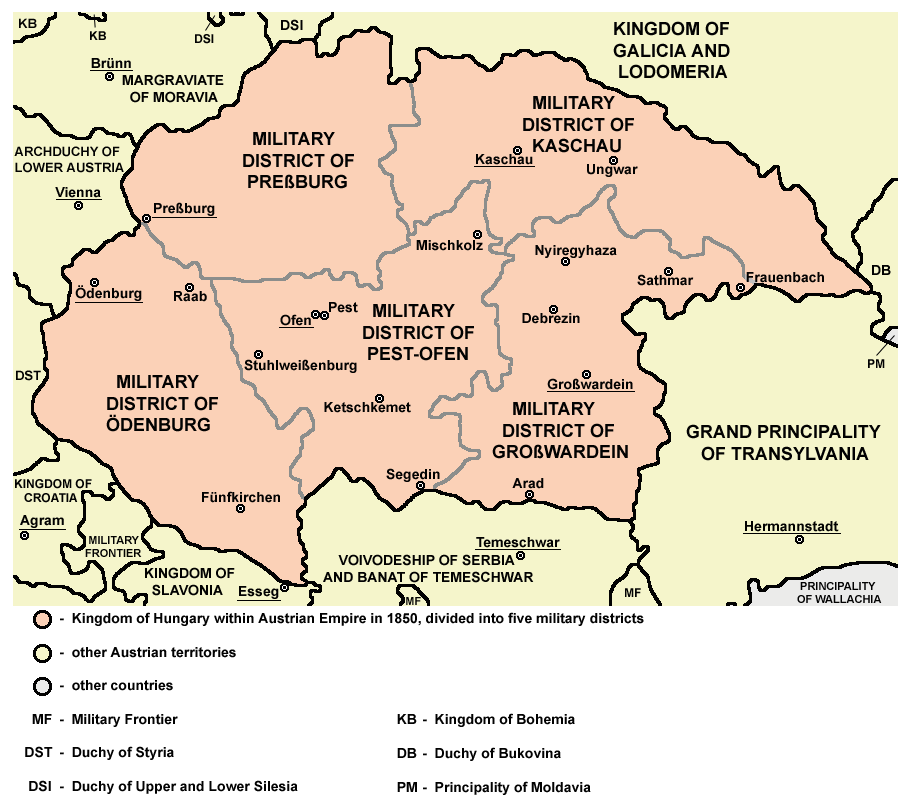
Military districts in Hungarian part of the Empire in 1850

== See also ==
- Former countries in Europe after 1815
- Austria-Hungary
- Cisleithania for the Austrian Empire after the Austro-Hungarian Compromise of 1867

== Sources ==
- Banfield, Thomas Charles (1842). The Austrian Empire: Her Population and Resources. Richard and John E. Taylor.
- Jelavich, Barbara (1975). The Habsburg Empire in European Affairs, 1814–1918. Archon Books. ISBN 978-0-208-01485-6.
