= Reich =

German word for "realm" or "empire"

Holy Roman Empire (800/962–1806) in 1714; the "First Reich"

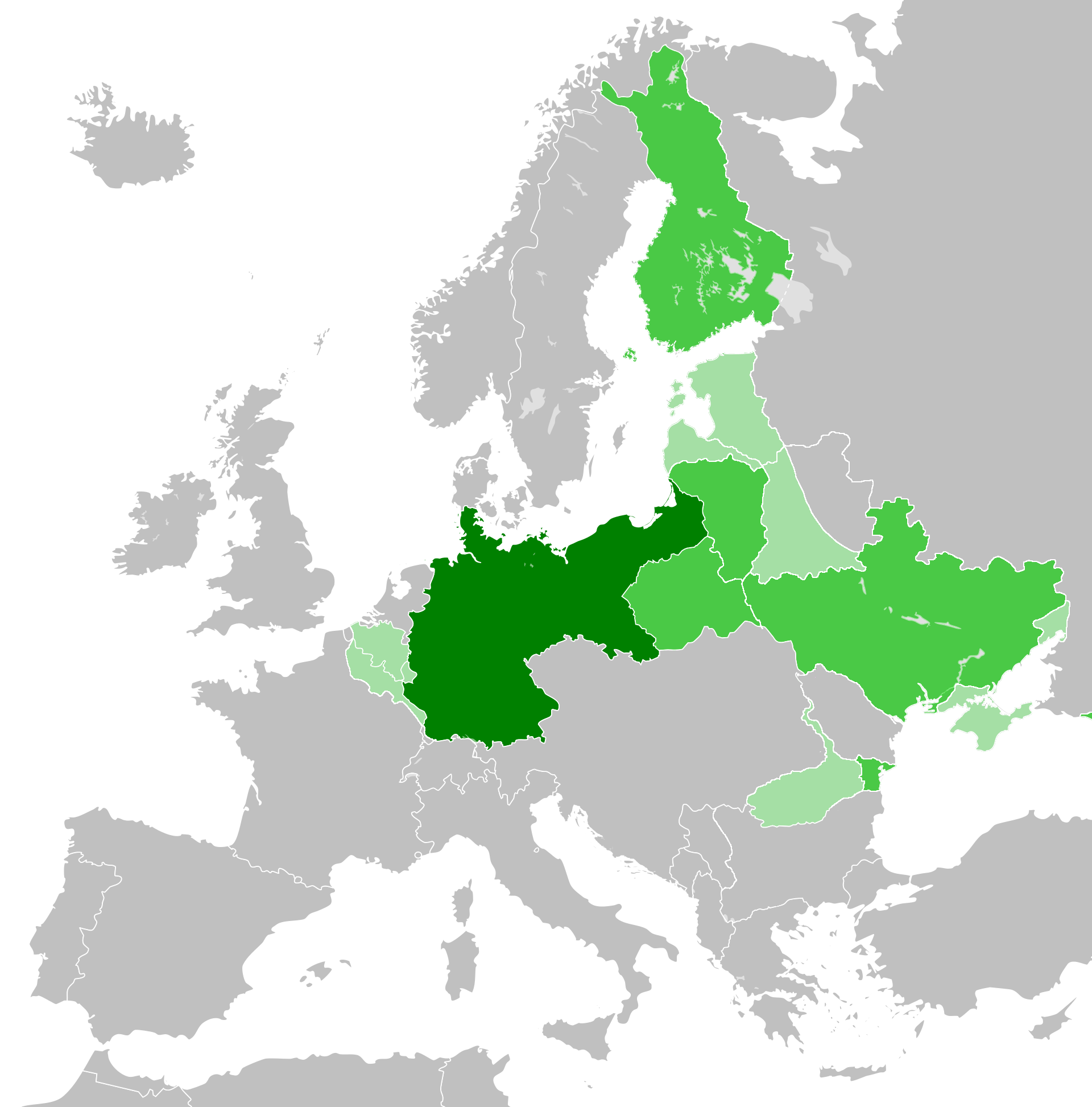
German Empire (1871–1918) in September 1918; the "Second Reich"

Nazi Germany (1933–1945) in 1942; the "Third Reich"

Reich (/raɪk, raɪx/ ryke, raikh; German: [ʁaɪç]) is a German word whose meaning is analogous to the English word "realm". (Note: Not to be confused with the German adjective reich, which means 'rich'.) The terms Kaiserreich (Note: German: [ˈkaɪzɐʁaɪç]; lit. 'realm of an emperor'.) and Königreich (Note: German: [ˈkøːnɪkʁaɪç]; lit. 'realm of a king') are respectively used in German in reference to empires and kingdoms. In English usage, the term "the Reich" often refers to Nazi Germany, also called "the Third Reich".

The term Deutsches Reich (sometimes translated to "German Empire") continued to be used even after the collapse of the German Empire and the abolition of the monarchy in 1918. There was no emperor, but many Germans, such as supporters of the DNVP, had imperialistic ambitions. According to historian Richard J. Evans:

The continued use of the term "German Empire", Deutsches Reich, by the Weimar Republic … conjured up an image among educated Germans that resonated far beyond the institutional structures Bismarck created: the successor to the Roman Empire; the vision of God's Empire here on earth; the universality of its claim to suzerainty; and in a more prosaic but no less powerful sense, the concept of a German state that would include all German speakers in central Europe—"one People, one Reich, one Leader", as the Nazi slogan was to put it.

The term is used for historical empires in general, such as the Roman Empire (Römisches Reich), Persian Empire (Perserreich), and both the Tsardom of Russia and the Russian Empire (Zarenreich, literally "Tsars' realm"). Österreich, the name used for Austria today, is composed of Öster- and Reich which, literally translated, means "Eastern Realm". The name once referred to the eastern parts of the Holy Roman Empire.

In the history of Germany specifically, it is used to refer to:

- the early medieval Frankish Realm (Francia) and Carolingian Empire (the Fränkisches Reich and Karolingerreich);
- the Holy Roman Empire (Heiliges Römisches Reich), which lasted from the coronation of Charlemagne as Holy Roman Emperor in 800, until 1806, when it was dissolved during the Napoleonic Wars;
- the German Empire (Deutsches Reich or Deutsches Kaiserreich), which lasted from the unification of Germany in 1871 until its collapse after World War I, during the German Revolution of 1918–1919;
- the Weimar Republic of 1919–1933 continued to use Deutsches Reich as its official name;
- Nazi Germany, the state often referred to as the Third Reich, which lasted from the Enabling Act in 1933 until the end of World War II in Europe in 1945. It continued to use the official name, Deutsches Reich (German Reich), until 1943, when it was renamed to the Großdeutsches Reich (Greater German Reich).

The Nazis adopted the term "Third Reich" to legitimize their government as the rightful successor to the retroactively renamed "First" and "Second" Reichs – the Holy Roman Empire and the German Empire, respectively; the Nazis discounted the legitimacy of the Weimar Republic entirely. The terms "First Reich" and "Second Reich" are not used by historians, and the term "Fourth Reich" is mainly used in fiction and political humor, although it is also used by those who subscribe to neo-Nazism.

== Etymology ==
The term is derived from the Germanic word which generally means "realm", but in German, it is typically used to designate a kingdom or an empire, especially the Roman Empire. The terms Kaisertum (German: [ˈkaɪzɐˌtuːm], 'Imperium') and Kaiserreich ('Imperial realm') are used in German to more specifically define an empire ruled by an emperor.

Reich is comparable in meaning and development (as well as descending from the same Proto-Indo-European root) to the English word "realm" (via French reaume 'kingdom' from Latin regalis 'royal').

The German noun Reich is derived from Old High German: rīhhi, which together with its cognates in Old English: rīce, Old Norse: ríki, and Gothic: reiki is derived from a Common Germanic *rīkijan. The English noun survives only in the compounds bishopric and archbishopric.

The German adjective reich, on the other hand, has an exact cognate in English rich. Both the noun (*rīkijan) and the adjective (*rīkijaz) are derivations based on the Common Germanic *rīks "ruler, king", reflected in Gothic as reiks, glossing ἄρχων "leader, ruler, chieftain".

It is probable that the Germanic word was not inherited from pre-Proto-Germanic, but rather loaned from Celtic (i.e. Gaulish rīx, Welsh rhi, both meaning 'king') at an early time.

The word has many cognates outside of Germanic and Celtic, notably Latin: rex and Sanskrit: राज, romanized: raj, lit. 'rule'. It is ultimately from Proto-Indo-European *reg-, lit. 'to straighten out or rule'.

== Usage throughout German history ==
=== Frankish Empire ===
Frankenreich or Fränkisches Reich is the German name given to the Frankish Kingdom of Charlemagne. Frankenreich came to be used of Western Francia and medieval France after the development of Eastern Francia into the Holy Roman Empire. The German name of France, Frankreich, is a contraction of Frankenreich used in reference to the kingdom of France from the late medieval period.

=== Holy Roman Empire ===
The term Reich was part of the German names for Germany for much of its history. Reich was used by itself in the common German variant of the Holy Roman Empire, (Heiliges Römisches Reich (HRR)). Der rîche was a title for the Emperor. However, Latin, not German, was the formal legal language of the medieval Empire (Imperium Romanum Sacrum), so English-speaking historians are more likely to use Latin imperium than German Reich as a term for this period of German history. The common contemporary Latin legal term used in documents of the Holy Roman Empire was for a long time regnum ("rule, domain, empire", such as in Regnum Francorum for the Frankish Kingdom) before imperium was in fact adopted, the latter first attested in 1157, whereas the parallel use of regnum never fell out of use during the Middle Ages.

==== Modern age ====
At the beginning of the modern age, some circles redubbed the HRE into the "Holy Roman Empire of the German Nation" (Heiliges Römisches Reich Deutscher Nation), a symptom of the formation of a German nation state as opposed to the multinational state the Empire was throughout its history.

Resistance against the French Revolution with its concept of the state brought a new movement to create a German "ethnical state", especially after the Napoleonic Wars. Ideal for this state was the Holy Roman Empire; the legend arose that Germany were "un-defeated when unified", especially after the Franco-Prussian War (Deutsch-Französischer Krieg, lit. "German-French war"). Before that, the German question ruptured this "German unity" after the 1848 Revolution before it was achieved, however; Austria-Hungary as a multinational state could not become part of the new "German empire", and nationality conflicts in Prussia with the Prussian Poles arose ("We can never be Germans – Prussians, every time!").

The advent of national feeling and the movement to create an ethnically German Empire did lead directly to nationalism in 1871. Ethnic minorities declined since the beginning of the modern age; the Polabs, Sorbs and even the once important Low Germans had to assimilate themselves. This marked the transition between Antijudaism, where converted Jews were accepted as full citizens (in theory), to Antisemitism, where Jews were thought to be from a different ethnicity that could never become German. Apart from all those ethnic minorities being de facto extinct, even today the era of national feeling is taught in history in German schools as an important stepping-stone on the road to a German nation.

=== German Reich ===
In the case of the Hohenzollern Empire (1871–1918), the official name of the country was Deutsches Reich ("German Realm"), because under the Constitution of the German Empire, it was legally a confederation of German states under the permanent presidency of the King of Prussia. The constitution granted the King of Prussia the title of "German Emperor" (Deutscher Kaiser), but this referred to the German nation rather than directly to the state of Germany.

The exact translation of the term "German Empire" would be Deutsches Kaiserreich. This name was sometimes used informally for Germany between 1871 and 1918, but it was disliked by the first German Emperor, Wilhelm I, and never became official.

The unified Germany which arose under Chancellor Otto von Bismarck in 1871 was the first entity that was officially called in German Deutsches Reich. Deutsches Reich remained the official name of Germany until 1945, although these years saw three very different political systems more commonly referred to in English as: "the German Empire" (1871–1918), the Weimar Republic (1919–1933; this term is a post-World War II coinage not used at the time), and Nazi Germany (1933–1945).

=== During the Weimar Republic ===
After 1918 "Reich" was usually not translated as "Empire" in English-speaking countries, and the title was instead simply used in its original German. During the Weimar Republic the term Reich and the prefix Reichs- referred not to the idea of empire but rather to the institutions, officials, affairs etc. of the whole country as opposed to those of one of its constituent federal states (Länder), in the same way that the terms Bund (federation) and Bundes- (federal) are used in Germany today, and comparable to The Crown in Commonwealth countries and The Union in the United States.

=== During the Nazi period ===
The Nazis sought to legitimize their power historiographically by portraying their ascendancy to rule as the direct continuation of an ancient German past. They adopted the term Drittes Reich ("Third Empire" – usually rendered in English in the partial translation "the Third Reich"), first used in a 1923 book entitled Das Dritte Reich by Arthur Moeller van den Bruck, that counted the medieval Holy Roman Empire (which nominally survived until the 19th century) as the first and the 1871–1918 monarchy as the second, which was then to be followed by a "reinvigorated" third one. The Nazis ignored the previous 1918–1933 Weimar period, which they denounced as a historical aberration, contemptuously referring to it as "the System". In the summer of 1939, the Nazis themselves actually banned the continued use of the term in the press, ordering it to use expressions such as Nationalsozialistisches Deutschland ("National Socialist Germany"), Großdeutsches Reich ("Greater German Reich"), or simply Deutsches Reich (German Reich) to refer to the German state instead. It was Adolf Hitler's personal desire that Großdeutsches Reich and nationalsozialistischer Staat ("[the] National Socialist State") would be used in place of Drittes Reich. Reichskanzlei Berchtesgaden ("Reich Chancellery Berchtesgaden"), another nickname of the regime (named after the eponymous town located in the vicinity of Hitler's mountain residence where he spent much of his time in office) was also banned at the same time, despite the fact that a sub-section of the Chancellery was in fact installed there to serve Hitler's needs.

Although the term "Third Reich" is still commonly used in reference to the Nazi dictatorship, historians avoid using the terms "First Reich" and "Second Reich", which are seldom found outside Nazi propaganda. During and following the Anschluss (annexation) of Austria in 1938, Nazi propaganda also used the political slogan Ein Volk, ein Reich, ein Führer ("One nation, one Reich, one leader"), in order to enforce pan-German sentiment. The term Altes Reich ("old Reich"; cf. French ancien regime for monarchical France) is sometimes used to refer to the Holy Roman Empire. The term Altreich was also used after the Anschluss to denote Germany with its pre-1938 post-World War I borders. Another name that was popular during this period was the term Tausendjähriges Reich ("Thousand-Year Reich"), the millennial connotations of which suggested that Nazi Germany would last a thousand years.

The Nazis also spoke of enlarging the then-established Greater German Reich into a "Greater Germanic Reich of the German Nation" (Großgermanisches Reich Deutscher Nation) by gradually and directly annexing all of the historically Germanic countries and regions of Europe into the Nazi state (Flanders, the Netherlands, Denmark, Norway, Sweden etc.).

=== Possible negative connotations in modern usage ===
A number of previously neutral words which were used by the Nazis later took on negative connotations in German (e.g. Führer or Heil); while in many contexts Reich is not one of them (Frankreich, France; Römisches Reich, Roman Empire; Österreich, Austria), it can imply German imperialism or strong nationalism if it is used to describe a political or governmental entity. Reich has thus not been used in official terminology since 1945, though it is still found in the name of the Reichstag building, which since 1999 has housed the German federal parliament, the Bundestag. The decision not to rename the Reichstag building was taken only after long debate in the Bundestag; even then, it is described officially as Reichstag – Sitz des Bundestages (Reichstag, seat of the Bundestag). As seen in this example, the term "Bund" (federation) has replaced "Reich" in the names of various state institutions such as the army ("Bundeswehr"). The term "Reichstag" also remains in use in the German language as the term for the parliaments of some foreign monarchies, such as Sweden's Riksdag and Japan's pre-war Imperial Diet.

=== Limited usage in the railway system of the German Democratic Republic ===
The exception is that during the Cold War, the East German railway incongruously continued to use the name Deutsche Reichsbahn (German Reich Railways), which had been the name of the national railway during the Weimar Republic and the Nazi era. Even after German reunification in October 1990, the Reichsbahn continued to exist for over three years as the operator of the railroad in eastern Germany, ending finally on 1 January 1994 when the Reichsbahn and the western Deutsche Bundesbahn were merged to form the unified state-owned enterprise Deutsche Bahn AG.

== Usage in related languages ==
=== In Scandinavian languages ===
The cognate of the word Reich is used in all Scandinavian languages with the identical meaning, i.e. "realm". It is spelled rige in Danish and older Norwegian (before the 1907 spelling reform) and rike in Swedish and modern Norwegian. The word is traditionally used for sovereign entities, generally simply means "country" or "nation" (in the sense of a sovereign state) and does not have any special or political connotations. It does not imply any particular form of government, but it implies that the entity is both of a certain size and of a certain standing, like the Scandinavian kingdoms themselves; hence the word might be considered exaggerated for very small states like a city-state. Its use as a stand-alone word is more widespread than in contemporary German, but most often, it refers to the three Scandinavian states themselves and certain historical empires, like the Roman Empire. The standard word for a "country" is usually land, and there are many other words used to refer to countries.

The word is part of the official names of Denmark, Norway and Sweden in the form of kongerige (Danish), kongerike (Norwegian), and konungarike (Swedish), all meaning kingdom, or literally the "realm of a king" (a kingdom can also be called kongedømme in Danish and Norwegian and kungadöme or konungadöme in Swedish, direct cognates of the English word). Two regions in Norway that were petty kingdoms before the unification of Norway around 900 AD have retained the word in the names (see Ringerike and Romerike). The word is also used in "Svea rike", with the current spelling Sverige, the name of Sweden in Swedish. Thus in the official name of Sweden, Konungariket Sverige, the word rike appears twice.

The derived prefix rigs- (Danish and pre-1907 Norwegian) and riks- (Swedish and Norwegian) and implies nationwide or under central jurisdiction. Examples include riksväg and riksvei, names for a national road in Swedish and Norwegian. It is also present in the names of numerous institutions in all the Scandinavian countries, such as Rigsrevisionen (the agency responsible for oversight of the state finances in Denmark) and Sveriges Riksbank (commonly known as just Riksbanken), the central bank of Sweden. It is also used in words such as udenrigs (Danish), utrikes (Swedish) and utenriks (Norwegian), relating to foreign countries and other things from abroad. The opposite word is indenrigs/inrikes/innenriks, meaning domestic.

The adjective form of the word, rig in Danish and rik in Swedish/Norwegian, means "rich" like in other Germanic languages.

=== Rijk/ryk ===
Rijk is the Dutch and ryk the Afrikaans and Frisian equivalent of the German word Reich.

In a political sense in the Netherlands and Belgium, the word rijk often connotes a connection with the Kingdom of the Netherlands and the Kingdom of Belgium as opposed to the European part of the Netherlands or the provincial or municipal governments. The ministerraad is the executive body of the Netherlands' government and the rijksministerraad that of the Kingdom of the Netherlands, a similar distinction is found in wetten (laws) versus rijkswetten (kingdom laws) or the now-abolished rijkswacht (lit. 'guard of the realm') for the Belgian Gendarmerie. The word rijk can also be found in institutions like the Rijkswaterstaat, Rijksinstituut voor Volksgezondheid en Milieu and Rijksuniversiteit Groningen. The German way of applying rijk is largely followed in Dutch, resulting in Frankrijk (France), Oostenrijk (Austria) and the historical Persische Rijk and Romeinse Rijk for the Persian and Roman Empires respectively.

In colloquial speech, rijk usually means working for the central government rather than the provincial or municipal government, much as Americans refer to the "federal" government.

In Afrikaans, ryk refers to rulership and area of governance (mostly a kingdom), but in a modern sense, the term is used in a much more figurative sense (e.g. Die Hemelse Ryk 'the Heavenly Kingdom', China), as the sphere under one's control or influence:

- die drie ryke van die natuur: die plante-, diere- en delfstowweryk 'the three kingdoms of nature: the plant, animal and mineral kingdom'
- die duisendjarige ryk 'the thousand-year realm', the Biblical millennium
- die ryk van die verbeelding, van drome 'the realm of the imagination, of dreams'
- 'n bestuurder wat sy ryk goed beheer 'a manager who controls his domain well'

As in German, the adjective rijk/ryk also means "rich".

== See also ==
- Germany
- German Reich
- Imperium
- Reich (disambiguation)
