= Kaiserthum =

Kaiserthum (Modern German spelling Kaisertum, pronounced [ˈkaɪzɐˌtuːm]; lit. 'Kaiser-dom'; pl. Kaisertümer [ˈkaɪzɐˌtyːmɐ] ) is a German word for Empire in its meaning as a state ruled over by an Emperor, used in the 18th and 19th centuries. It is most known as a description of the Empire of Austria after its creation in 1804. A later used German term for it is Kaiserreich.

== See also ==
- Kingdom of Hungary (1526–1867)
