= Antonov An-2 =

Soviet single-engine civilian aircraft

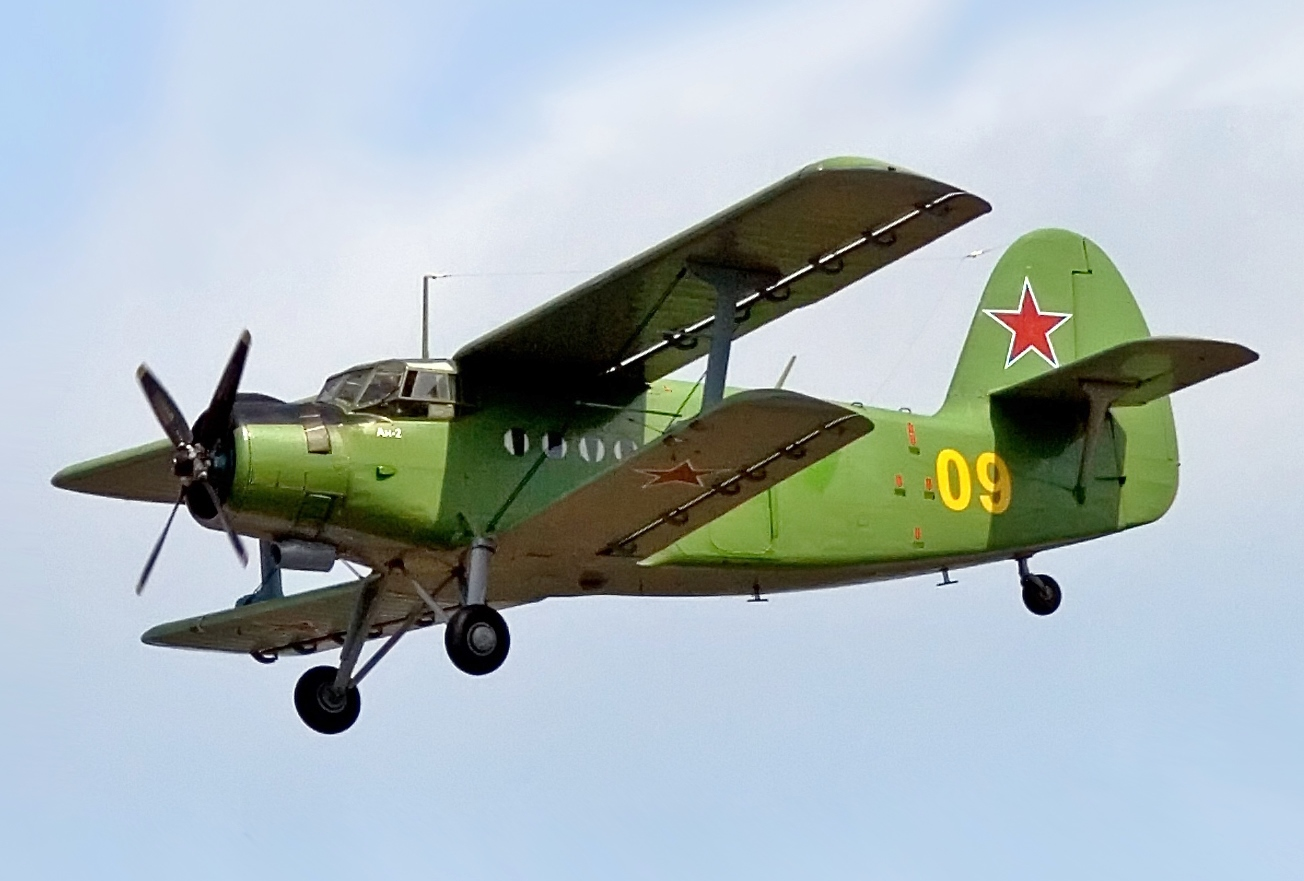
- An-2 in Soviet Air Forces markings

General information
- Type: Agricultural, utility aircraft and military transport aircraft
- Manufacturer: Antonov
- Designer: Oleg Antonov
- Status: In service
- Primary users: Soviet Air Forces (historical): Russian Aerospace Forces; Korean People's Army Air Force; Ukrainian Air Force
- Number built: 18,000+

History
- Manufactured: 1947–2001
- First flight: 31 August 1947
- Developed into: Antonov An-3; SibNIA TVS-2DTS

The Antonov An-2 (USAF/DoD reporting name Type 22, NATO reporting name Colt) is a Soviet mass-produced single-engine biplane utility/agricultural aircraft designed and manufactured by the Antonov Design Bureau beginning in 1947. Its durability, lifting power, and ability to take off and land from poor runways have given it a long service life. The An-2 was produced up to 2001 and remains in service with military and civilian operators around the world.

The An-2 was designed as a utility aircraft for forestry and agriculture, but the basic airframe is adaptable and numerous variants have been developed. These include hopper-equipped crop-dusters, scientific versions for atmospheric sampling, water-bombers for fighting forest fires, air ambulances, seaplanes, and versions for dropping paratroopers.

The most common version is the An-2T 12-seater passenger aircraft. All versions (other than the An-3 and the An-2-100) are powered by a 750 kW (1,010 hp) nine-cylinder Shvetsov ASh-62 radial engine.

== Design and development ==
=== Origins ===
The Antonov An-2 was designed to meet a 1940s Soviet Ministry of Forestry requirement to replace the smaller Polikarpov Po-2, which was used in large numbers in both agricultural and utility roles. Antonov designed a large single bay biplane of all-metal construction, with an enclosed cockpit and a cabin with seats for twelve passengers. The first prototype, designated SKh-1, powered by a Shvetsov ASh-21 radial engine, flew on 31 August 1947 from Yeltsovka Airport in Novosibirsk Oblast, Russia. The second prototype was fitted with a more powerful Shvetsov ASh-62 engine, which allowed the aircraft's payload to be increased from 1,300 to 2,140 kg (2,870 to 4,720 lb), and in this form saw production.

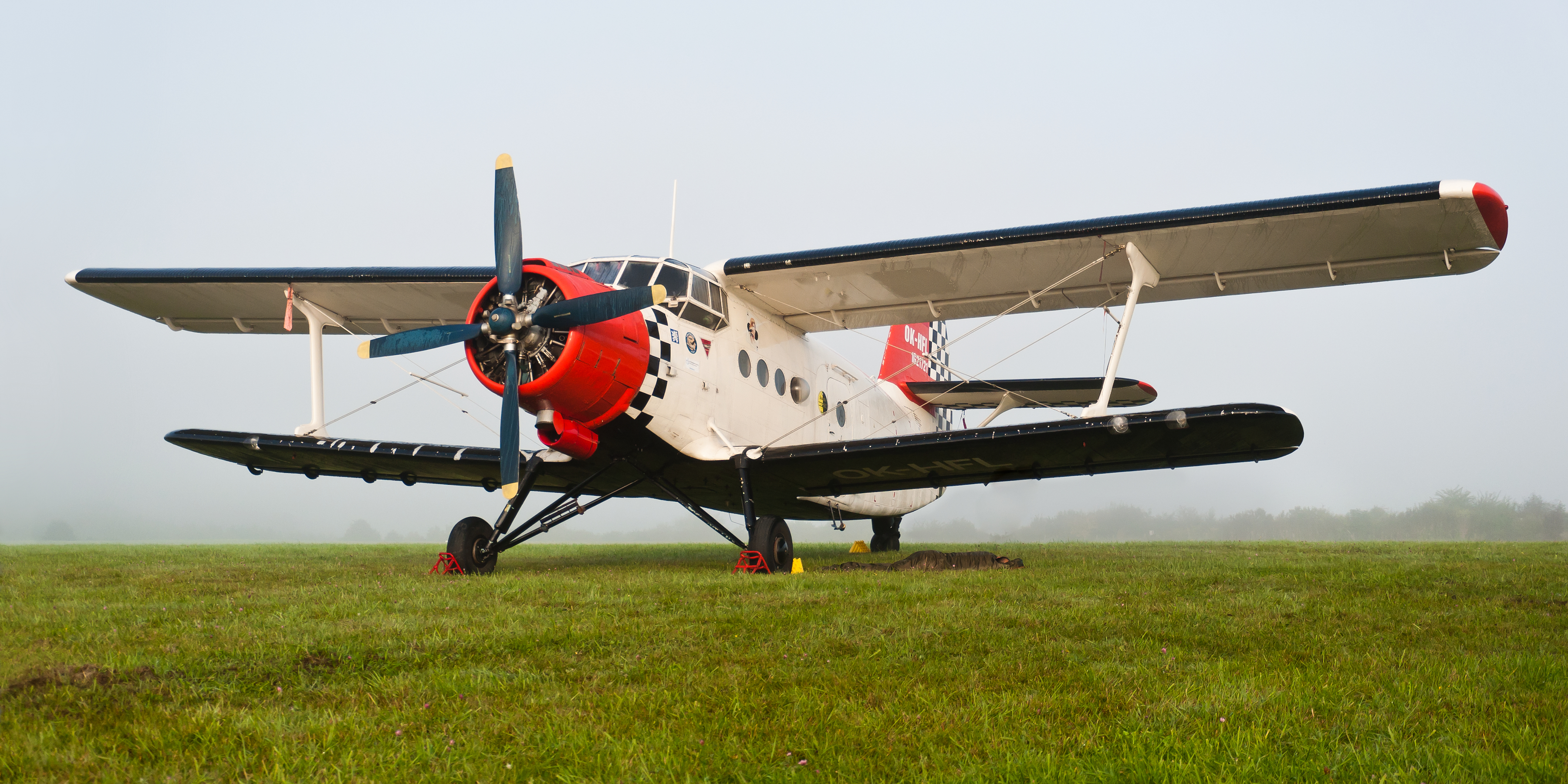
On the static display of "Oldtimer Fliegertreffen" Hahnweide 2011

Initial production was at State Factory 473 in Kyiv, Ukrainian SSR, where the majority of up to 5,000 units had been produced by 1960. Later Soviet production (after 1965, of model An-2M especially) was at State Factory 464 at Dolgoprudniy, Russian SFSR. After 1960, most An-2s were constructed at Poland's WSK factory in Mielec. It is believed that over 13,000 were built in Poland before manufacturing ended in 1991.

Until 2001, limited production was undertaken using remaining stocks of spares, including a small batch of four aircraft that were produced for Vietnam. China also builds the An-2 under licence as the Shijiazhuang Y-5. The An-2 is commonly used as a light utility transport, parachute drop aircraft, agricultural work and other tasks suited to a large slow biplane. Its slow flight and good short field performance make it suited for short, unimproved fields, and some specialized variants have also been built for cold weather and other extreme environments. The Guinness Book of World Records states that the 45-year production run for the An-2 was for a time the longest for any aircraft and challenged the over two decade-long run of the 1920s Polikarpov Po-2 it replaced. The An-2's record has since been exceeded.

=== Further development ===
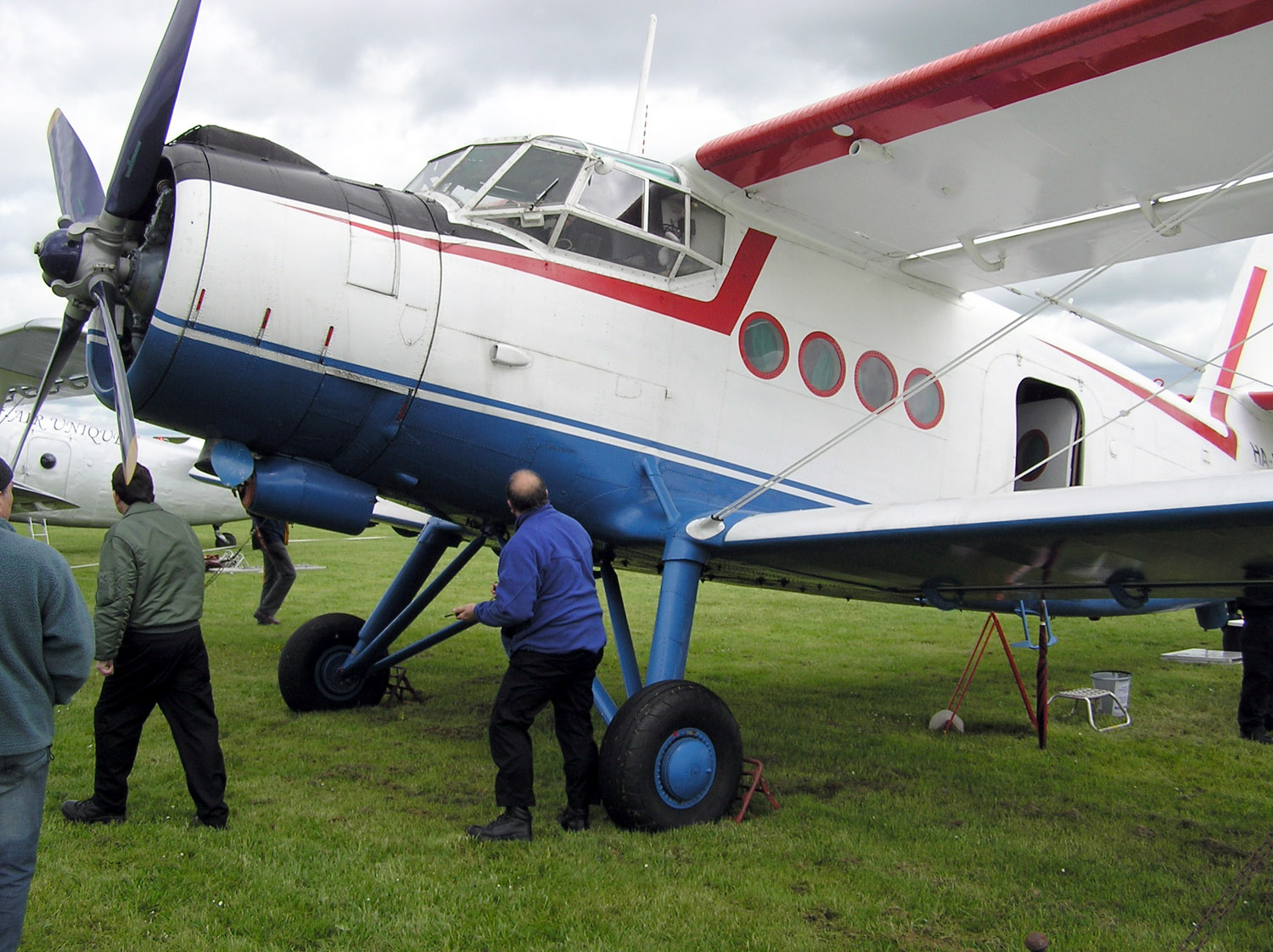
Closeup of a private An-2TP

During the early 1980s, Antonov experimented with an An-2 powered by a 1,080 kW (1,450 hp) Glushenkov turboprop engine. Aircraft with this engine had a longer, streamlined nose. It received the designation An-3.

During 2013, Antonov announced that it had flown a new An-2 version, the An-2-100, with a three-blade reversible propeller and a 1,100 kW (1,500 shp) Motor Sich MS-14 turboprop running on kerosene rather than Avgas, which is no longer produced in CIS countries. That same year, the company stated that it had received orders for upgrading hundreds in Azerbaijan, Cuba and Russia to the An-2-100 version.

The Siberian Research Institute of Aviation (SIBNIA) test flew a modified An-2 with winglets and a carbon fibre wing structure. It was equipped with a turboprop engine with a five bladed propeller. According to Russian aviation company Sukhoi, this aircraft was a demonstrator for an An-2 replacement announced on 10 June 2015. The carbonfibre composite materials, including wing panels, spars and ribs were produced by the Novosibirsk Aviation Plant. Sukhoi says the design change increased its speed by 50%.

== Design ==
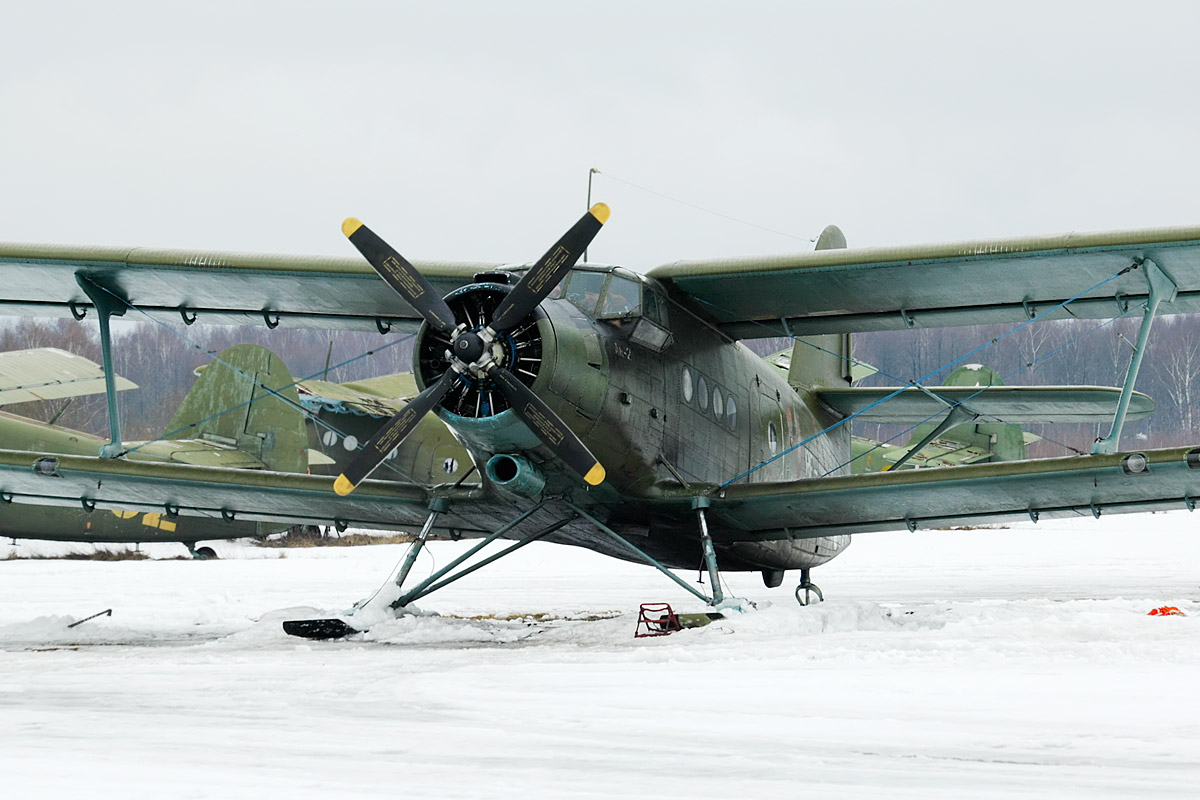
An-2 on skis at Volosovo air field, Chekhovsky District, Moscow region

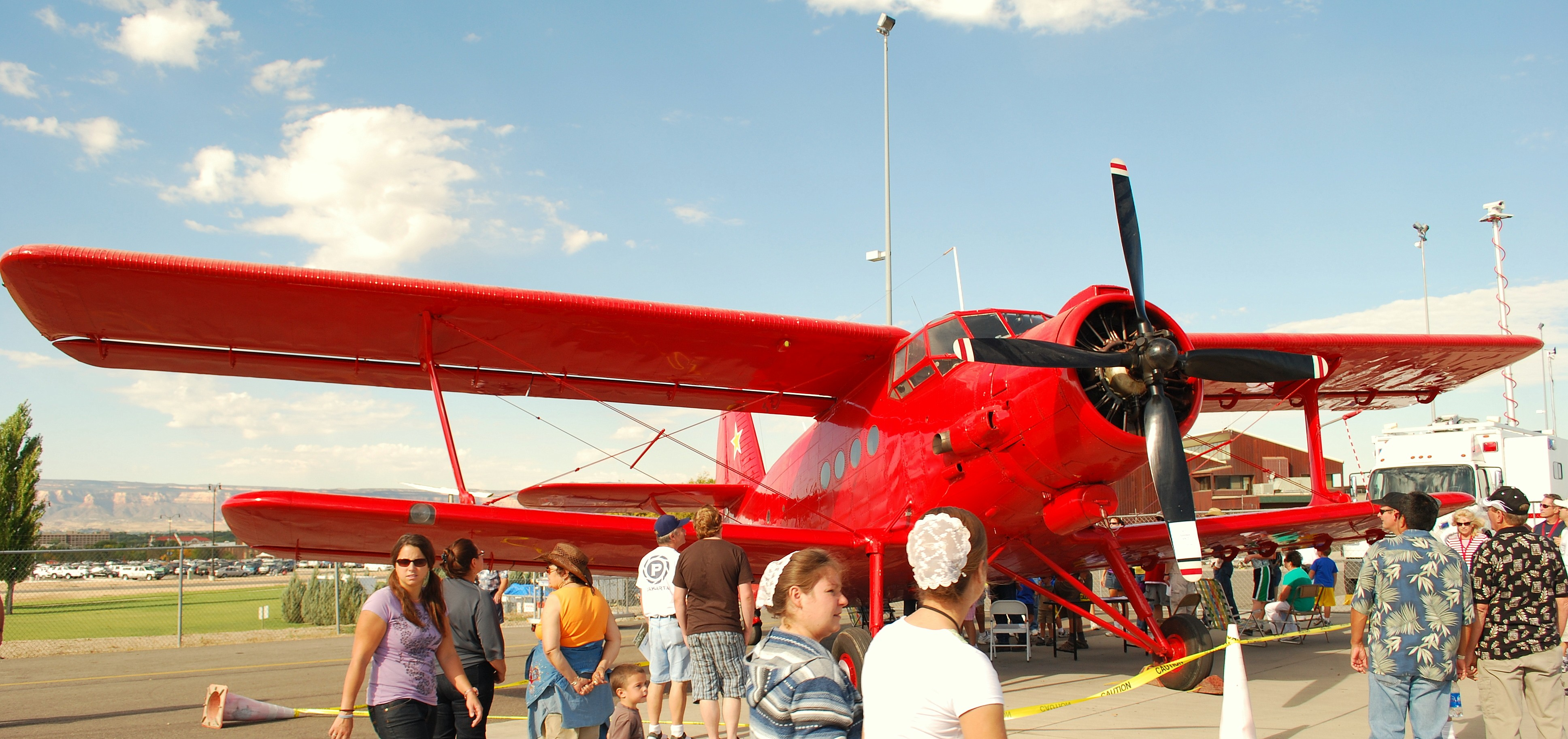
An-2 at Grand Junction aviation show

The An-2 is a mass-produced single-engine biplane that was deliberately furnished with a minimum of complex systems. The wing leading edge slats that give the aircraft its slow flight ability are fully automatic, being held shut by the airflow over the wings. When airspeed drops below 64 km/h (40 mph), elastic rubber springs extend the slats. Under typical conditions, take-off can be made within 170 m (560 ft) while the landing run requires 215 m (705 ft). These figures vary dependent on weight, air temperature, runway surface, and wind direction.

The An-2 is equipped with features which make it suitable for operation in remote areas with unimproved airstrips. It is fitted with a pneumatic brake system similar to those used on heavy trucks to stop on short runways, along with an air line attached to the compressor, so the pressure in the tires and shock absorbers can be adjusted. The batteries, while sizable, are easy to remove, and it does not need a ground power unit for starting the engine. Likewise, there is no need for an external fuel pump to refuel the aircraft as it is provided with its own.

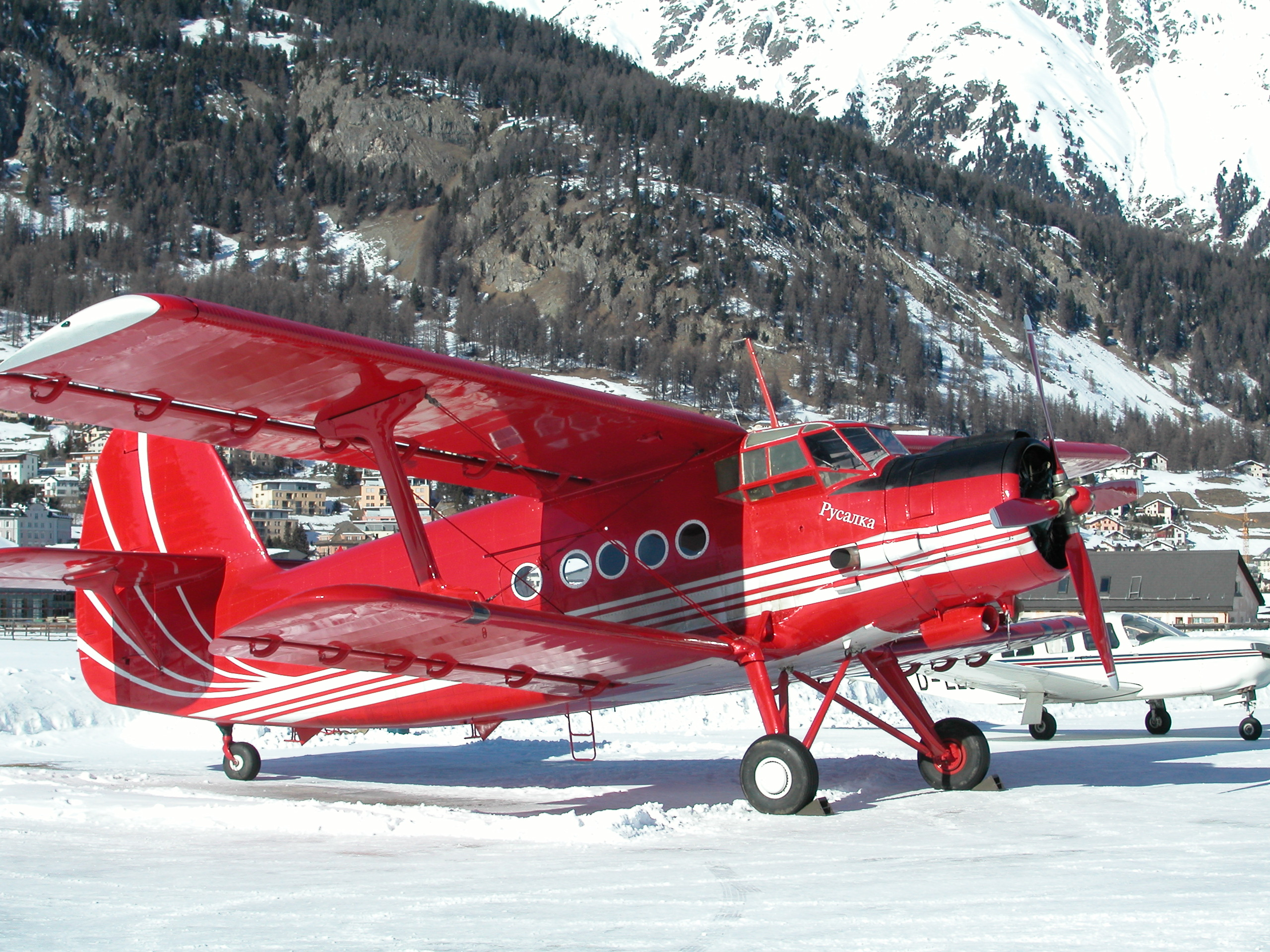
An An2-TP

The operating handbook does not explicitly specify a stall speed, stating instead: "If the engine quits in instrument conditions or at night, the pilot should pull the control column full aft and keep the wings level. The leading-edge slats will snap out at about 64 km/h (40 mph) and when the airplane slows to a forward speed of about 40 km/h (25 mph), the airplane will sink at about a parachute descent rate until the aircraft hits the ground."

The low stall speed makes it possible for the aircraft to fly backwards relative to the ground under high wind conditions while under control.

Many western countries prohibit the use of the An-2 commercially because the aircraft has not been certified by the relevant national aviation authorities. These restrictions vary by country, but all prevent the An-2 being used for any commercial purpose, with the exception of the United States, where PZL-built An-2s are exempt from this restriction due to a bilateral agreement with Poland. Other An-2s are operated non-commercially under an experimental certification.

== Operational history ==
=== Military service ===
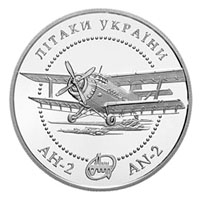
Ukrainian hryvnia depicting the An-2 airplane

The An-2 was operated in large numbers by the Soviet Air Force and Eastern Bloc forces. Its first military use was during the Korean War of the early 1950s.

The Vietnam People's Air Force (VPAF) operated the An-2 during the Vietnam War and occasionally used the type as an attack aircraft. During the 1960s, a single An-2 that was engaging South Vietnamese naval units was shot down by a United States Air Force McDonnell Douglas F-4 Phantom II fighter.

On 12 January 1968, a clandestine TACAN site (call sign: Lima Site 85/Phou Pha Ti) installed by the United States Air Force in Northern Laos for directing USAF warplanes flying from Thailand to Vietnam was attacked by three North Vietnamese An-2s. A pair of An-2s fired on the outpost using a mixture of machine guns and rockets while a third An-2 orbited overhead. An Air America Bell UH-1B resupplying the site gave chase to the attacking aircraft. Using an AK-47, the American crew (Ted Moore Captain, Glen Wood Kicker) succeeded in shooting down one of the An-2s while the second aircraft was forced down by combined ground and air fire, eventually crashing into a mountain. The surviving Antonov returned to its home base, Gia Lam, near Hanoi.

During the Croatian War of Independence in 1991, a number of elderly An-2s previously used for crop-spraying were converted by the Croatian Air Force to drop makeshift barrel bombs. They were also used to conduct supply missions to besieged parts of Croatia.

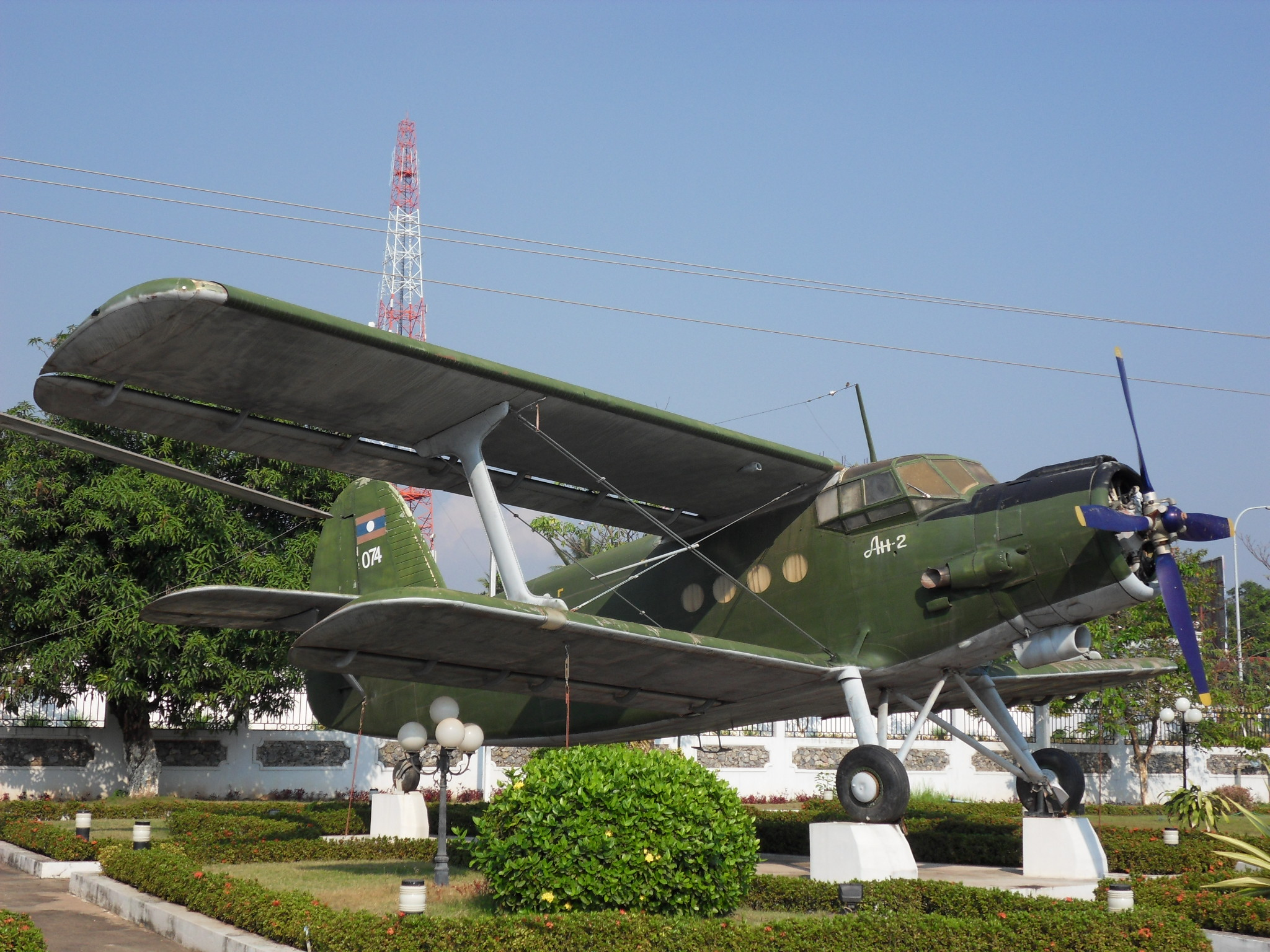
An AN-2 of the Laos air force

The chief advantage of the An-2 was its ability to operate from small improvised airstrips. They frequently dropped supplies by parachute to isolated garrisons. At least one An-2 was shot down on 2 December 1991 over Vinkovci, eastern Slavonia, by a Serbian salvo of SA-6 surface to air missiles.

North Korea has also operated An-2s. The Korean People's Army Special Operation Force has used the An-2 to infiltrate paratroopers.

During the 2020 Nagorno-Karabakh war, Azerbaijan operated unmanned An-2s for surveillance and bombing of Armenian defenses, however the type of the drone was unknown as of October 2020. Armenian forces revealed footage of the alleged shootdown of an Azerbaijani An-2, according to video evidence at least 11 An-2 have been destroyed, with 10 confirmed as shot down and one crashing after takeoff.

On March 2, 2022, Russian An-2s were observed at Seshcha Air Base, Bryansk Oblast. As the base is close to the Ukraine border, it was speculated that the aircraft were to be used in the 2022 Russian invasion of Ukraine.

=== Civil aviation ===
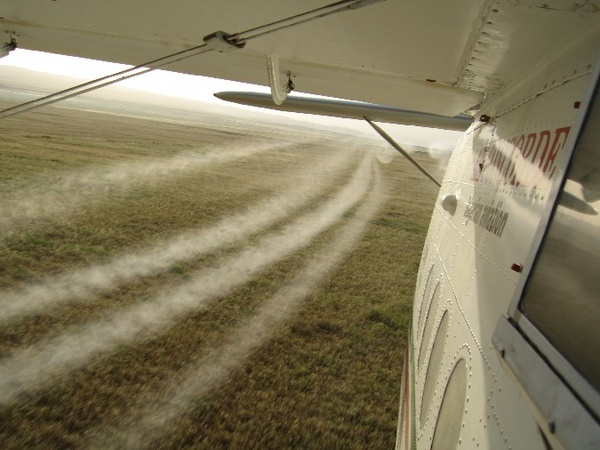
An-2 sprays pesticide on wheat crops during Operation Barnstormer (May 2006).

Over the years, dozens of nations and companies have employed the An-2 in civil roles. The type was heavily used throughout the Soviet Union and the Eastern Bloc nations. In particular, the Russian airline Aeroflot operated a large number of them. The An-2 was used as a short-range airliner, and in Estonia, made regular flights between the towns of Kuressaare and Kärdla, which are on separate islands, Saaremaa and Hiiumaa.

Since the collapse of the Soviet Union, most airlines in these regions have been retiring their An-2s, as some were over 40 years old, as well as a result of the decline in the production of avgas to fuel the type. Private operators are still using An-2s, as they remain popular for some functions, such as for skydiving.

High noise levels, maintenance costs and fuel consumption has rendered them obsolete for the majority of commercial routes in Europe, but the large number available mean that unit prices are low in comparison to alternatives (as little as US$30,000 for a serviceable example). Price has made them attractive in the developing world, where their abilities makes them an asset to airlines on a budget. Many ex-Aeroflot An-2s have found work with regional operators across Africa, Central and South America, Cuba and southeast Asia.

As of 2015, there were thousands of An-2s in operation around the world, including over 1,500 in Russia, 294 in Kazakhstan and 54 in Ukraine.

In September 2024, Vladimir Putin ordered the UZGA LMS-901 Baikal aircraft into production as a replacement. However, certification of that aircraft's Klimov VK-800SM engine is not expected until 2025, with engine deliveries not starting until 2026.

== Variants ==
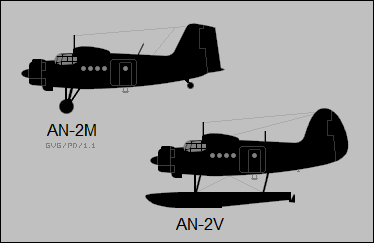
An-2 variants

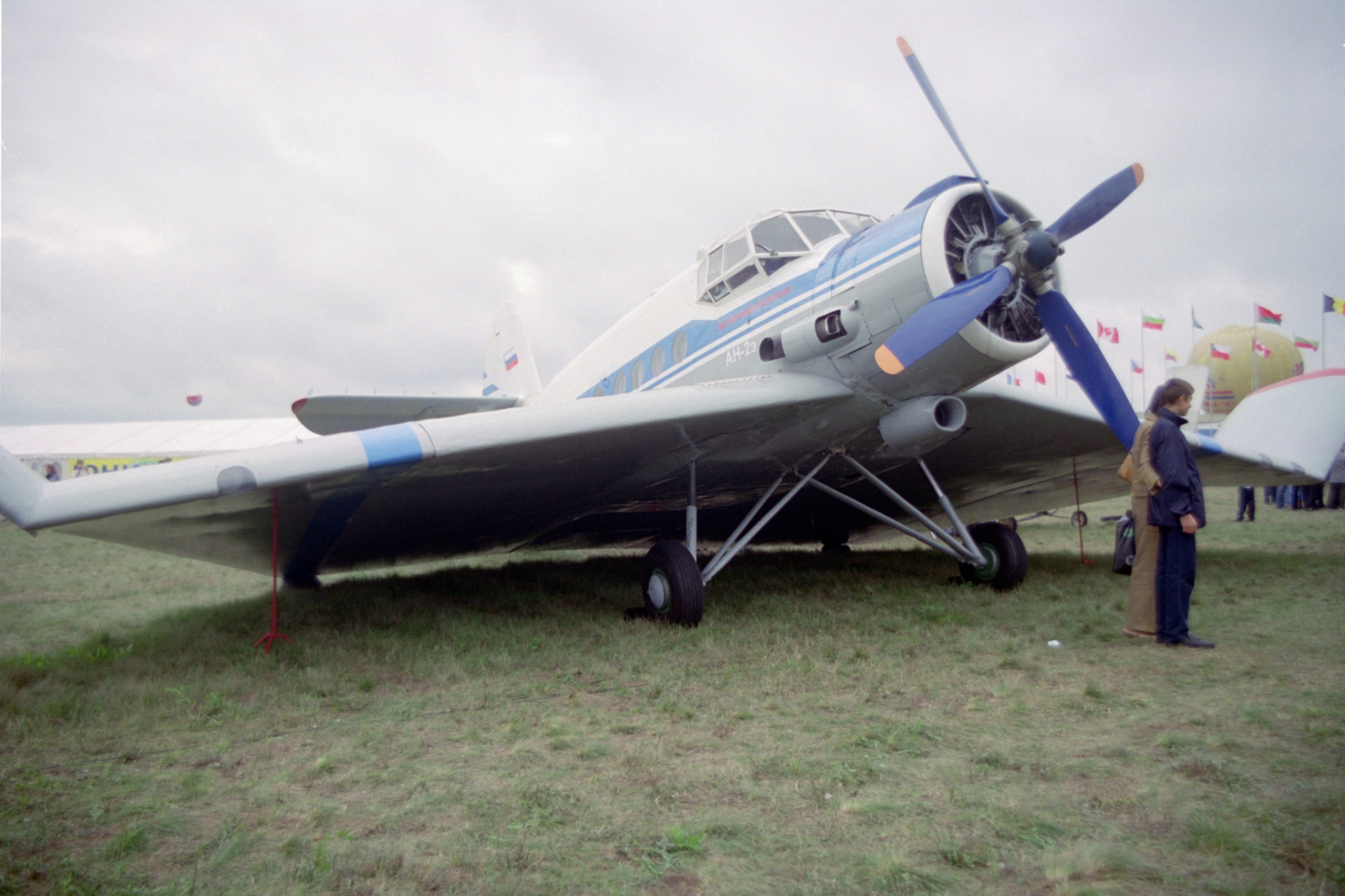
An-2E WIG

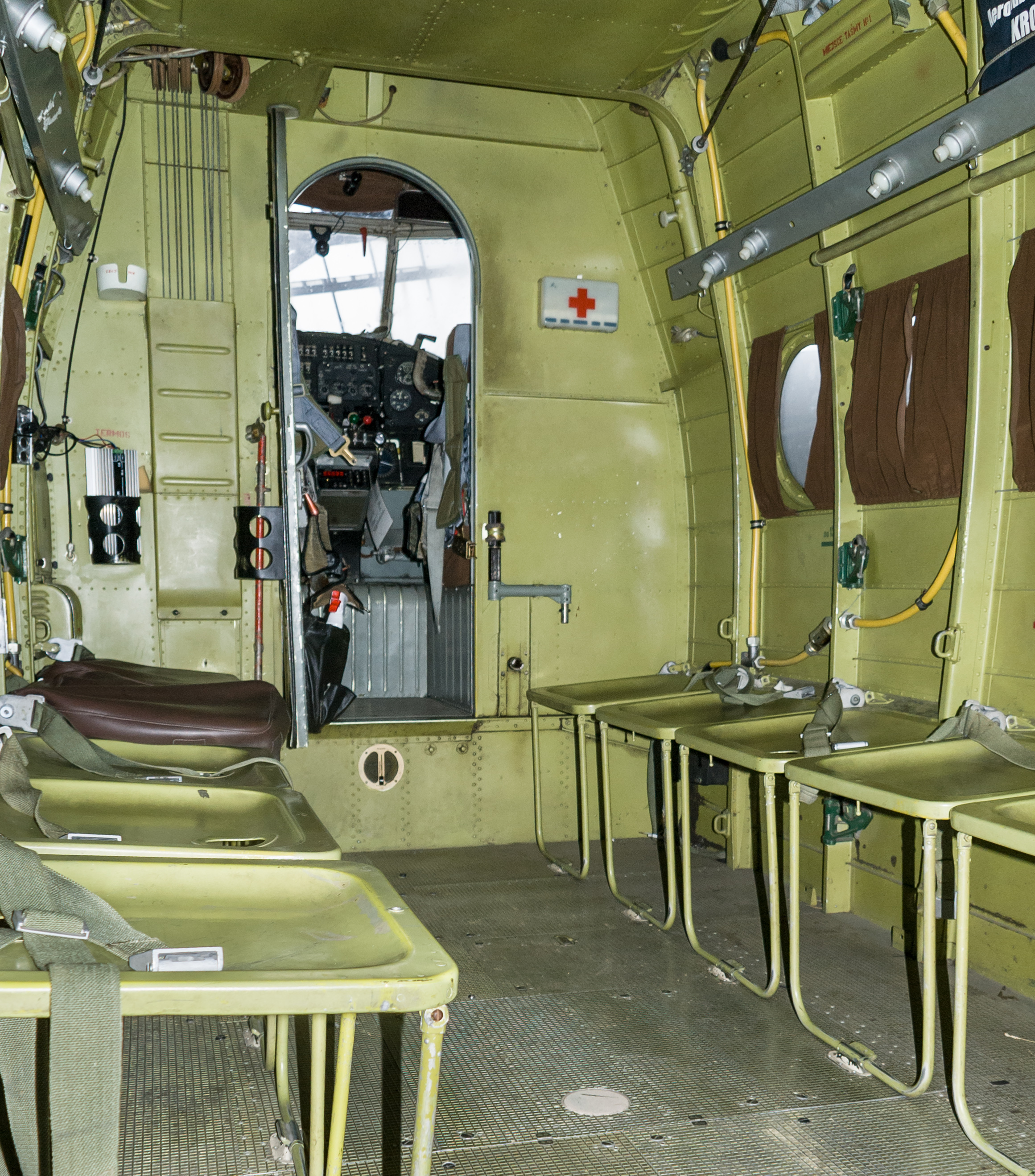
The passenger cabin

=== Soviet / Polish production ===
==== Prototype ====
- Izdeliye F – The in-house designation for the An-2NAK observation aircraft which was later re-designated An-2K and/or An-2F.
- Izdeliye K – A prototype weather reconnaissance/research aircraft with an observers cockpit immediately forward of the fin above the rear fuselage. First flown on 21 March 1948 'Izdeliye K' was found to be under-powered and unable to carry out its intended mission at high altitude, the aircraft was abandoned after a landing accident in October 1948. The concept was resurrected in 1954 as the 'An-2ZA' / 'An-6 Meteo'.
- Izdeliye T – The original design concept originated at OKB-153 in Novosibirsk.
- Izdeliye Sh – The in-house designation for the 'Izdeliye T' (presumably to confuse spies or infiltrators) design project at Novosibirsk.
- SKh-1 – the original designation of the An-2 used during the design phase of the project before the OKB had been named after Antonov.
- An-2A – Developed from the An-2T for use as a Balloon interceptor to intercept reconnaissance balloons from, US intelligence assets, over-flying the USSR. The prototype was converted from a Kyiv built An-2 (c/n 110347315) using the Turbo-charged Ash-62IR/TK of the 'An-6 Meteo' and a combined searchlight/gun turret mounted on top of the rear fuselage, which mounted either a single Gryazev-Shipunov GSh-23 23 mm calibre twin-barrelled cannon or a single Afanas'yev A-12.7 12.7 mm calibre heavy machine-gun.
- An-2E (Ekranoplan – wing in ground effect)
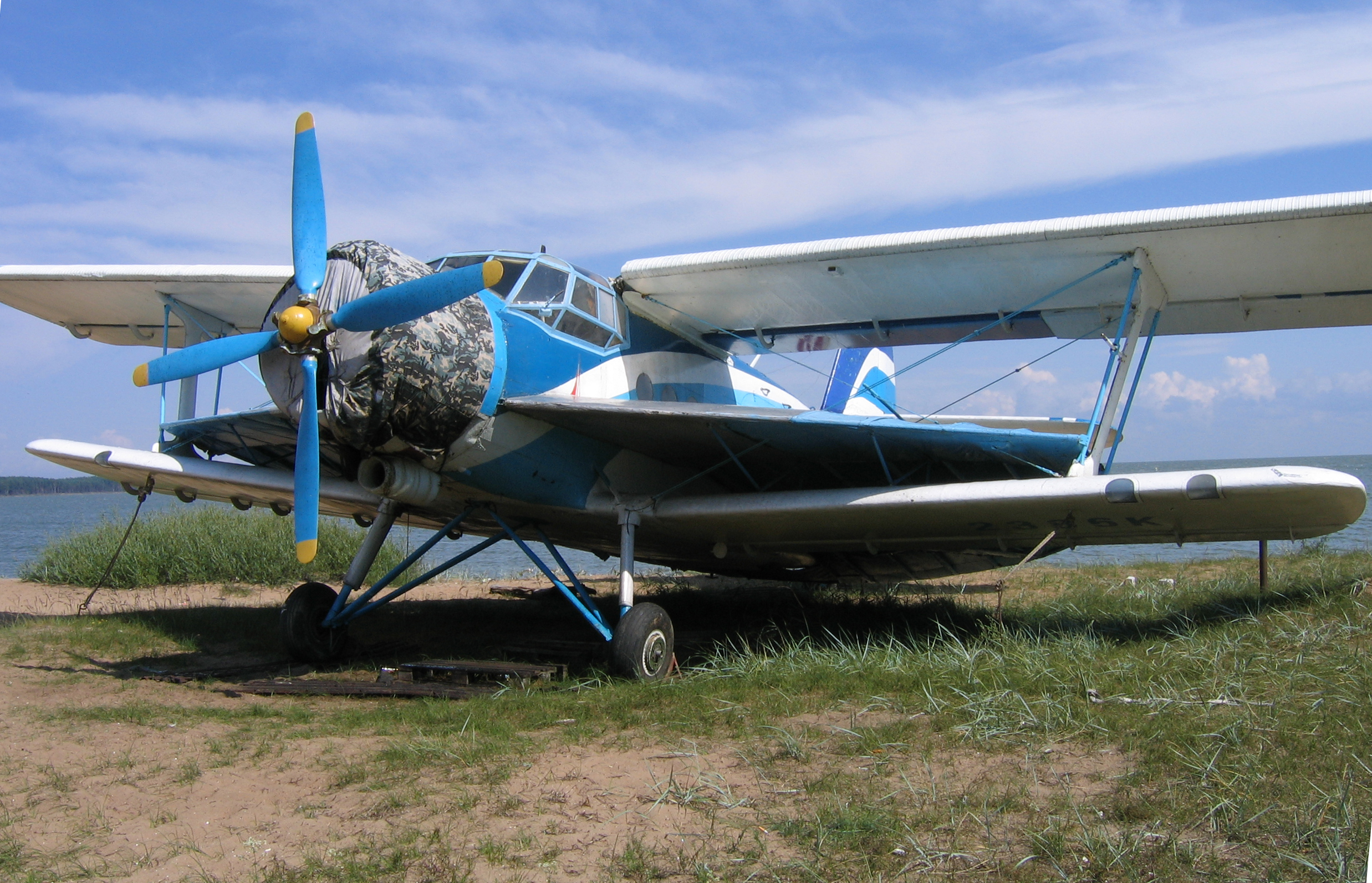
  The An-2E prototype ekranoplan
  (first use of the designation) – One of a series of projects from the early 1970s for WIG (Wing In Ground effect) derivatives of the An-2, designed at the TsLST (Tsentral'naya Laboratoriya Spasatel'noy Techniki – central laboratory for new types of rescue equipment).
- An-2E (second use of the designation) – An Ekranoplan conversion (Russian: Ан-2Э) of an An-2P (RA-84692). The fuselage was retained and a large trapezoidal monoplane wing having extended wingtips with approx 45° dihedral, attached to the lower wing attachment points. The prototype conversion was intended to be a floatplane; however, its first public appearance was as a landplane with the standard An-2 undercarriage. Jointly developed by the Moscow Aviation Institute, MARZ (Moskovskiy Aviaremontnyy Zavod – Moscow Aircraft Overhaul Plant) and The TSZP-Saturn research institute the An-2E was also known as EA-00078. Power was supplied by the standard ASh-62IR radial engine with AV-2 propeller, but production versions were intended to be powered by automotive diesel engines of around 430 kW (580 hp).
- An-2F – Developed concurrently with the An-2 prototype, 'Izdeliye F' was an experimental artillery-observation aircraft with a twin-tail, ventral observer's position and dorsal defensive machine-gun position. The initial service designation of An-2NAK was changed to An-2F once post test flight modifications had been carried out. Two prototypes were built, with the first completed in the summer of 1948, but flight testing was delayed to April 1949 due to the need to incorporate modifications called up from the standard An-2 flight test programme. The flight test of the An-2F showed that the aircraft met all the requirements of the specification, but helicopters were demonstrating that they could perform the artillery correction role without the need to provide fixed base airstrip for them to operate from, thus the An-2F was not proceeded with and the two prototypes were retained by the Antonov bureau for hack duties with one later serving as a flying wind tunnel to investigate para-dropping from the Antonov An-8 twin-turboprop transport.
- An-2F (second use of designation) – A VTOL project with vertical thrust to be provided by a Mikulin AM-9 turbojet in the rear fuselage.
- An-2F (third use of the designation) – A proposed photo-mapping aircraft project, from the early 1990s, similar to the An-2PF equipped with one of five alternate cameras. Overall control was to have been by IBM 286 computer and the camera could be augmented or replaced by a thermal imaging system, Infra-Red imaging system, AP-6E autopilot, LDI-3 laser rangefinder and/or a GPS global positioning system.
- An-2G (a.k.a. An-2Geo) – During 1974 WSK-Mielec developed a geo-physical survey aircraft for the Polish State Geophysical Survey Agency (Państwowe Przedsiębiorstwo Poszukiwań Geofizycznych), with equipment for measuring magnetic fields, radiation and other instruments for prospecting. Adapted to fly in tropical latitudes at low altitude the 'An-2G' could fly for six hours and two were used for survey work in Nigeria in 1974.
- An-2LP (Lesopozharnyy – forest firefighter) – A single prototype converted from an An-2V floatplane, with 630 litre(139 Imp.Gal.) water tanks in each float for dropping on fires. The water tanks could be re-filled in flight, as the aircraft skimmed the surface of suitable bodies of water. Prior to dropping an alkaline wetting agent (NP-1 Sulphanol) was added to the water which was released through the scoops which also picked up the water to refill the tanks. Ten production aircraft were built seeing service in the Siberian and Far East regions of the USSR.

==== An-2 ====
- An-2L (Lesozashchita – forestry protection) – A fire bomber variant with three cassettes each holding 120 ampoules, containing 1litre (34 fl.oz.) of fire-retardant which were dropped as required. Trials revealed that this system was inefficient and further work was abandoned.
- An-2LL (Letayuschaya Laboratoriya – flying laboratory) – Any of a number of An-2s used as testbeds for various equipment. One An-2SKh (RA-70547), modified by the State Research Institute of Aircraft Systems. (GosNII AS – Gosudarstvennyy Nauchno-Issledovatel'skiy Institut Aviatsionnykh Sistem), for environmental research, had a lateral observation blister which has often caused the aircraft to be misidentified as an An-2PF.
- An-2LV (Lesnoj Vodnyj – forest hydroplane) – A firefighting waterbomber.
- An-2M (Polish:[samolot] Morski – seaplane) – Polish production of the An-2V floatplane, designated An-2M, (not to be confused with the Soviet designation An-2M). Also known as the An-2W.
- An-2M (Modifitsirovannyy – modified) – The designation An-2M was also used in the USSR for a much improved agricultural crop-sprayer/duster. The An-2M featured an all-duralumin welded and bonded fuselage, lockable tailwheel, enlarged fibre-glass hopper, Shvetsov ASh-62 radial engine with power take off to an auxiliary gearbox to drive the dusting/spraying equipment, an angular fin of increased area and a hermetically sealed cockpit with no access to the cabin/hopper area. The hopper capacity was increased 42% to 2,000 litres (440 Imp.gal.) delivering product through an outlet enlarged to 400 mm (15 1/2 in) with dry product being fed to two dusting outlets at the tips of the lower wings. Due to lack of capacity at the Kyiv factory and WSK-Mielec the An-2M was manufactured at DMZ N0.464 (Dolgoproodnyy Machinery Factory No.464) to the north of Moscow.
- An-2P (Polish: Pasażerski – passenger) (Russian: Passazhirskiy – passenger) – Soviet and Polish production of a standard passenger variant. Soviet production An-2P's had 10 permanently installed seats in a heated insulated cabin. Polish production aircraft had 12–14 seats, two jump seats for children and a baby cot. A total of 837 An-2P's were built.
- An-2P (Protivopozharnij – fire-fighting with water) – A fire-fighting aircraft with a dumpable hopper filled with water and/or retardant.
- An-2PD-5 (Polish: Pasażerski [samolot] Dyspozycyjny – executive aircraft's) – The production version of the 'An-2PD-6', featuring almost identical interior furnishings with a work table and reading light replacing one of the chairs.
- An-2PD-6 (Polish: Pasażerski [samolot] Dyspozycyjny – executive aircraft's) – A prototype six seat VIP variant of the An-2P produced at WSK-Mielec in 1970, featuring a folding table, mini-bar, pantry and toilet.
- An-2PF – Soviet production An-2 aircraft configured for photo-mapping/survey tasks with camera hatches protected by sliding hatches on the undersurface of the fuselage.
- An-2PF – A joint request from the Polish State mapping Agency (Państwowe Przedsiębiorstwo Kartografii) led to Polish production of eight 'An-2PF' aircraft configured for photo-mapping/survey tasks with camera hatches protected by sliding hatches on the undersurface of the fuselage.
- An-2PK – A polar research aircraft developed by WSK-Mielec with heated skis, insulated cabin and an additional cabin heater.
- An-2PRTV – A single Polish production An-2, (SP-TVN, c/n1G 15944), modified as a television broadcast relay aircraft for the Polish Radio and Television Co. (Polskie Radio i Telewizja).
- An-2R (Polish: Rolniczy – agricultural) – WSK-Mielec manufactured agricultural variant with tank for 1,300 kg (2,900 lb) of liquid or powdered chemicals.
- An-2RA – A projected up-graded Agricultural aircraft, based on the An-2R, developed at WSK-Mielec.
- An-2RT (Russian: Rele Translyator – relay translator) – A single An-2 was converted to a telemetry relay station, for missile development work, relaying telemetry from test missiles to a ground station.
- An-2S (Sanitarnyy – medical) – The An-2S was an adaptation of the standard An-2T cargo plane with up to six stretcher patients or three stretchers and six walking wounded along with attendants and support equipment.
- An-2SKh (Sel'skoKhozyaistvennyy – agricultural) – The agricultural version optimised for crop-spraying and crop-dusting. A metal construction chemical hopper was installed in the cabin near the centre of gravity, feeding a spreader through a 300mm orifice. The original spreader was replaced in 1975 by a standardised RTSh-1 three channel spreader which increased distribution width from 18–22 m (59–72 ft) to 34–36 m (112–118 ft). Liquid chemicals could be sprayed using an interchangeable system which delivered chemical to spraybars via a ram air turbine driven regulator pump to give coverage 30 m (98 ft) wide. Powdered or granulated chemicals were loaded through a hatch in the roof of the cabin and liquid chemical through a special connector on the port side of the fuselage. Early An-2SKh's were typically limited to a 6,000-hour life, as opposed to a normal life of 12,000 hours, due to the corrosive effects of the chemicals. The introduction of epoxy based corrosion protection systems partly alleviated the situation, allowing the agricultural An-2s to continue flying for much longer. Five An-2SKh aircraft were converted to firefighters, from 1954, by pressurising the hopper filled with water and/or retardant and ejecting it from a nozzle in place of the dusting/spraying equipment, single aircraft were allocated to Civil Air Directorates across the country but proved relatively ineffectual.
- An-2T (Transportnyy – cargo) – The baseline first production model for cargo and mail carriage.
- An-2TD (Transportno-Desantnyy – cargo/paratrooper) – paratrooper version with 12 seats, static line attachment cables and drop signalling lights.
- An-2TP (Transportno-Passazhirskiy – cargo/passenger) – A convertible passenger/cargo version, with tip-up seats for ten, released in 1949.
- An-2TPS (Transportno-Passazhirskiy Sanitarnyy – cargo/passenger medical) – Polish production of ambulance aircraft derived from An-2TP aircraft with three stretchers each side and two medical attendants.
- An-2V (Vodnyy – water-based) – A seaplane version of the baseline An-2 fitted with twin floats supported on wire-braced struts at the undercarriage attachment points and rear fuselage. Floatplane An-2s manufactured in Kyiv were designated An-4 but there is little evidence that this designation was widely used. At least one An-2V. AN-2V Video
- An-2V (Vysotnyy – high altitude) – Six aircraft were built, at the Kyiv factory, as weather reconnaissance An-2V's for use at high altitude. Powered by the ASh-62IR/TK turbo-charged engine, they differed from the 'An-6 Meteo' by not having the observers cockpit forward of the fin.
- An-2VA – water bomber.
- An-2W (Wodnosamolot – seaplane) – Polish production of the An-2V, also sometimes designated An-2M (not to be confused with the improved variant).
- An-2ZA (Zondirovaniye Atmosfery – atmosphere sampling) – The initial designation for a high altitude meteorological research re-designated as the 'An-6 Meteo'.
- An-3 (first use of the designation) – A radical redesign of the An-2A to intercept reconnaissance balloons from US intelligence assets, over-flying the USSR. With a high aspect ratio monoplane high-set wing, turbo-charged ASh-62IR/TK and a combined searchlight/gun turret mounted on top of the rear fuselage.

==== An-3 ====
- An-3 (second use of designation) – In an effort to replace the An-2SKh, after the poor performance of the abortive WSK-Mielec M-15 Belphegor, it was proposed to fit a turboprop engine on an all new fuselage featuring a hunchback for the cockpit and An-2M tail surfaces. This design was not carried through and a less ambitious re-design resulted in the third and final use of the An-3 designation.
- An-3 (third use of designation) – The prototype An-3 with a 1,054 kW (1,413 shp) Glushenkov TVD-20 turboprop engine, sealed cockpit with separate entrance door above lower wing leading edge and air conditioning to improve the cockpit environment. Two prototypes were built (CCCP-06131 and CCCP37901) with a third registration (CCCP26700) which is believed to be a re-registration of one of the other two registrations. The flight tests and trials progressed well and the two prototypes set no less than six World Records for payload to altitude in their class. Due to the collapse of the USSR initial plans for production and variants were shelved until 1993 when production of converted aircraft began, as the An-3T, at the Omsk 'Polyot' factory.
  - An-3T – Due to the large number of surplus An-2s available the An-3T was not produced from scratch but by converting aircraft which had at least 50% of their life remaining. All the aircraft were re-registered and given new construction numbers.
  - An-3TK – A convertible passenger /cargo version with six foldable twin seats.
  - An-3SKh – An agricultural version tested with one of the original prototypes but with no known production conversions.
  - An-3P – A forest fire fighting water bomber with a tank installed in the fuselage.
  - An-3S – A projected ambulance version with six stretchers and two medical attendants.
  - An-3D – Projected military troopship version with tip-up seats for paratroopers.

==== An-4 ====
- An-4 – This designation was used for An-2V seaplanes produced at Kyiv, but does not seem to be used much. This is either due to very limited production at Kyiv or operators not making the distinction between the An-2V and An-4.

==== An-6 ====
- An-6 – A transport aircraft fitted with the Shvetsov Ash-62IR/TK turbo-charged engine was produced for use in mountainous areas at high altitudes. An unknown number were delivered to the Tajik Civil Aviation Directorate and the Polar directorate for use in the far north of the USSR and to support the USSR's Antarctic research stations.
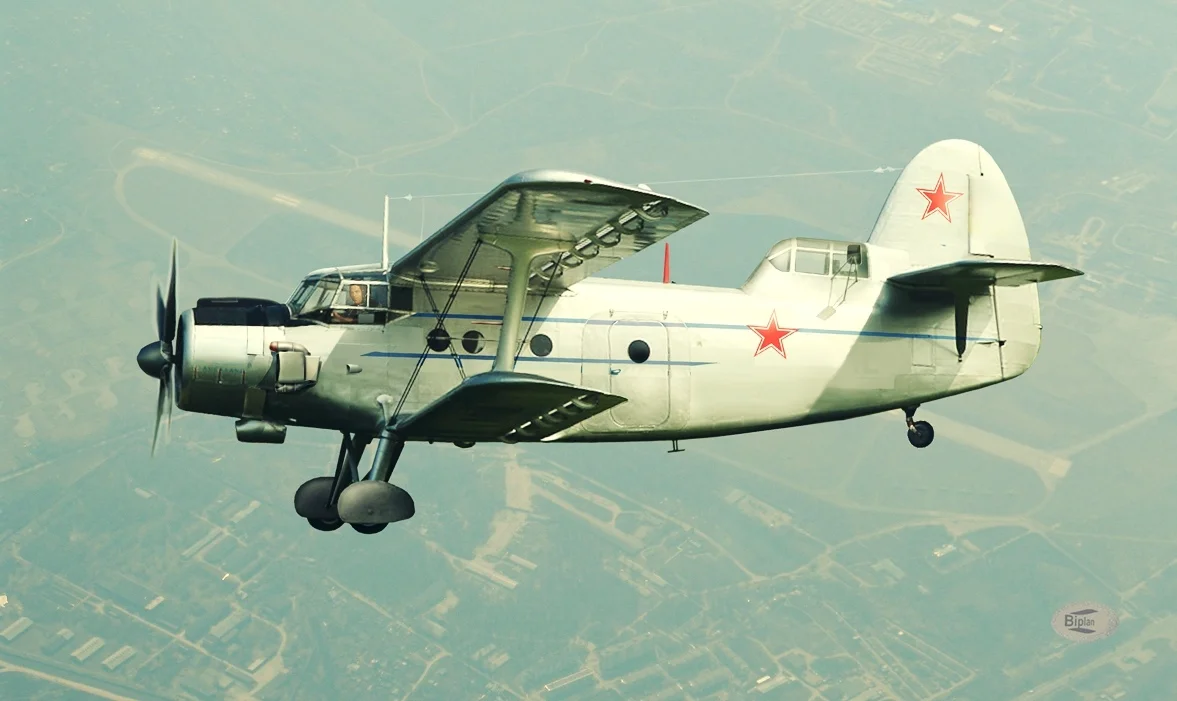
  An-6 Meteo
- An-6 Meteo – After the failure of 'Izdeliye K', the Antonov bureau was tasked with developing the 'An-2ZA' high-altitude weather reconnaissance aircraft based on the An-2. Featuring the same observers cockpit, forward of the vertical stabiliser above the rear fuselage, used on 'Izdeliye K', power was supplied by a turbo-charged Shvetsov Ash-62IR/TK which enabled the 'An-2ZA' to carry out its intended high-altitude research role. On 9 June 1954 OKB-153 test pilot V.A. Kalinin and Flight Engineer V.I. Baklaykin set a World altitude record for Class C-1e-1 (3,000–6,000 kg (6,600–13,200 lb)) at 11,248 m (36,903 ft) which had not been broken by 2004. The 'An-2ZA' was re-designated 'An-6 Meteo' early in its career and continued to fly until a take-off accident in September 1958 caused extensive damage.

==== others ====
- Grach-2 (Grach-Rook) – Students from the SKB MAI (Studencheskoye Konstruktorskoye Byuro Moskovskii Aviatsionii Institut [Sergo Ordjonikidze] – student construction bureau Moscow Aviation Institute [Sergo Ordjonikidze]) studied agricultural aircraft utilising the WIG effect. Their first effort, named Grach-2, was a standard An-2 fuselage mated to low-set inverted gull. reverse-delta monoplane wings with couter, constant chord, dihedral sections and fitted with a t-tail.
- Grach-3 – The second projected WIG agricultural aircraft from the SKB MAI was the Grach-3. This aircraft was to have been similar to the Grach-2 but utilising a centre section with near constant chord which allowed the tailplane to be dispensed with and pitch controlled by elevators at the rear of the centre section.
- Lala-1 – A research prototype with an open-frame rear fuselage, twin tail and twin tailwheels supported by struts under the rear of the fuselage pod. An Ivchenko AI-25 turbofan engine was fitted in the rear of the fuselage pod for use as a development model for the WSK-Mielec M-15 Belphegor agricultural aircraft.
- SibNIA TVS-2MS – Turboprop conversion of An-2 by Siberian Aeronautical Research Institute (SibNIA) using 820 kW (1,100 shp) Honeywell TPE331-12UHR engine. First flown 5 September 2011. Deliveries to the Aerial Forest Protection Service began in 2014, with six flying by August 2014 and 16 in service by early 2017.

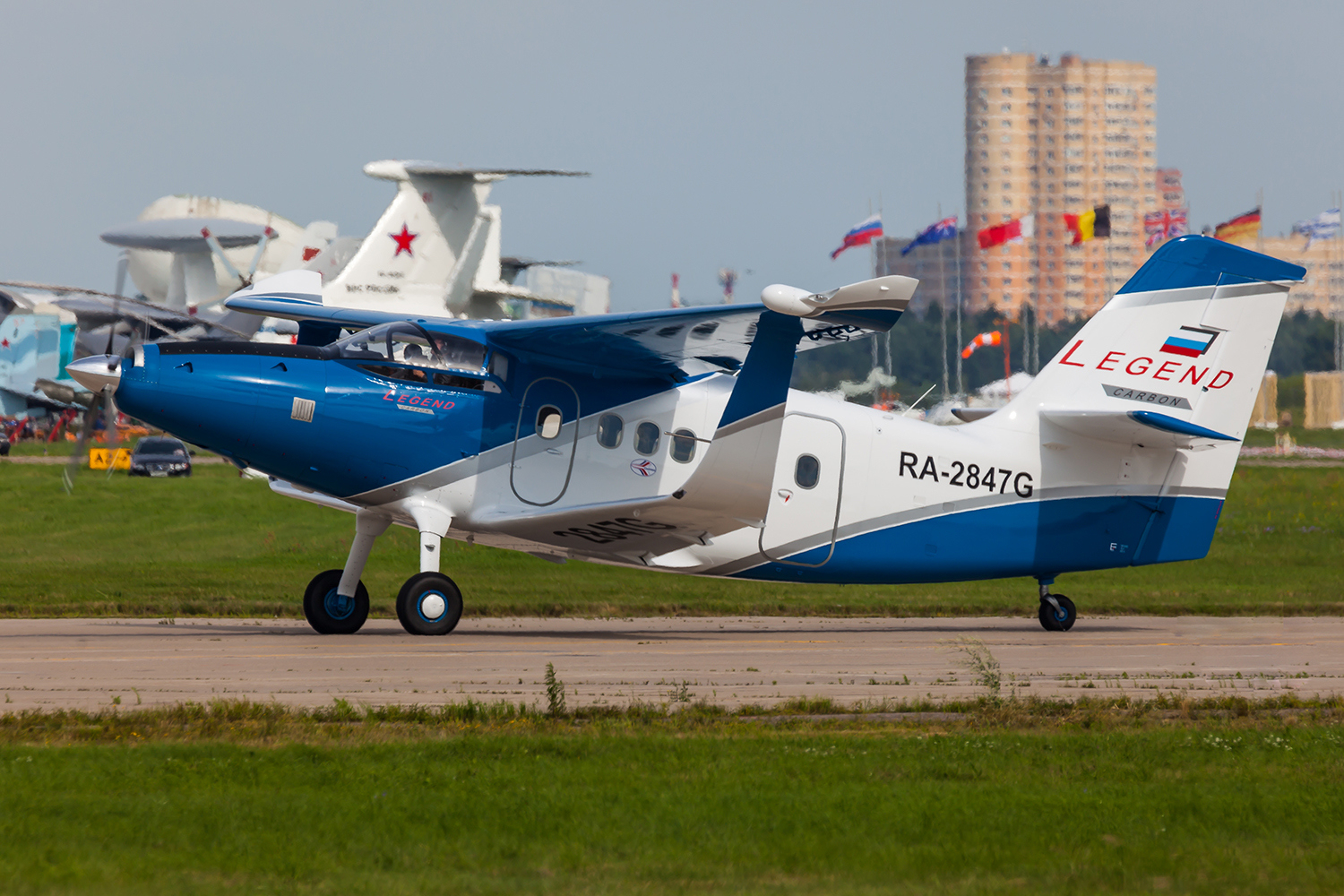
SibNIA TVS-2DTS

- SibNIA TVS-2-DT – Fitted with new composite wings (with no bracing struts or wires) and tail. First flight 10 June 2015.
- SibNIA TVS-2-DTS – TVS-2-DT fitted with new all-composite fuselage. Production planned at Ulan-Ude Aviation Plant from 2019 to meet a requirement for at least 200 aircraft to be delivered from 2021 to 2025.
- SibNIA TVS-2-DTS "Partizan" - unmanned version of the TVS-2-DTS

=== Chinese variants ===
- Feng Shou-2 (Harvester-2) – The name given to the first Nanchang built agricultural 'Y-5II'.
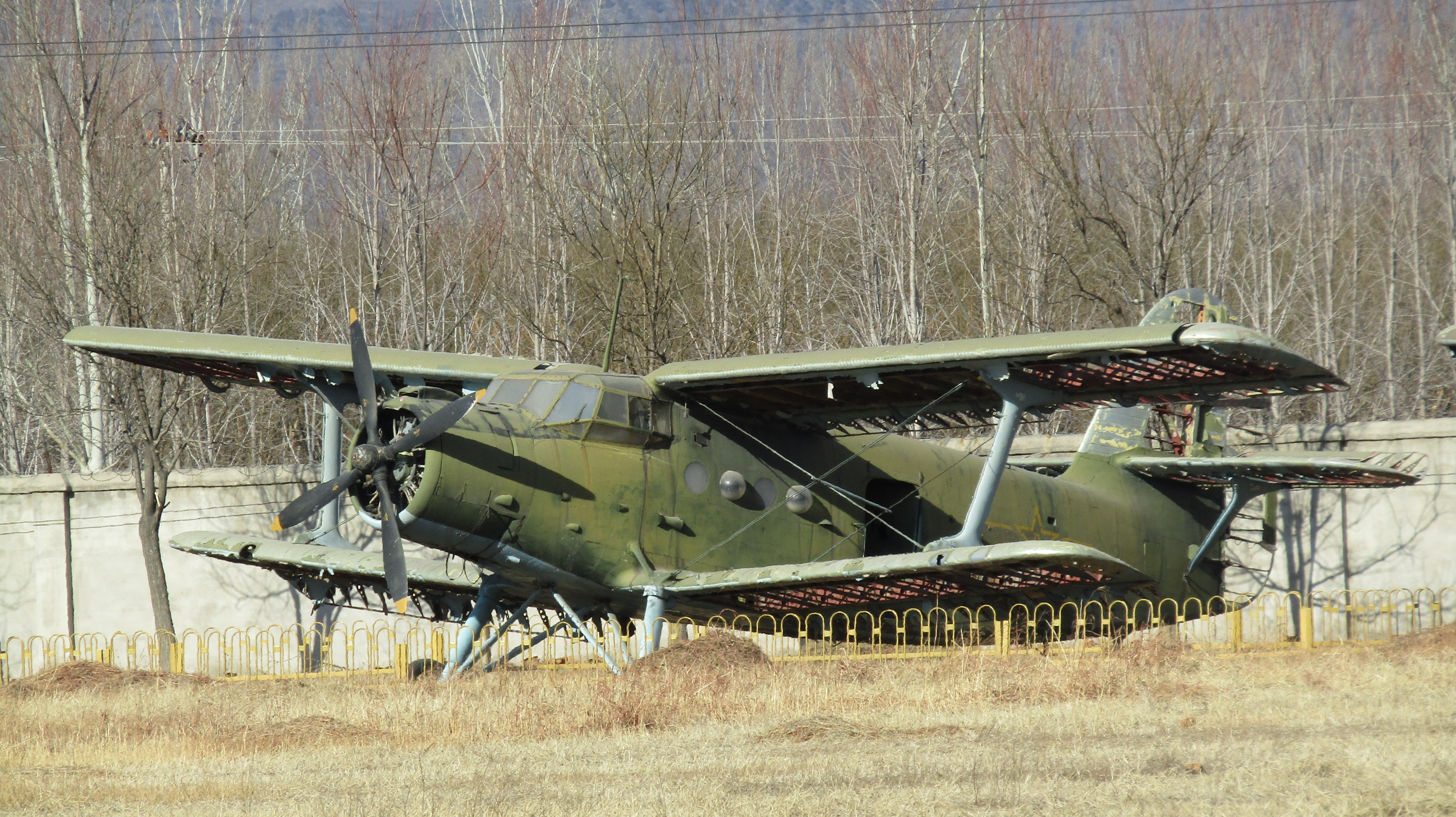
  Nanchang Y-5 at China Aviation Museum, Beijing
- Feihong-98 (FH-98) – Unmanned transport aircraft with a payload of 1.5 tonnes.
- Nanchang Y-5 – (Yunshuji – transport) Chinese version of An-2, initially built from Soviet blueprints and with supervision from Soviet advisors, 727 had been built when production was transferred to Harbin in 1968.
- Nanchang Y-5II – Crop-sprayer/duster with a chemical hopper/tank in the cabin and interchangeable spraying/dusting equipment. Cooling of the cockpit was increased to improve comfort in the sub-tropical regions of China. 229 built.
- Shijiazhuang Y-5A – First mass-produced, Shijiazhuang built, version, light passenger transport, equivalent to the An-2T, 114 built.
- Shijiazhuang Y-5B – Shijiazhuang built agricultural aircraft, equivalent to the An-2 SKh.
- Shijiazhuang Y-5B-100 – Y-5B aircraft fitted with triple tipsails on the upper wing tips, which reputedly gave 20% higher climb rate and improved L/D ratio by 15%.
- Shijiazhuang Y-5B(T) – A para-dropping version developed for the PLAAF, with up-dated avionics including a GPS.
- Shijiazhuang Y-5B(K) – Variously reported as a tourist variant or Agricultural variant.
- Shijiazhuang Y-5B(D) – Variously reported as an Agricultural variant or Tourist variant.
- Nanchang Y-5C – Amphibian version of Y-5A fitted with two floats.
- Nanchang Y-5D – Bomber crew trainer.

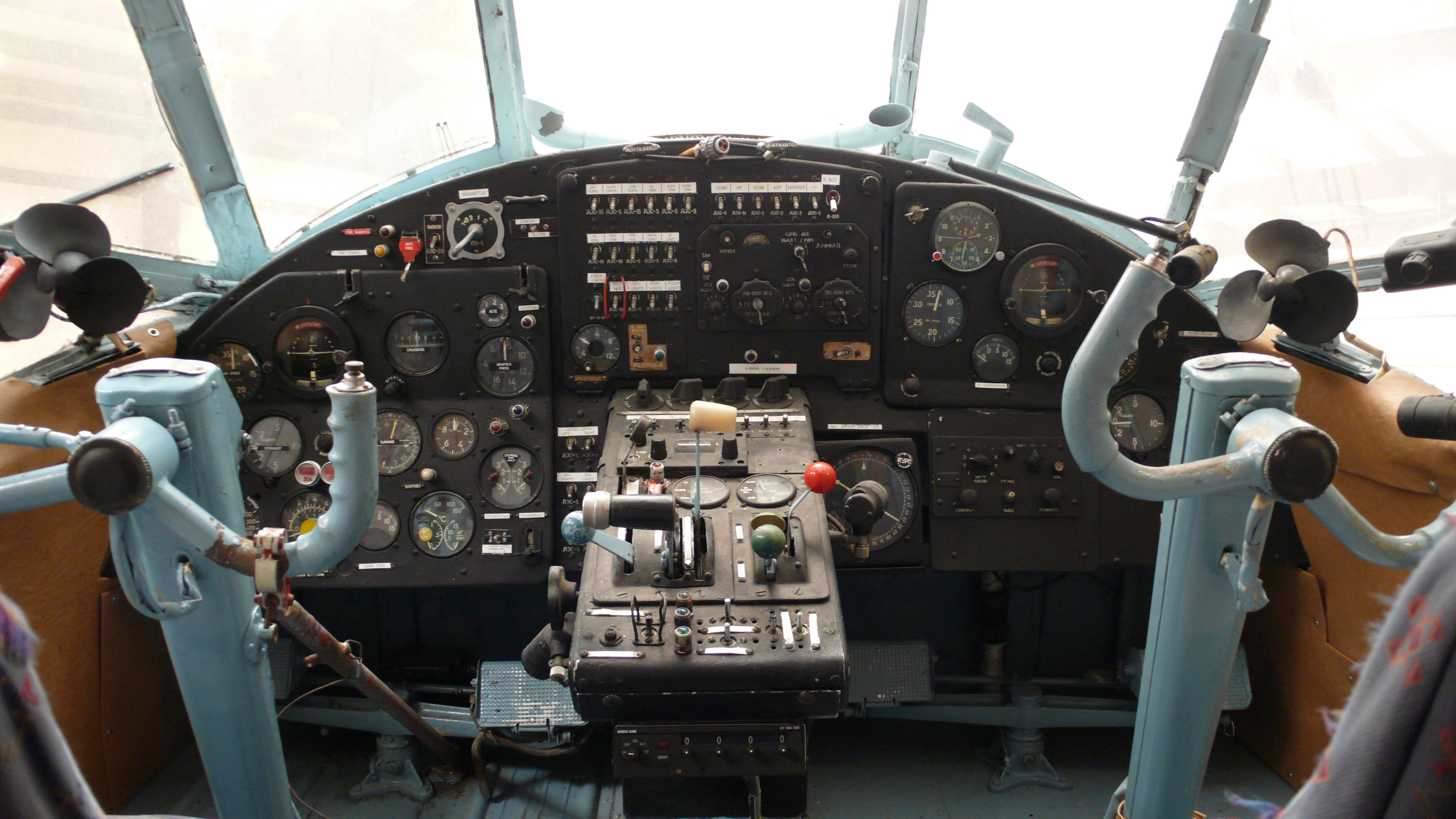
Cockpit of a 1971 ex-Aeroflot An-2 at the Historic Aircraft Restoration Museum. See also for a very high resolution image of this cockpit.

- Nanchang Y-5K – A VIP passenger variant with five seats. Eleven were delivered to the PLAAF from 1958. A seven seater was delivered to Ho Chi Minh in North Vietnam and two were given to the Nepal Royal Flight for use by King Birendra.
- Shijiazhuang Y-5B (turboprop) – A projected turboprop upgrade conversion programme replacing the 1,000 hp Huosai-5 radial engine with a more powerful turboprop.
- HY100 Large UAV - An unmanned aerial vehicle based on either the Shijiazhuang or Nanchang models. According to the manufacturer, the HY100 "is the first and only "large-scale" UAV approved by the Civil Aviation Administration of China," has a listed payload of 1900 kilograms, and can be equipped for roles including crop spraying, forestry monitoring, and aerial firefighting.

=== Ukrainian variants ===
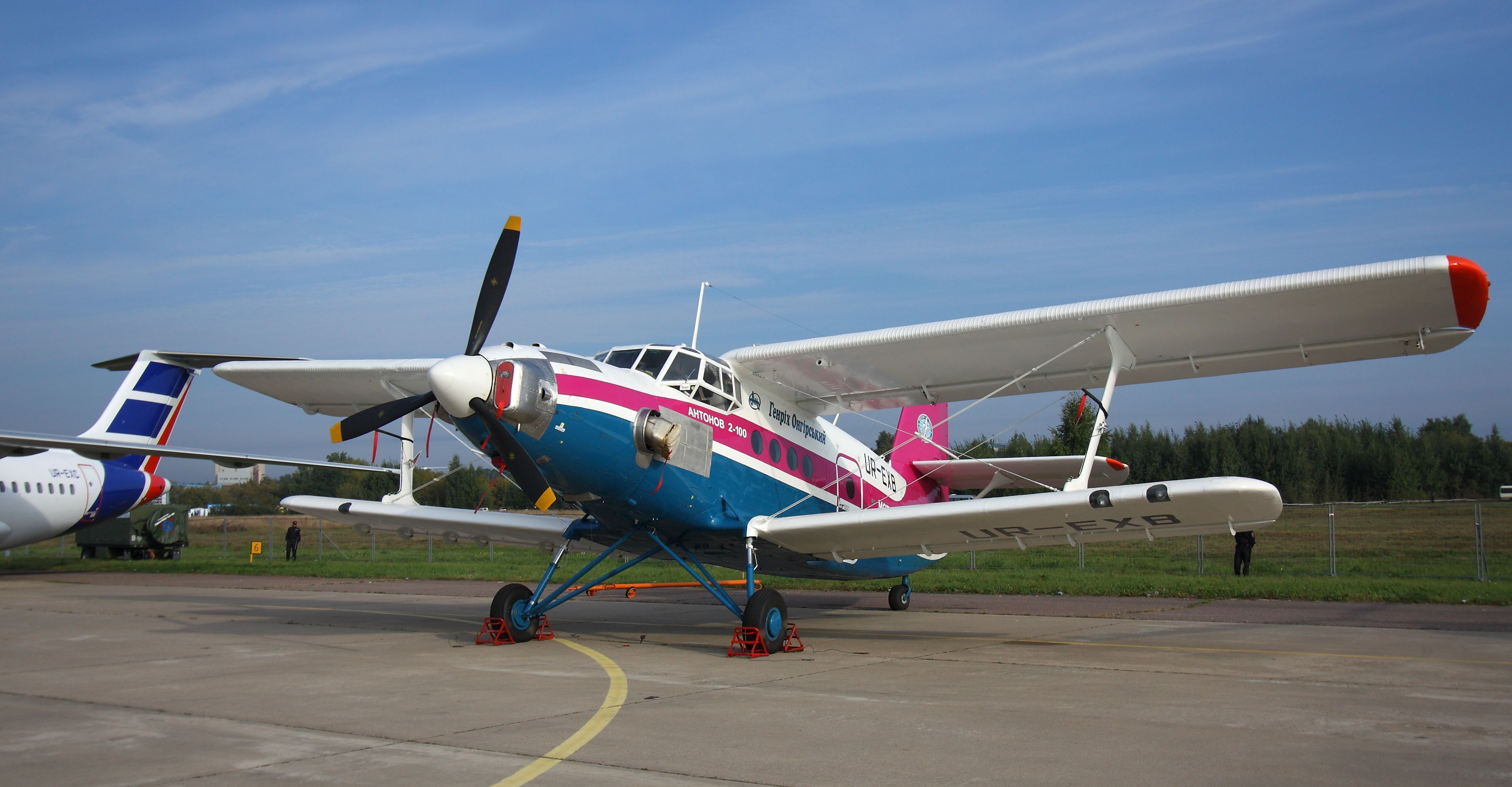
- AN-2-100
  An-2-100 – Modification of the design first flown in 2013 with a modern 3-bladed reversible propeller and a 1500shp Motor Sich Sich MS-14 turboprop engine running on kerosene rather than Avgas. First flew on 10 July 2013 in Kyiv

== Operators ==
The aircraft is popular with air charter companies, small airlines, private individuals and private companies, and is mainly used in post-Soviet states, Cuba, China and North Korea.

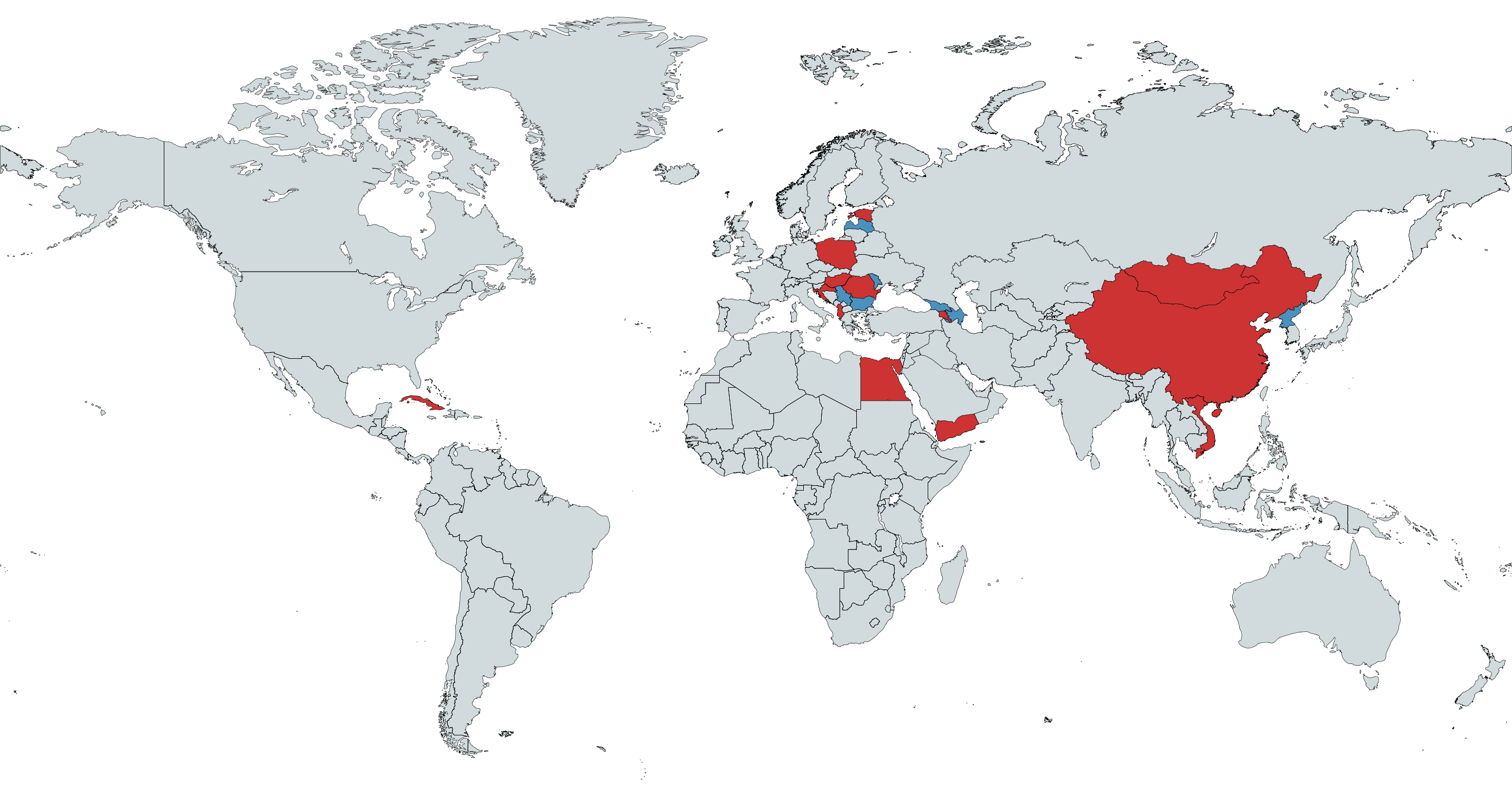
Map with An-2 users in blue and former users in red

=== Military operators ===
==== Current operators ====
Azerbaijan

- Azerbaijani Air Force

Bulgaria

- Bulgarian Air Force

Georgia

- Georgian Air Force

Latvia

- Latvian Air Force

Republic of Moldova

- Moldovan Air Force

North Korea

- Korean People's Air Force

Russia

- Russian Airborne Forces

Serbia

- Serbian Air Force and Air Defence

South Korea

- Republic of Korea Air Force − In service with aggressor squadrons

Transnistria

- Armed Forces of Transnistria

Ukraine

- Ukrainian Naval Aviation − In service of the 10th Naval Aviation Brigade

United States

- United States Air Force - Used by the 6th Special Operations Squadron for Combat Aviation Advisory Squadron, and to provide training.

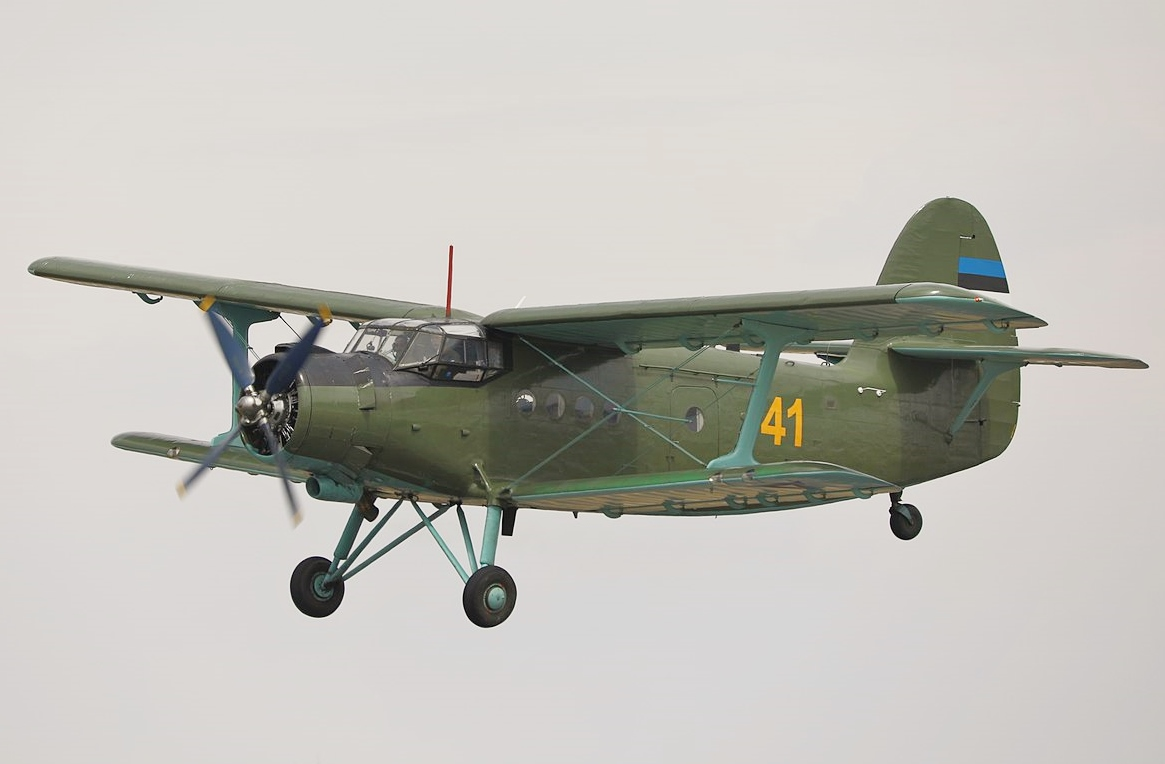
An-2 of the Estonian Air Force

==== Former operators ====
Albania

- Albanian Air Force

Armenia

- Armenian Air Force

China

- People's Liberation Army Air Force
- People's Liberation Army Naval Air Force

Croatia

- Croatian Air Force

Cuba

- Cuban Air Force

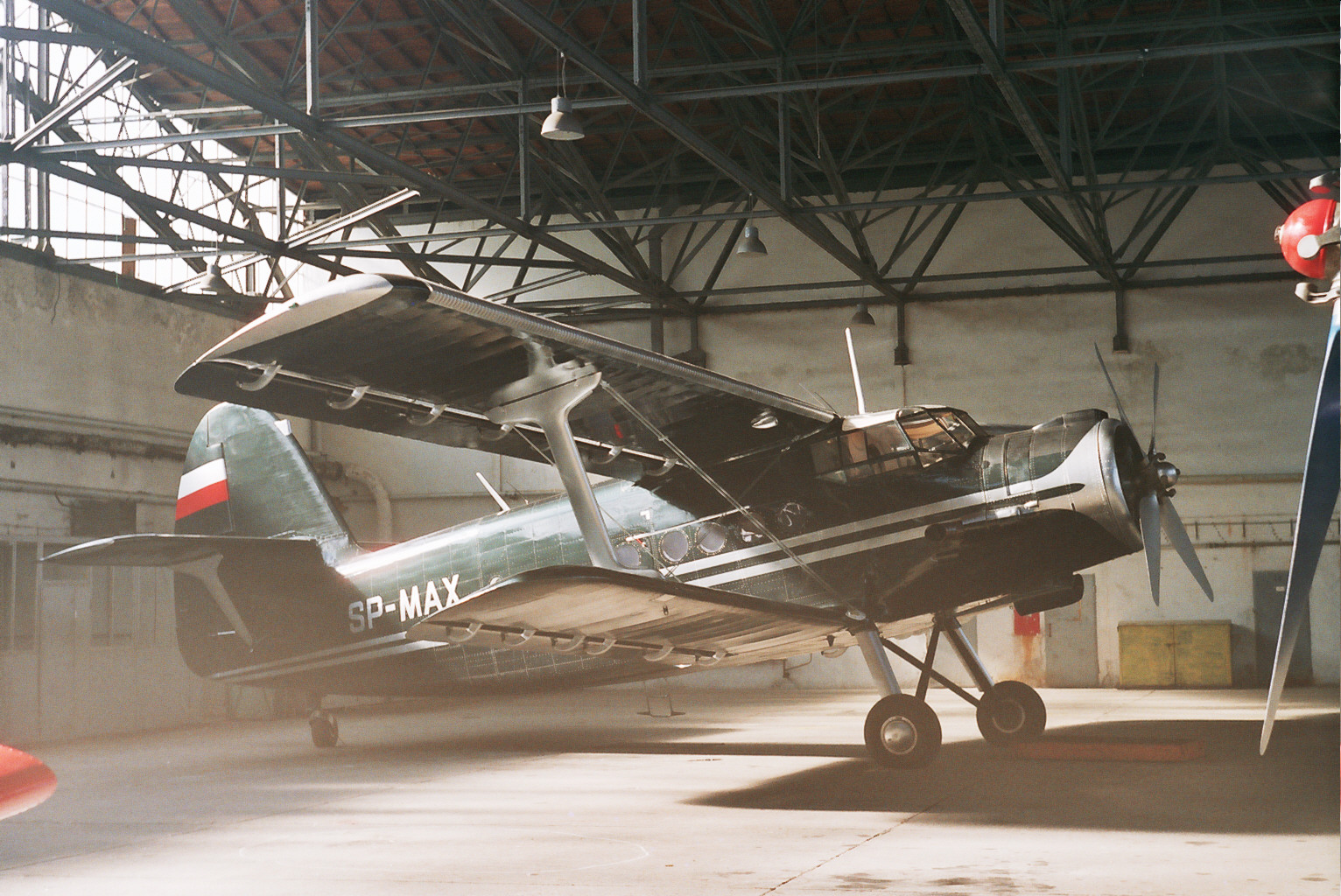
Antonov An-2

Egypt

- Egyptian Air Force

Estonia

- Estonian Air Force

East Germany

- Air Forces of the National People's Army

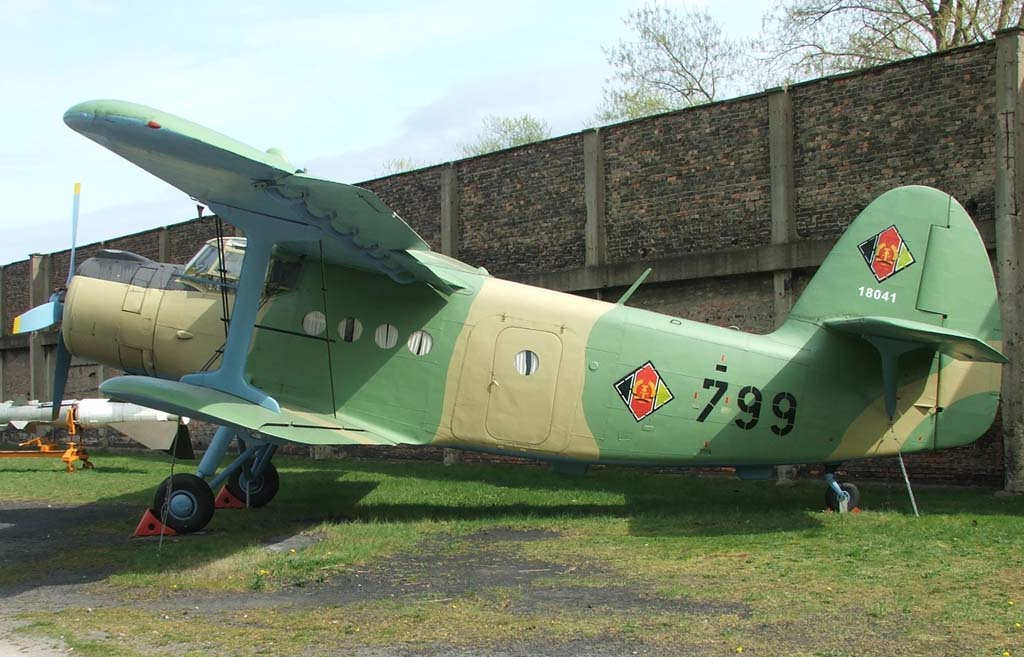
An-2 of the East German Air Force

Hungary

- Hungarian Air Force

Indonesia

- Indonesian Air Force − In service with Indonesian Aero Sport Federation (FASI)

Mongolia

- Mongolian People's Air Force

Poland

- Polish Air Force

Romania

- Romanian Air Force

Somalia

- Somali Air Force

Soviet Union

- Soviet Air Force
- Soviet Naval Aviation

Vietnam

- Vietnam People's Air Force

Yemen

- Yemen Air Force

== Accidents and incidents ==
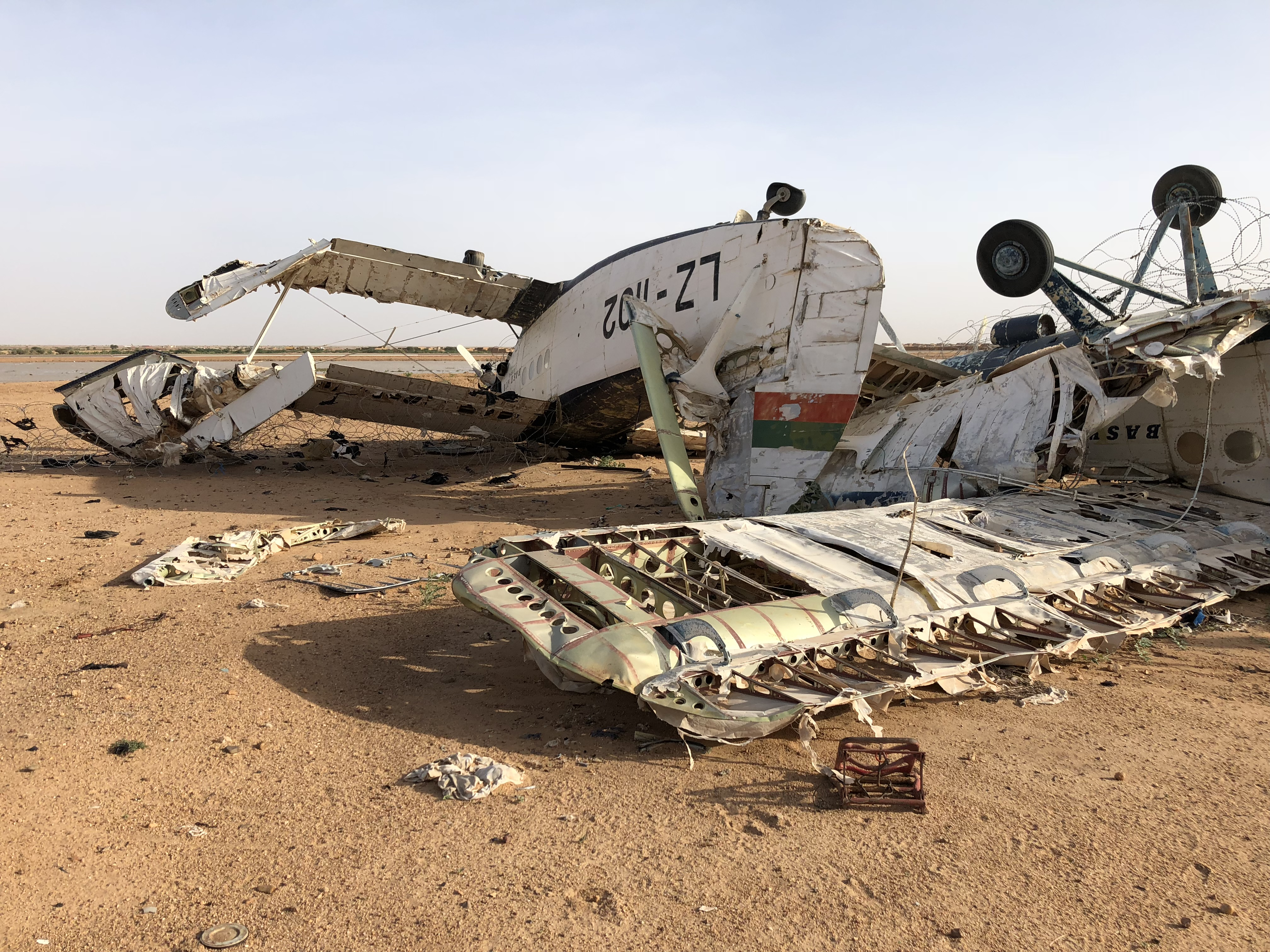
Two wrecked An-2R aircraft, both from Bask Air, at Agadez Airport in Niger

- On March 27, 1972, Timofei Shovkunov stole an An-2 and flew it directly into his apartment building in Voroshilovgrad (now Luhansk) apparently despondent after his wife having left along with his son the day before. He was the lone casualty.
- On 26 September 1976, Russian national Vladimir Serkov made an unauthorized takeoff with an An-2 (Reg # USSR-79868) from Novosibirsk-Severny Airport. He crashed it into the stairwell of an apartment complex at Stepnaya st., house 43 / 1, where his ex-wife's parents lived, in an attempt to kill his ex-wife. After completing two laps around the scene, Serkov attempted to pilot the plane to the parents' apartment where his wife and two-year-old son were visiting. The aircraft pierced the stairwell between the 3rd and 4th floors, and being fueled with 800 liters of gasoline, ignited a large fire inside the stairwell that ultimately spread to damage 30 total apartments. Firefighters were on scene in five minutes, taking 57 minutes to extinguish the blaze. A four-year-old and two six-year-old children were killed at the scene from burns. Another four-year-old child died eight days later as a result of burns. In total, 11 residents were injured as a result of fire burns. Serkov's ex-wife (and her parents) and his toddler son were not injured in the incident.
- On March 6, 2006, an Antonov An-2 was destroyed in Lubaimanga
- On 11 February 2009, an Antonov An-2 aircraft suffered a loss in engine power while climbing through an altitude of about 50–70 metres. The pilot had to carry out a forced landing in a wooded area because he could not reach the airport at Pskov. All three crew members and ten paratroopers on board survived.
- On 22 February, 2009, a Golden Rule Airlines Antonov An-2, carrying cargo and crew, was damaged beyond repair after it crashed in a field due to loss of engine power. There were no fatalities.
- On May 6, 2016, after an unsuccessful attempt to restart their engines and approaching San Bernardino, an Antonov An-2R en route from Cable Airport to San Bernardino made a forced landing in a residential area which left none injured. According to the subsequent investigation, the lower gascolator and the fine fuel filter were filled partially with water, which led to engine failure.
- On 27 July 2018, an Antonov An-2 crashed on take-off from an airstrip near Kamako, killing five of seven occupants.
- On January 2021, a North Korean Air Force Antonov An-2 airplane lost control and crashed, killing the pilot and four students from the Chaehyun Military Academy.
- On 14 November 2022, in the Everglades, an An-2, which had been seized by U.S. Customs and Border Protection was being transported to Fort Lauderdale Executive Airport and overturned during a forced landing caused by an engine failure. Both pilots survived.
- On October 25, 2024, an An-2 was landing at a local airstrip after an agricultural spraying flight when the plane hit a tuk tuk with 15 people on board. Of the occupants of the tuk tuk 4 died and 8 other were injured. The 3 crew members, composed of Ukrainian and Sudanese nationals, were uninjured. The aircraft sustained substantial damage to its right wing and propeller.
- On August 16, 2025, an Antonov An-2 operated by Air Kasaï crashed in a wooded area while on a ferry flight near Kisangani, Democratic Republic of the Congo, killing all seven occupants.
- On 21 June 2026 a privately operated Antonov An-2 crashed while landing at Luxembourg Findel Airport, after a wing clipped the runway, leading to the airport being closed for several hours with all flights diverted or cancelled.

== Specifications (An-2) ==

Data from Biplanes, Triplanes, and Seaplanes

General characteristics

- Crew: 1–2
- Capacity: 12 passengers / 2,140 kg (4,718 lb)
- Length: 12.4 m (40 ft 8 in)
- Upper wingspan: 18.2 m (59 ft 9 in)
- Lower wingspan: 14.2 m (46 ft 7 in)
- Height: 4.1 m (13 ft 5 in)
- Wing area: 71.52 m^{2} (769.8 sq ft)
- Airfoil: TsAGI R-11 (14%)
- Empty weight: 3,300 kg (7,275 lb)
- Gross weight: 5,440 kg (11,993 lb)
- Fuel capacity: 1,200 L (320 US gal; 260 imp gal)
- Powerplant: 1 × Shvetsov ASh-62IR 9-cylinder air-cooled supercharged radial piston engine, 750 kW (1,010 hp)
- Propellers: 4-bladed constant-speed propeller

Performance

- Maximum speed: 258 km/h (160 mph, 139 kn)
- Cruise speed: 190 km/h (120 mph, 100 kn)
- Stall speed: 50 km/h (31 mph, 27 kn) circa
- Range: 845 km (525 mi, 456 nmi)
- Service ceiling: 4,500 m (14,800 ft)
- Rate of climb: 3.5 m/s (690 ft/min)
- Power/mass: 0.136 kW/kg (0.083 hp/lb)
- Fuel consumption: 185–200 L/h (49–53 gal/h; 41–44 imp gal/h)

== See also ==
- List of most-produced aircraft

Related development

- Antonov An-3

Aircraft of comparable role, configuration, and era

- Scottish Aviation Pioneer
- Max Holste Broussard
- de Havilland Canada DHC-3 Otter
- Dornier Do 27
- Dornier Do 28
- Pilatus PC-6 Porter
- Aero Commander 500 family
- Cessna 402
- Cessna 208 Caravan
- GippsAero GA8 Airvan
- Piper PA-31 Navajo
- Tecnam P2012 Traveller
- Britten-Norman BN-2 Islander
