= UZGA LMS-901 Baikal =

Type of aircraft

LMS-901
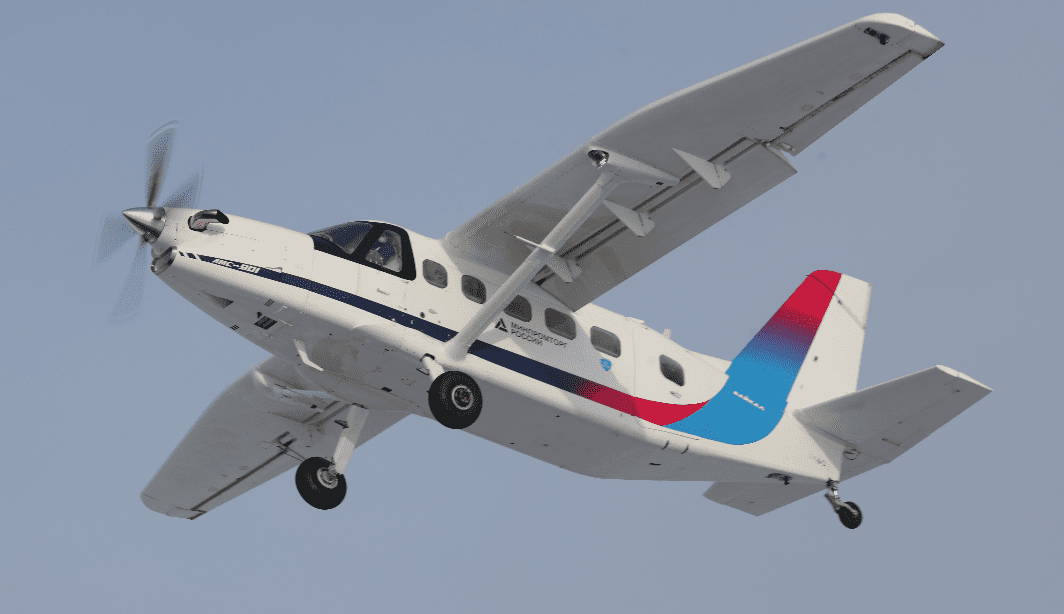
- LMS-901 Baikal on its first flight in January 2022

General information
- Type: Utility aircraft
- National origin: Russia
- Manufacturer: Ural Works of Civil Aviation (UZGA)
- Designer: Baikal Engineering
- Status: In development
- Number built: 3 (2026)

History
- Manufactured: 2021-present
- First flight: 30 January 2022

The UZGA LMS-901 Baikal is a utility aircraft produced by UZGA (Ural Works of Civil Aviation). The Russian Ministry of Industry and Trade selected UZGA in October 2019 to develop a replacement for the widespread Antonov An-2. The prototype made its maiden flight on 30 January 2022. The aluminum, single-turboprop airplane is powered by a GE H80 or a Klimov VK-800. It is planned to carry a 2 t (4,400 lb) payload or 9–12 passengers over 1,500 km (810 nmi) at 300 km/h (160 kn) from short unpaved airstrips.

== Development ==
In October 2019, UZGA (Ural Works of Civil Aviation) subsidiary Baikal Engineering won a tender to develop a light multi-purpose aircraft for the Russian Ministry of Industry and Trade. The first prototype was planned for the end of 2020, to begin testing in mid-2021; certification was planned for 2022 and mass production to start in 2023, while demand was expected for 230 planes.

The LMS-901 is designed to replace the Antonov An-2 after the SibNIA TVS-2DTS was indefinitely delayed. Wind tunnel testing was completed in late November 2020, as Russian regional airlines were interested in 200 aircraft.

By April 2021, an LMS-901 prototype airframe was completed. On 30 January 2022, the prototype made its first flight from Yekaterinburg Aramil Airport, up to 500 m (1,600 ft) and lasting 25 minutes. Serial production at Komsomolsk-on-Amur of 30 to 50 units per year was then planned for 2024.

By August 2022, it had been ordered by siberian operators KrasAir and Aeroservis, with seven to be delivered to the latter between 2025 and 2028, powered by a Klimov VK-800SM turboprop. In January 2023, Russian Aerokhimflot, an association of forestry and agricultural aviation operators set up in 2019, agreed to acquire 120 LMS-901s between 2026 and 2030.

In September of 2024, Vladimir Putin ordered the LMS-901 into serial production, although its intended Klimov VK-800SM engine is not expected to be certified until 2025, with deliveries of the engine not expected until 2026.

In early 2025, officials expressed a number of doubts with the aircraft, stating that additional funding was required. On 14 May, Russian Deputy Prime Minister Yury Trutnev stated that development of the aircraft had reached a dead end. This statement was rebuked by the Ministry of Industry and Trade, stating that a state contract had been signed in April for the integration of the VK-800 engine as well as resolving design defects. Certification testing of the AV-901 propeller began in September. By November, the Federal Air Transport Agency confirmed that the first flight of the aircraft equipped with the VK-800 is expected by the end of the year.

On 24 December 2025, the first flight of a LMS-901 equipped with a domestic Klimov VK-800 engine and Aerosila AV-901 propeller took place from Uktus Airport.

On 22 February 2026 the third prototype aircraft made its first flight. In addition to the installation of the VK-800SM engine and AV-901 propeller, the aircraft featured design improvements including a modified nose for better ergonomic and safety requirements, more robust landing gear, as well as a modified wing angle to negate premature liftoff during takeoff in high winds.

Serial production is planned to take place in both Yekaterinburg and Komsomolsk-on-Amur, with the expansion of construction facilities taking place to accommodate this.

== Design ==
The aluminum-made, high-wing monoplane is to be powered by the General Electric H80-200 and seat 9 passengers. Smaller and about two-thirds as heavy unloaded as the An-2, it should cost less than 120 million rubles ($1.6 million). The project cost is estimated at 4.5 billion rubles ($62.41 M) and the operating costs (excluding ownership) at 30,000 rubles ($416.06) per flying hour.

It should reach 300 km/h from a 95 km/h landing speed and cover 3,000 km. Optional electric motors could offer redundancy. It should fly a 800 nmi (1,500 km) range with a 2 t (4,400 lb) payload from short unpaved airstrips.

== Specifications ==
Data from Ural Works of Civil Aviation

General characteristics

- Capacity: 2,000 kg (4,400 lb) maximum payload, 9-12 passengers
- Length: 12.2 m (40 ft 0 in)
- Wingspan: 16.5 m (54 ft 2 in)
- Height: 3.7 m (12 ft 2 in)
- Empty weight: 1,980–2,040 kg (4,365–4,497 lb)
- Max takeoff weight: 4,800 kg (10,582 lb)
- Powerplant: 1 × General Electric H80-200 or Klimov VK-800SM turboprop
- Propellers: 4-bladed Hartzell, 2.6 m (8 ft 6 in) diameter

Performance

- Cruise speed: 300 km/h (190 mph, 160 kn)
- Minimum control speed: 95 km/h (59 mph, 51 kn)
- Range: 1,500 km (930 mi, 810 nmi) 2,000 kg payload, 45 minutes reserve
- Take-off and landing performance equal or better than the An-2

== See also ==
Aircraft of comparable role, configuration, and era

- Cessna 208 Caravan
- Daher Kodiak
- GippsAero GA10
- PAC P-750 XSTOL
- Pilatus PC-6 Porter
