= Klimov VK-800 =

1990s Russian turboshaft aircraft engine

VK-800
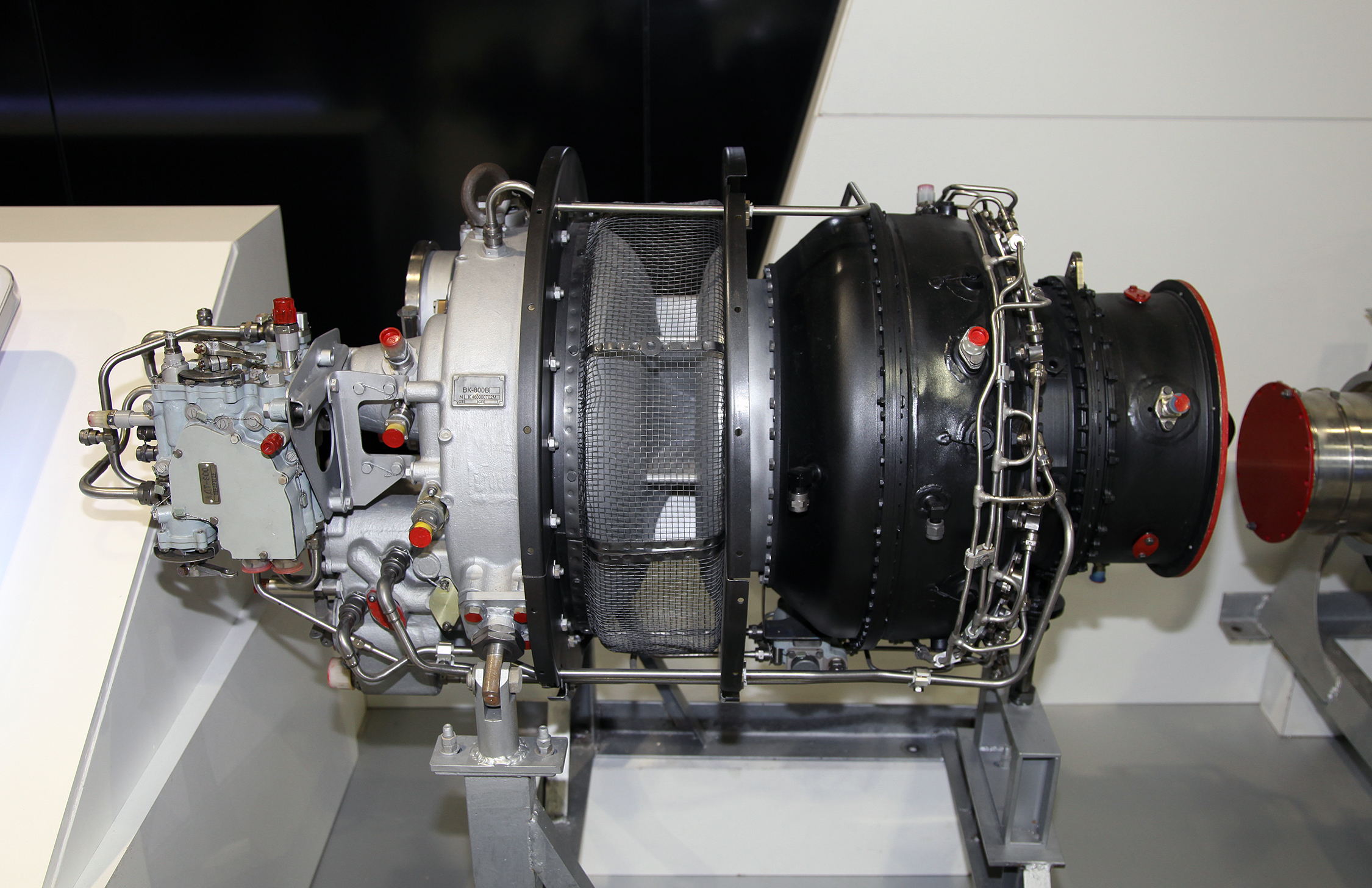
- Type: Turboshaft
- National origin: Russia
- Manufacturer: Klimov
- Major applications: Ansat; Ka-226; Mi-54; UZGA LMS-901 Baikal

The Klimov VK-800 is a turboshaft engine of the fifth generation. It is designed to equip the Mi-54, Ansat and Ka-226 "Sergei" type helicopters. The VK-800V derivative was developed for the power units of helicopters of small and large load-carrying capacity, both in twin- and single-engine configuration. The engine parameters meet the requirements of the tested model of a centrifugal compressor and the single-stage un-cooled turbines. All this simplifies the engine design and reduces expenses for its manufacture and operation. Moreover, the enhanced characteristics of the main units of the engine provide its high efficiency.

== History ==
This multipurpose engine core was disclosed at the Moscow 'Engines 98' exhibition. At that time test-bed running was said to be about to begin, but by 2004 development had been suspended, for lack of funds. Some literature gave the designation as VKS-800, the S highlighting participation by Motor Sich, which in 2000 described this engine as a joint effort. Despite a statement in 1998 that bench testing was "about to begin," a report dated 21 December 2001 stated that the two partners had "begun production of the first components". Flight tests of the VK-800V were then planned for late 2002, with certification scheduled for the end of 2003 but this schedule was not met. Klimov has spent the past several years simplifying the engine and, among other things, removing one of the original two centrifugal compressors. Whereas in 2000 the pressure ratio was given as 12, the OPR in 2005 had fallen to 8. By careful redesign of the compressor, and increase in rpm, the OPR has now been restored to 10. This is despite simplification of the turbine, with solid rotor blades. In 2004 Klimov described the programme as being "on hold".

In September of 2024, Vladimir Putin ordered the single-engine UZGA LMS-901 Baikal aircraft into serial production as the Antonov An-2’s intended replacement. The Klimov VK-800SM variant was selected as the sole available powerplant for the aircraft; however, certification of the engine was not expected until 2025, with engine deliveries not starting until 2026. The VK-800 has also been named as the powerplant for the twin-engine LMS-192 Osvey, although manufacture of that aircraft is not expected until 2027.

== Variants ==
- The VK-800S is a turboprop version of the VK-800 intended to be used on fixed-wing turboprop aircraft of about one tonne payload.
- The VK-800V is a turboshaft version dedicated to helicopters.

== Applications ==
VK-800S turboprop

- UZGA LMS-901 Baikal
- UZGA UTS-800

== Specifications VK-800V ==
==== General characteristics ====
- Type: Turboshaft
- Length: 1000 mm
- Diameter: 590 mm
- Dry weight: 140 kg

==== Components ====
- Compressor:

==== Performance ====
- Maximum power output: 600 kW (800 shp)
- Specific fuel consumption: 260 g/hp/h
