= Polyot =

Polyot is a transliteration of the Russian term Полёт (meaning Flight) and can be transliterated as Polyot, Poljot or Polet. Polyot can refer to the following:

- Polet Flight, a defunct Russian airline formerly based in Voronezh
- Poljot, a brand of watches from the USSR, and now Russia
- Polyot (rocket), an interim orbital carrier rocket from the USSR
- Federal State Unitary Enterprise "Production Corporation "Polyot", a company based in Omsk, responsible for manufacture of the Antonov An-3 aircraft and Cosmos-3M space launch vehicle, amongst others
- Polyot-Sirena, the major Russian Global Distribution System
- Polyot, Russian aerospace journal

== See also ==
- ru:Полёт (значения)
