= Siberian Aviation Research Institute =

Russian research institute

Chaplygin Siberian Scientific Research Institute Of Aviation
- Company type: Federal State Unitary Enterprise
- Founded: 1941
- Headquarters: Novosibirsk, Russia
- Website: sibnia.ru

Chaplygin Siberian Scientific Research Institute Of Aviation (SibNIA) (Russian: Сибирский научно-исследовательский институт авиации им. С. А. Чаплыгина) is a research institute based in Novosibirsk, Russia, and established in 1941.

SIBNIA is one of Russia's leading aviation research institutes, with departments devoted to aerodynamics, avionics testing, full-scale fatigue testing, thermal strength testing, fatigue and loading spectra, and dynamic strength testing.

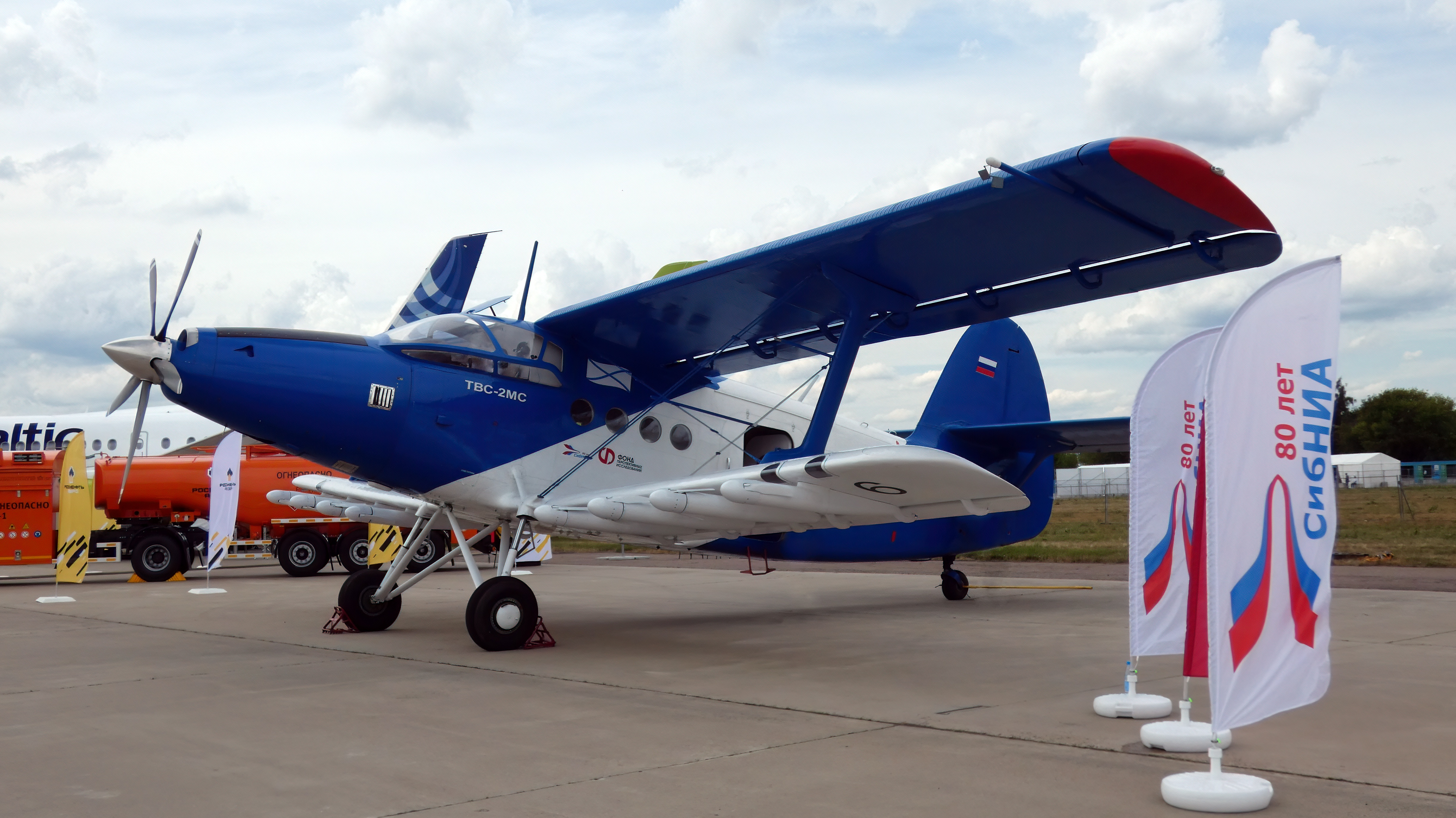
TVS-2MS with lifting force increasing equipment

Researchers at SIBNIA have published work on topics such as localization of the sources of acoustic emissions in strength testing of aviation materials, fatigue and fracture in steel and concrete structures, piezotransducer amplification, strengths of materials, and metallurgy. Since 1943, over 180 aircraft and 200 aircraft components have been tested at SIBNIA's facilities.

SIBNIA came into existence in 1941 when the Central Aerohydrodynamics Institute (TsAGI) was evacuated to Novosibirsk to escape from the German advance on Moscow. Sergey Chaplygin, the second director of TsAGI, died in Novosibirsk on 8 October 1942 and was buried in front of SIBNIA's main administration building. The bulk of TsAGI's personnel returned to Moscow in 1943, leaving behind a cadre of researchers and equipment at what then became the S.A. Chaplygin Siberian Scientific Research Institute of Aviation.
