= Mil Mi-54 =

Projected utility helicopter

Mi-54
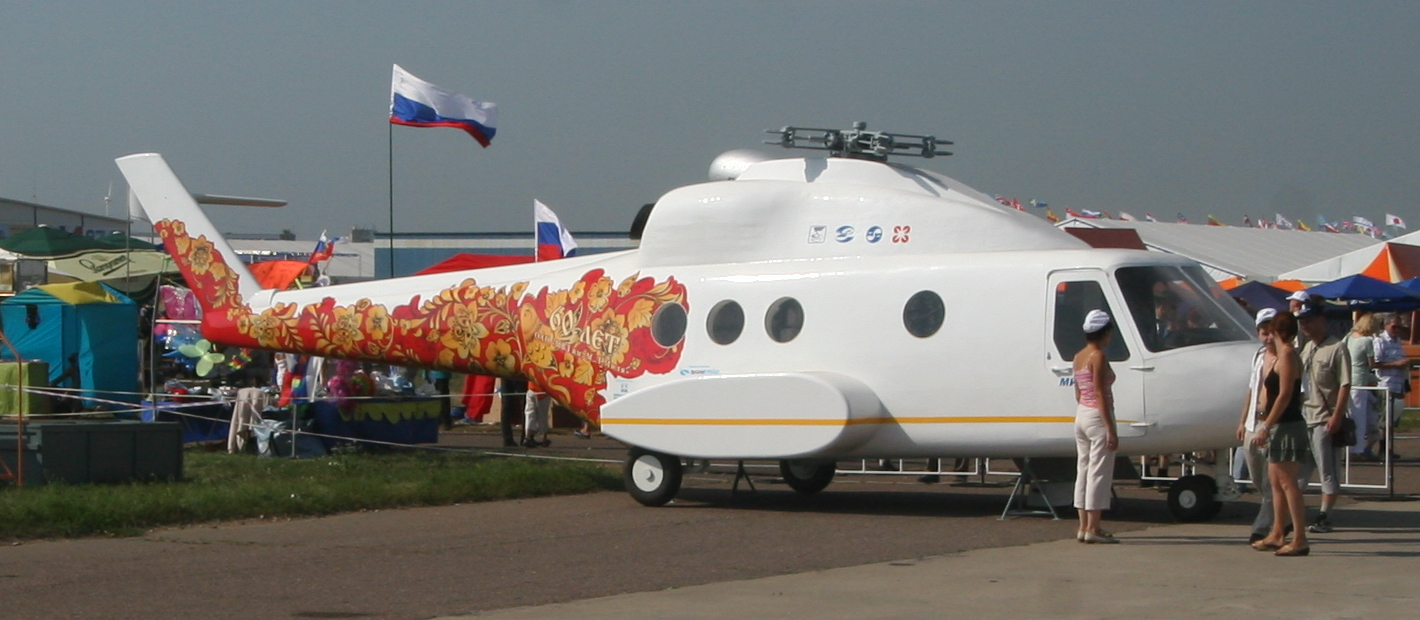
- Mil Mi-54 mock up at MAKS 2007 Airshow

General information
- Type: Civil Utility helicopter
- National origin: Russia
- Manufacturer: Mil

The Mil Mi-54 was a projected twin-turbine civil utility helicopter, first announced in 1992, intended to replace the Mi-2 and the Mi-8 helicopters. It was planned to use two 574 kW Saturn/Lyulka AL-32 turboshaft engines, four-bladed main and tail rotors, and fixed tricycle-type landing gear with one nosewheel and two rear wheels on sponsons.

== Specifications ==
Data from

General characteristics

- Crew: 2
- Capacity: 10-12 passengers
- Length: 13.113 m (43 ft 0 in)
- Height: 4.8 m (15 ft 9 in)
- Empty weight: 3,000 kg (6,614 lb)
- Max takeoff weight: 4,700 kg (10,362 lb) with external cargo on the sling, 4,500 kg (9920,802 lb) with internal cargo
- Powerplant: 2 × Saturn/Lyulka AL-32 turboshaft engines, 575 kW (771 shp) each
- Main rotor diameter: 13.5 m (44 ft 3 in)
- Main rotor area: 143.16 m^{2} (1,541.0 sq ft)

Performance

- Maximum speed: 280 km/h (170 mph, 150 kn)
- Cruise speed: 260 km/h (160 mph, 140 kn)
- Range: 600 km (370 mi, 320 nmi)
- Service ceiling: 5,500 m (18,000 ft)
