= Golden Rule Airlines =

Kyrgyz airline (2003–2011)

IATA	ICAO	Call sign
--	GRS	GOLDEN RULE
- Founded: 2003
- Ceased operations: 2011
- Fleet size: 3
- Destinations: Central Asia
- Headquarters: Bishkek, Kyrgyzstan
- Key people: Golydbin, Valeri

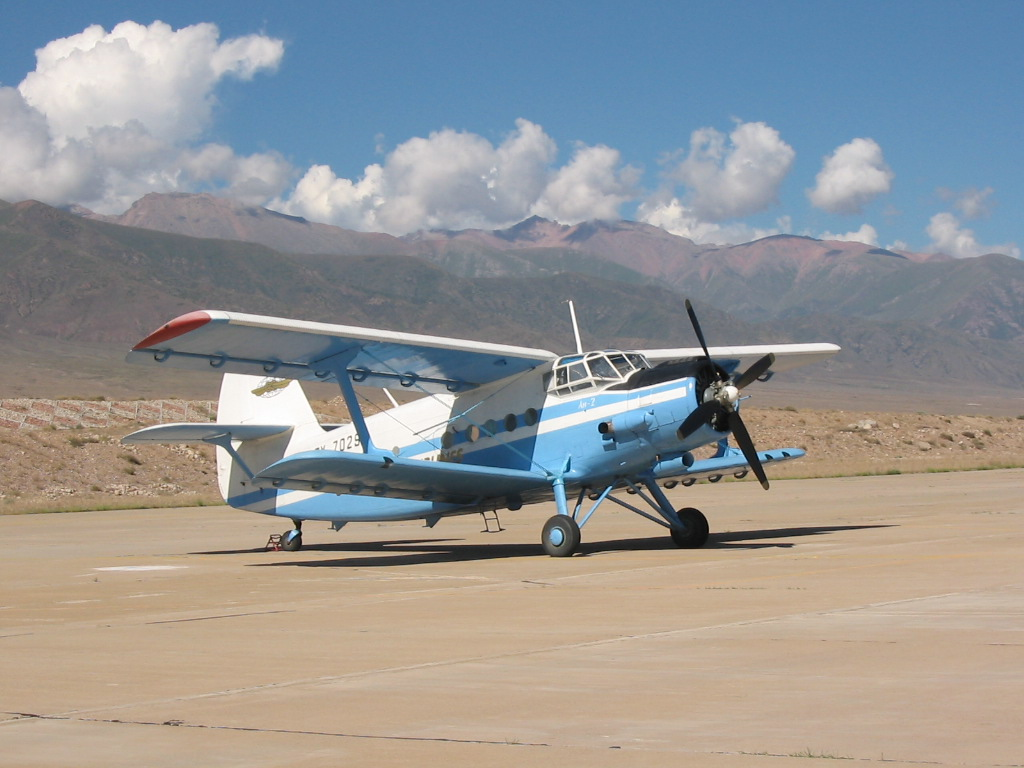
Golden Rule Airline's An-2 at Lake Issyk Kul on 18 August 2005

Golden Rule Airlines was a charter airline based in Bishkek, Kyrgyzstan. It ceased operations in 2011.

== History ==
The airline was established in 2003.

On October 12, 2006, the airline was added to the list of air carriers banned in the European Union.

On February 22, 2009, one of its aircraft, carrying cargo and crew, was damaged beyond repair after it crashed in a field due to loss of engine power. There were no fatalities.

== Fleet ==
The fleet consisted of 3 Antonov An-2 biplanes.
