= Antonov An-3 =

1990s utility transport aircraft by Antonov

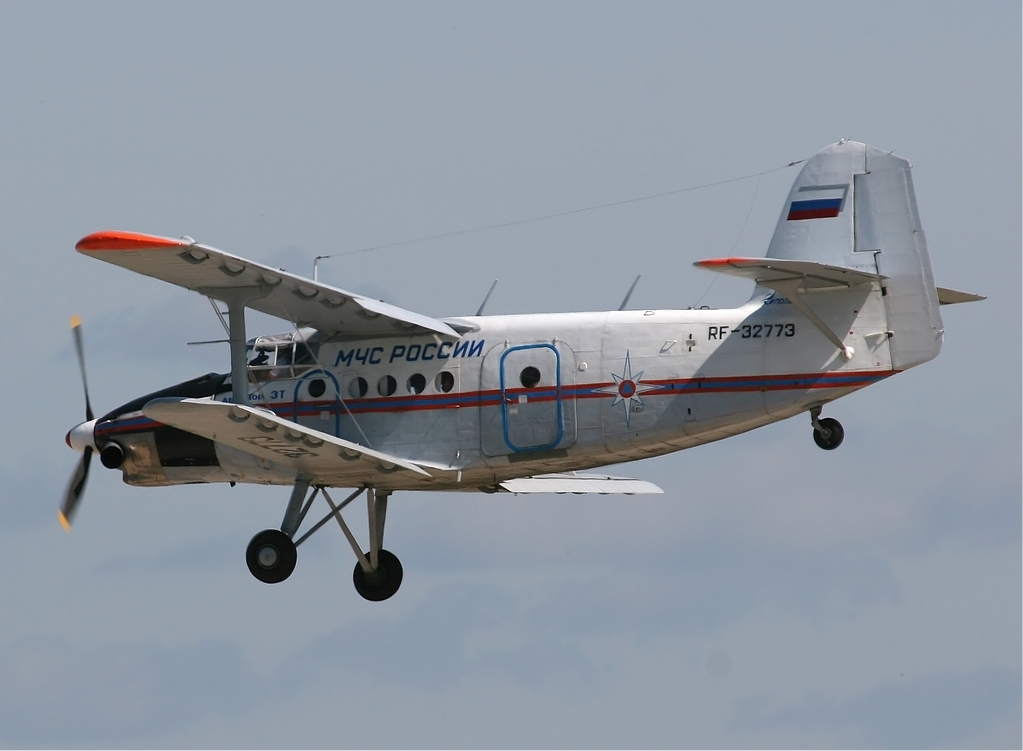
- Antonov An-3T of MChS Rossii in June 2007.

General information
- Type: Utility aircraft
- Manufacturer: Antonov
- Built by: Production Corporation Polyot (2000–2009)
- Status: In service
- Primary user: regional and private operators
- Number built: 28

History
- Manufactured: 2000–2009 (in Russia); 2012-present (in Ukraine)
- Introduction date: 21 November 2000
- First flight: 13 May 1980
- Developed from: Antonov An-2
- Developed into: SibNIA TVS-2DTS

The Antonov An-3 is a Soviet (later Ukrainian and Russian) civil multipurpose and agricultural aircraft. It is essentially a turboprop-powered development of the An-2, designed to upgrade or replace it. The basic transport version (An-3T) is supplemented by a cargo/passenger version (An-3TK), an agricultural version (An-3SH), a forest fire-fighting version (An-3P), as well as an ambulance version. It is designed to carry passengers and cargo, operating from paved or unpaved airfields, including snow covered surfaces up to 35 cm (14 in) deep (using a ski landing gear).

== Upgrading ==
The upgrading consisted of replacement of the piston engine with a 1,025 kW (1,375 shp) TVD-20 turboprop engine, featuring a three-blade reversible pitch (type AV-17) propeller and a R-17 speed governor. The flight compartment was rearranged; a heating and ventilation system was installed as well as advanced electric and flight and navigation equipment; centralized warning system; a new fire extinguishing system; and an improvement of the external wide-spreading dispensing equipment for agricultural needs. The upgrades allowed the aircraft to be more reliable and to increase the cargo lifting capacity of the aircraft by 20%, as well as ensuring more comfortable conditions for the crew, including the lowering of the noise and vibration inside the cockpit. The rate of climb was increased by 1.9 times, and the take-off and landing performance of the aircraft was increased. The upgrading allowed the use of kerosene and lubricants commonly used for other aircraft instead of gasoline. The take-off weight and payload was also increased and the upgrade allowed the landing performance to use ground strips 500 metres (1,600 ft) long. The upgrading was arranged at both the "Polyot" Production Association in Omsk, Russian Federation, and at Antonov ASTC, Kyiv, Ukraine.

The first example flew as early as May 13, 1980, but because of a lack of official interest in the project, work proceeded very slowly. Flight testing was not complete until 1991. It is one of the few turbine-powered biplane designs to date. The An-3T received its Type Certificate on 31 August 2000. Supplements to the Type Certificate included version with ski landing gear and an agricultural version.

== Variants ==
The project was revitalised in the late 1990s when it was taken over by Polyot State Aerospace Enterprise, and a marketing campaign began in earnest in 2000, although sales have been limited. It is available in four forms, the basic transport version (An-3T), the convertible cargo/passenger able to carry 12 passengers or 1,800 kg (4,000 lb) of cargo (An-3TK)k the agricultural aircraft (An-3SH—"Selsko-Khosiajstwenni") and the fire-fighting version (An-3P).

Another attempt to replace the An-2 on Soviet farms was made in the 1970s with the WSK-Mielec M-15 Belphegor, but it failed.

From 2007, the "Polyot" Production Association aimed to start a series of modernization upgrades to ten An-2s of the Russian Airborne Troops to An-3T-10 standard. The overall requirement was estimated at 200 aircraft. However, none of these An-3T-10s were ever delivered and the Russian Airborne Troops continue to use unmodified An-2s.

== Specifications (An-3T) ==
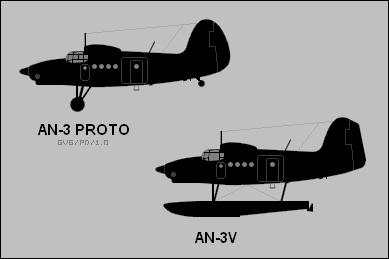
Antonov An-3 side elevation drawings

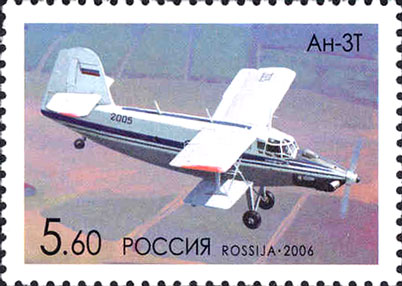
Antonov An-3T

Data from Antonov An-2

General characteristics

- Crew: two
- Capacity: Useful load 1,800 kg (4,000 lb)
- Length: 14 m (45 ft 11 in)
- Wingspan: 18.176 m (59 ft 8 in)
- Height: 4.235 m (13 ft 11 in)
- Wing area: 71.51 m^{2} (769.7 sq ft)
- Max takeoff weight: 5,800 kg (12,787 lb)
- Powerplant: 1 × Glushenkov TVD-20-03 Turboprop, 1,010 kW (1,350 hp)

Performance

- Maximum speed: 260 km/h (160 mph, 140 kn)
- Cruise speed: 220 km/h (140 mph, 120 kn) at 2,000 m (6,600 ft)
- Range: 550 km (340 mi, 300 nmi) with a 1,500 kg (3,300 lb) payload
- Service ceiling: 4,400 m (14,400 ft)
- Rate of climb: 5 m/s (980 ft/min)
- Wing loading: 81 kg/m^{2} (17 lb/sq ft)
- Power/mass: 0.174 kW/kg

== Accidents and incidents ==
- On 13 October 2024 an Antonov An-3T operated by Borus Aircompany crashed near Olyokminsk Airport, Sakha Republic, Russia, killing one of the 5 people on board.

== See also ==
Related development

- Antonov An-2
- Antonov An-4
- Antonov An-6

Aircraft of comparable role, configuration, and era

- PAC Cresco
