= NPO Saturn AL-32 =

Turbofan engine

The NPO Saturn AL-32M is a 92/95 kN turbofan engine based on the Lyulka/Saturn AL-31F and Saturn AL-41F-1 jet engines. It is proposed to be used on the Tupolev Tu-444 supersonic business jet.

== See also ==
- NPO Saturn
- Tu-444
