= Omsk Engine Design Bureau =

Aircraft engine design and manufacturing company

- Company type: Joint-stock company
- Industry: Space
- Founded: 15 October 1956; 68 years ago
- Headquarters: Omsk, Russia
- Parent: NPO Saturn
- Website: www.omkb.ru

The Omsk Engine Design Bureau (along OMO named after Baranov) is an aero engine design bureau. It was originally situated in Moscow in the Soviet Union, but was evacuated in 1941. Operations were moved to a "site of farm machinery" . The Bureau returned to Moscow and became independent on 5 July 1947 and was renamed "OKB-20" . The bureau absorbed OKB-29 in 1963 and in 1966 was renamed Mashinostoitel'noe KB (MKB). Since 1994, it has been known as Omskoe mashinstroitel'noe KB (or OMKB) .

Although it has had many chief designers and directors, many of the engines from this bureau are known by the name Glushenkov, named for V.A. Glushenkov, a designer from 1963.

In soviet times, some engineers from OMKB and OMO Baranov Polyot left to Zaporozhe Ivchenko Progress (Motor Sich) to manufacture helicopter engine turboshafts, turboprops, turbojets, turbofans and gas turbines. Due to forced soviet decentralization and partly due to medal achievements, engine dimensions and related rewarding, larger aircraft engines where endorsed (rather than smaller turbojets, turbofans, turboprops or helicopter turboshafts).

== Products ==
- Turboshafts, Turbojets, Turboprops, Turbofans, Gas Turbines
- 36MT (TRDD-50), R95, 37- turbofan for missiles and UAV UCAV use .

ob 37-04 (TRDD-50B) Kh-59 MK2

- TVD-10, TVD-20
- AL-21F-3T
- VK-2500
- TV7-117ST, TV3-117VMA-SBM1
- TV1, TV2, TV3-117, AI- Lot D-
- GTD-20 20S(AL-21F-3)

(capable of building SaM-146 PS90A D30 PD14 D436 AI222(25) RD-33MK engines, TV7-117 class)

APU
various APU (such as GTD-5, GTD-5M), reducers, gears
