= SibNIA TVS-2DTS =

Russian single-engine civilian aircraft

SibNIA TVS-2 series
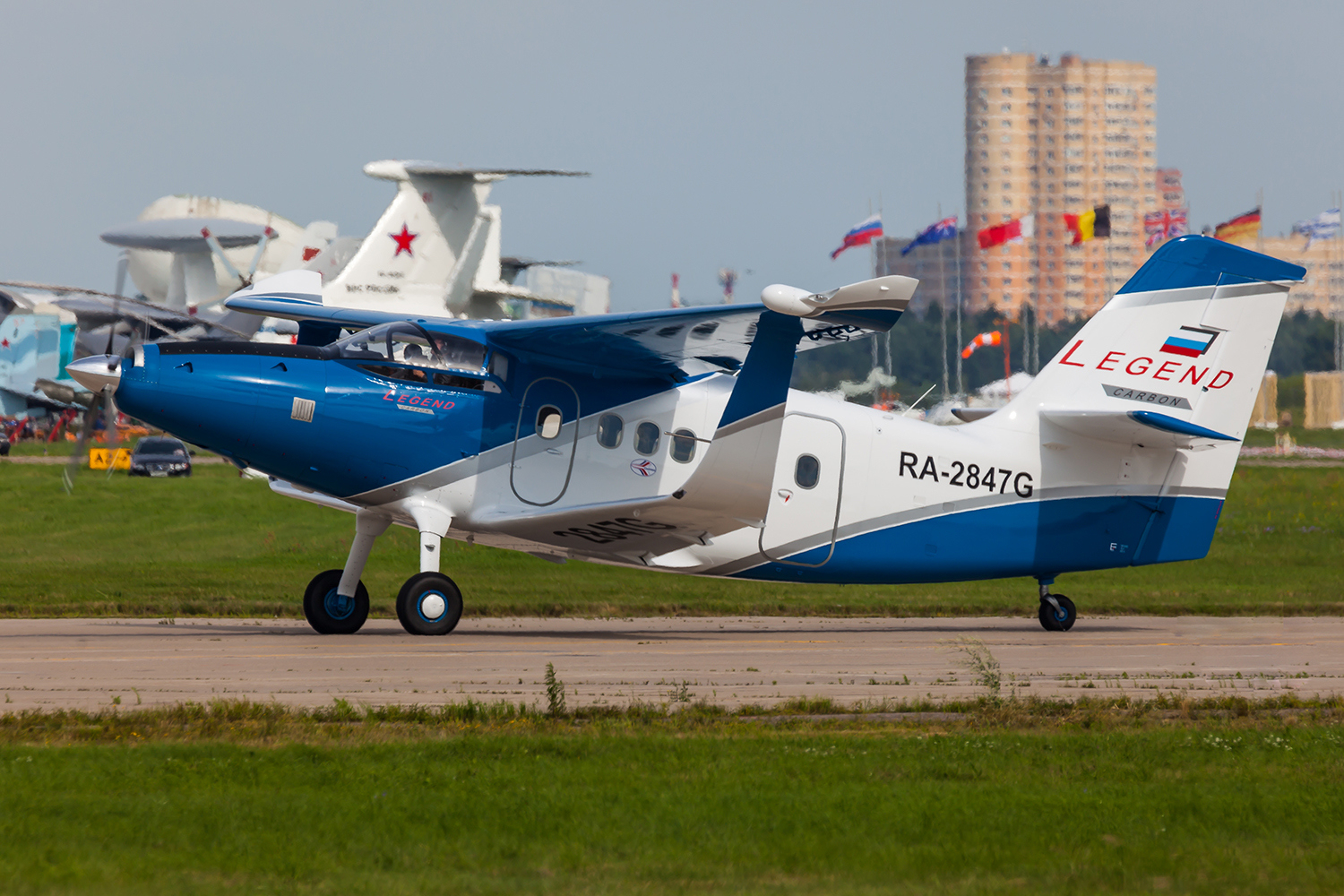
- SibNIA TVS-2DTS

General information
- Type: Agricultural, utility aircraft and military transport aircraft
- National origin: Russia
- Manufacturer: SibNIA

History
- First flight: September 5 2011
- Developed from: Antonov An-2; Antonov An-3

The SibNIA TVS-2DTS (Russian: СибНИА ТВС-2ДТС) is a single-engined biplane utility aircraft developed by the Siberian Aeronautics Research Institute (Russian: Сибирский научно-исследовательский институт авиации) as a light multi-role successor to the An-2. The TVS-2DTS was eventually not selected as the An-2's replacement, and the replacement program was reopened. The abbreviation TVS stands for turbovintovoy samolyot, or "turboprop aircraft" (Russian: турбовинтовой самолёт). It is one of the few modern biplane aircraft designs.

== Development ==
The TVS-2DTS is a comprehensively modernized derivative of the twelve-seat An-2 biplane. The aircraft made its first flight on July 10, 2018, in Novosibirsk. It was planned to build five test aircraft to achieve certification in 2020.

In September 2019, it was announced that the SibNIA TVS-2DTS would not become the replacement of the An-2 aircraft type; the Russian Ministry of Industry and Trade asked the government procurement portal for research and development of a completely new airframe to replace it, instead of an extensively modified version. The TVS-2DTS had a large amount of Western-built parts, and the Russian Government wanted the replacement to be made of entirely Russian parts.

In October 2019, UZGA (Ural Works of Civil Aviation) won the contest for the development of a replacement for the An-2 with their UZGA LMS-901 Baikal aircraft.

== Design ==
Unlike the aluminium biplane that preceded it, the TVS-2DTS is constructed of composites, has a turboprop engine and glass cockpit. It is based on the TVS-2MS, which has been in production since 2011. Unlike its predecessor, the fuselage and wings of the TVS-2DTS are made entirely of composite materials reinforced with carbon fibre. The lower wings have winglets that reach up to and are connected to the upper wings (closed wing). The STOL capabilities make the aircraft particularly suitable for military and civilian supply flights in areas with poor infrastructure. Other possible uses are firefighting or medical rescue flights.

== Orders and deliveries ==
In July 2017, there were 50 orders. The TVS-2DTS is to be built in the Novosibirsk region, initially at a production rate of 20 units per year. As of February 2025, there are 11 different known operators. They are:

- Aeroservice - 1
- Avialesookhrana - 2
- Aviation of Kolyma - 1
- Belarus Air Force - 1
- Naryan-Mar Air Enterprise - 1
- Rusaviaprom - 3
- Russian Air Force - 1
- SibAeroCraft - 1
- SibNIA - 11
- Stavropol Air Company - 1
- TechnoRegion - 3
- 10 aircraft are operated by unknown owners.

== Specifications ==
Data from 21st century biplane

General characteristics

- Crew: 1–2
- Capacity: 12 passengers / 3,500 kg (7,716 lb)
- Length: 14.7 m (48 ft 3 in)
- Upper wingspan: 19.8 m (65 ft 0 in)
- Empty weight: 3,900 kg (8,598 lb)
- Max takeoff weight: 7,000 kg (15,432 lb)
- Powerplant: 1 × Honeywell TPE331-12UAN Turboprop, 820 kW (1,100 hp)
- Propellers: 4-bladed Hartzell-HC-5BMP constant-speed propeller

Performance

- Maximum speed: 340 km/h (210 mph, 180 kn)
- Cruise speed: 290–300 km/h (180–190 mph, 160–160 kn)
- Range: 3,000 km (1,900 mi, 1,600 nmi) with full payload
- Endurance: 25 hours
- Service ceiling: 4,400 m (14,400 ft)

== See also ==
- Closed wing
- UZGA LMS-901 Baikal
- Antonov An-2
- Antonov An-3
