= Taman, Perm Krai =

Taman Таман
- Selo
- Location within Perm Krai Location within Russia
- Coordinates: 59°18′N 56°20′E
- Country: Russia
- Region: Perm Krai
- District: Usolsky District
- Time zone: UTC+5:00

Taman (Russian: Таман) is a rural locality (a selo) in Usolsky District, Perm Krai, Russia. The population was 82 as of 2010. There are 7 streets.

== Geography ==
Taman is located 74 km southwest of Usolye (the district's administrative centre) by road. Bystraya is the nearest rural locality.
