= Flamingo Aerospace =

Indian aerospace services company

- Company type: Private
- Industry: Aerospace Engineering, Aviation
- Founded: 28 April 2022; 3 years ago in Hyderabad, India
- Founder: Pappula Subhakar
- Key people: Pappula Subhakar (CEO)
- Website: flamingoaerospace.com

Flamingo Aerospace is an Indian aerospace services company based in Hyderabad, Telangana.

The company was founded by entrepreneur Pappula Subhakar in 2022, with the goal of establishing India as a leader in "affordable, sustainable, and innovative" aviation.

== History ==
In late December 2025, during a visit by Russian President Vladimir Putin to India, a number of agreements were made in the field of joint production in the aerospace sector. In late January 2026, a Russian domestically produced Ilyushin Il-114 aircraft of the United Aircraft Corporation made the journey from Zhukovsky to Hyderabad via Makhachkala and Ras Al Khaimah, covering a distance of approximately 7,600 km. The aircraft made the journey to take part in the Wings India airshow, where the signing of a partnership between UAC and Flamingo Aerospace was expected. Imagery of the aircraft was published by UAC showing the logo of both companies.

On 28 January 2026, a preliminary agreement between Flamingo Aerospace and United Aircraft Corporation was signed. The first stage of cooperation involves the delivery of six Ilyushin Il-114-300 produced in Russia to be delivered by 2028. Following this, UAC has stated that it would assist the Indian company in gradually increasing its competencies in the assembly, maintenance and repair of aircraft. The company would begin with the development of MRO facilities and production of interior fittings, followed by further assembly and localisation from 2030 onwards. Flamingo is not expected to be the end user of the aircraft, instead the aircraft will be used to grow capabilities, with the option to offer the aircraft under leasing arrangements with domestic carriers. The aircraft is internally designated as the Flamingo Aerospace FA-68.

== Leadership ==
- Pappula Subhakar - Founder and CEO
- Sailesh Sigatapu - Director, Head of Investments and Growth
- Pappula Srikar - Director, Head of Operations

== Fleet ==
Aircraft	In service	Orders	Notes
Ilyushin Il-114	0	6	To be delivered by 2028.
Total	0	6	

== See also ==
- United Aircraft Corporation
- India–Russia relations
