= Scally Milano =

Russian rapper (born 2002)

- Born: Daniil Vladislavovich Dmitriev; Дании́л Владисла́вович Дми́триев; March 25, 2002 (age 24); Berezniki, Russia
- Genres: Rap; Trap
- Years active: 2019-present

Scally Milano (real name Daniil Vladislavovich Dmitriev; Russian: Дании́л Владисла́вович Дми́триев, born 25 March 2002, Berezniki, Perm Oblast) is a Russian rapper.

== Biography ==
Daniil Vladislavovich Dmitriev was born on 25 March 2002 in Berezniki, Perm Oblast. In 2019, he adopted the pseudonym Scally Milano and began releasing rap tracks.

== Discography ==
=== Full-length albums ===
- scally_milano_hexd_mix.mp3 (2020)
- "ХАМЕЛЕОН (CHAMELEON)" (2020)
- "Хамелеон" (2020)
- Russian Scam (2020)
- 159 (2020)
- Money Counter Music (2021)
- "Пропаганда денег" (2022)
- Really Rich (2022)
- "Проблемный ребёнок" (2023)
- "Искусство" (2024, with Uglystephan)

=== EPs ===
- Onion (2021)
