= Berezniki Airport =

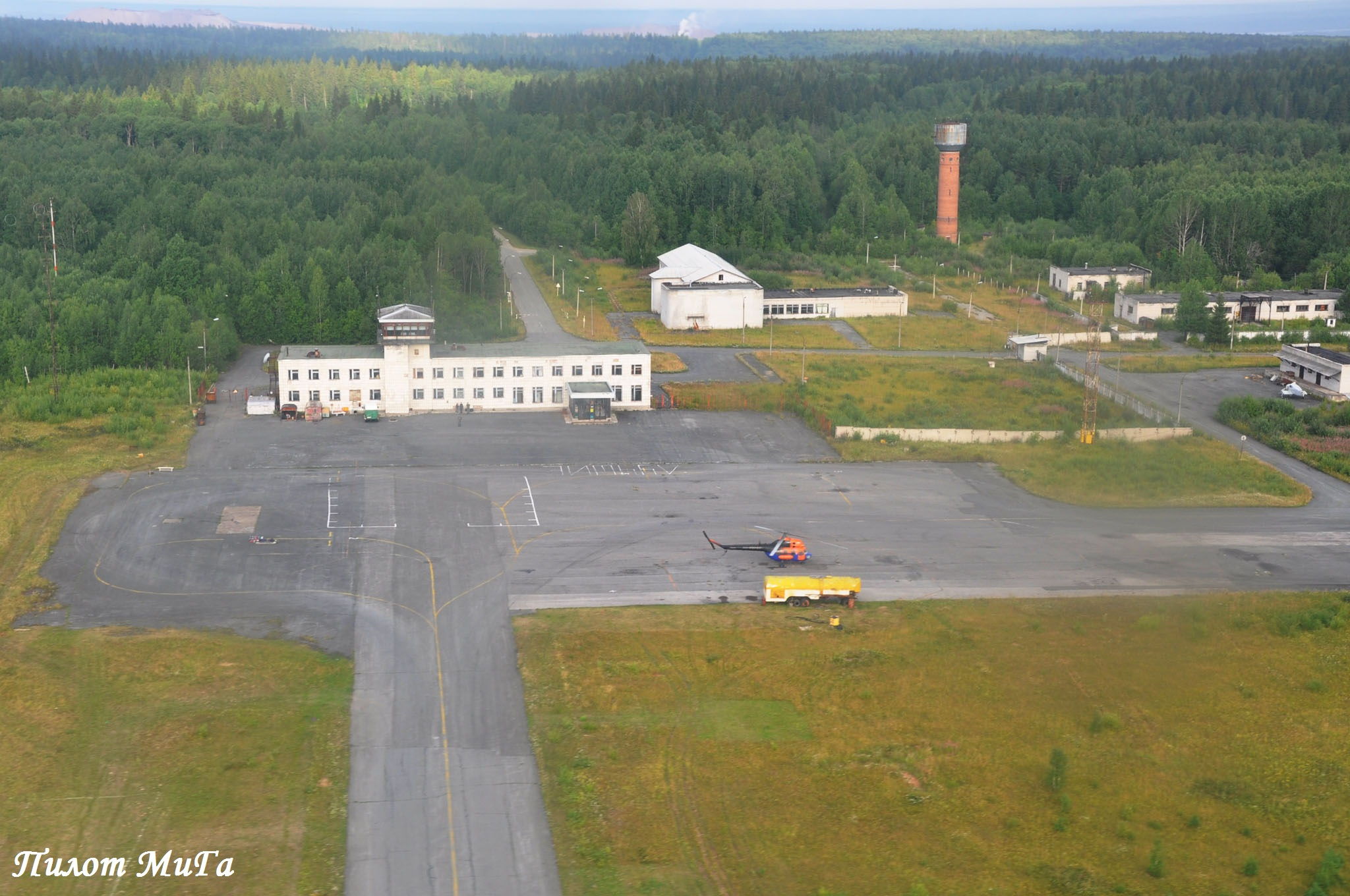
- IATA: none; ICAO: USPT

Summary
- Airport type: Public
- Operator: Perm Airlines
- Location: 679
- Elevation AMSL: 207 ft / 63 m
- Coordinates: 59°34′0″N 56°51′48″E
- Interactive map of Berezniki Airport

Runways
Direction	Length		Surface
Direction	ft	m	Surface
17/35	4,921	1,500	Asphalt

Berezniki Airport (Russian: Аэропорт Березники) (ICAO: USPT) is an airport in Russia located 9 km southeast of Solikamsk. It mostly services helicopters.

== History ==
The airport was built in 1983. The airport was approved to receive such types of aircraft as AN-2, AN-24, AN-26, Yak-40, IL-18, IL-114. Until 1992, it was a structural subdivision of the 2nd squadron based at the Bakharevka airport in Perm. In 1992, after the squadron was closed, it was transferred to the city of Berezniki, becoming Russia's first airport-municipal enterprise. Between 1993 and 2001 it operated regular flights to Moscow, St Petersburg, Samara and Anapa as well as local flights within the Perm Region. In the autumn of 2001, the scheduled flights were suspended due to non-profitability and the operator's certificate was withdrawn. At the moment, the airport does not operate regular flights and is only used by helicopters for intermediate stops and refuelling, as well as by forest protection aviation and light private aircraft. There are also occasional car races held at the airfield.

== See also ==
- List of airports in Russia
