= Vyborg (airline) =

Airline based in St. Petersburg, Russia

Vyborg Выборг
IATA	ICAO	Call sign
-	VBG	-
- Founded: 2002
- Ceased operations: 2010
- Operating bases: Pulkovo Airport
- Fleet size: 2
- Headquarters: Saint Petersburg, Russia
- Website: aviavyborg.ru

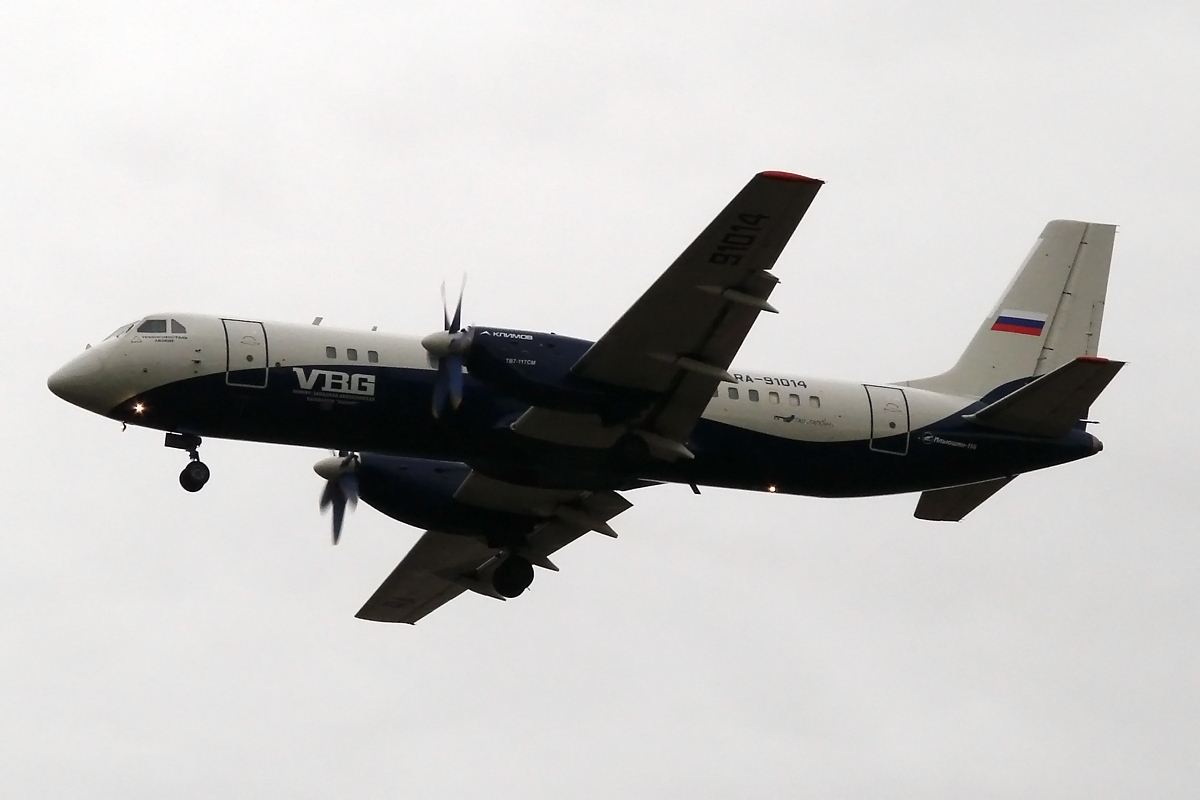
Vyborg Ilyushin Il-114

North West Aviation Transport Company Vyborg (Russian: Северо-Западная Авиационная Транспортная Компания «Выборг») was an airline based in Saint Petersburg, Russia, operating chartered passenger flights out of Pulkovo Airport. The company was founded in 2002 and operated a fleet of two Ilyushin Il-114 aircraft, a type of which only 20 have been built. In July 2010, Vyborg was shut down.

== Solaris Airlines ==
Vyborg's airline licence was passed onto Solaris Airlines.

Solaris was owned by Coral Travel and planned to operate as an international charter airline from Vnukovo Airport, but the plan failed to materialize, and the venture ceased operation in 2011.

== Fleet ==
- Ilyushin Il-114 - 2
- Airbus A321 - 2 planes transferred from Solaris to Ural Airlines in 2012
