= Tashkent Mechanical Plant =

High-technology company in Uzbekistan

Joint-Stock Company Tashkent Mechanical Plant
- Native name: Uzbek: Toshkent Mexanika Zavodi Aksiyadorlik Jamiyati
- Formerly: JSC national company Tashkent Aviation Production Association after V. P. Chkalov
- Type: Open joint-stock company
- Founded: 1932; 94 years ago
- Fate: Taken over in 2015
- Headquarters: Tashkent, Uzbekistan
- Area served: Asia
- Key people: Isokov Zafar Zinnatulloevich (Chairman and CEO)
- Owner: Uzbekistan Railways
- Website: www.tmz.uz

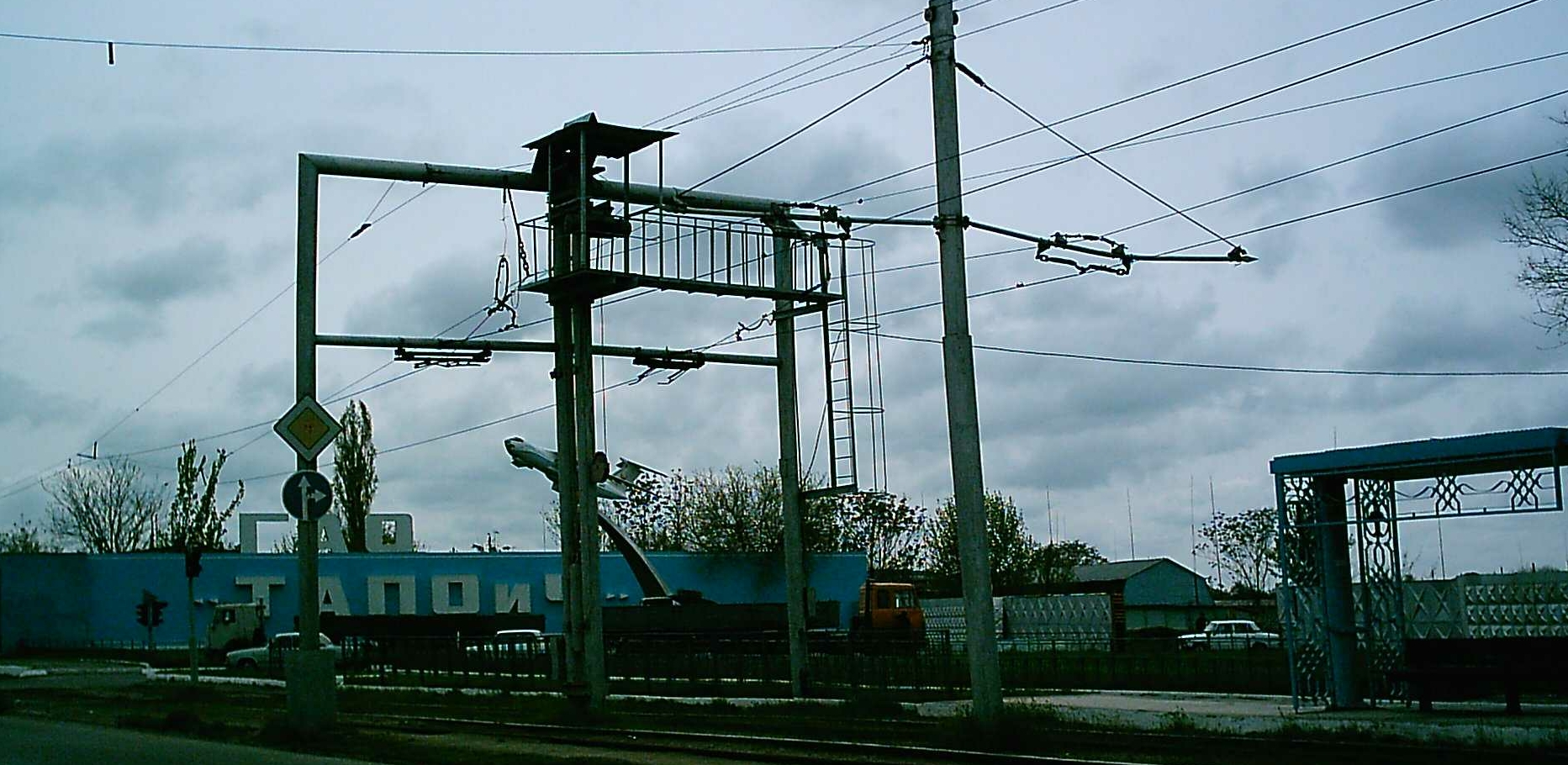
The entrance of Tashkent Aviation Production Association

Tashkent Mechanical Plant (TMZ) (Uzbek: Toshkent Mexanika Zavodi), formerly Tashkent Aviation Production Association named after V. P. Chkalov (TAPO or TAPOiCh) (Uzbek: V.P.Chkalov nomli Toshkent aviatsiya ishlab chiqarish birlashmasi) is a leading high-technology company of Uzbekistan, which was originally moved from Russia to the rear of the Soviet Union, Uzbekistan in 1941 during World War II.

The enterprise declared bankruptcy in September 2010 and was planning to end all aircraft production in 2012 with the external management procedure, which was terminated in November 2013 after settling with its creditors in October.

However, due to Russian interest, the plant considered resuming production and focus on the production of Ilyushin Il-114 passenger and cargo aircraft, as well as keep its major specialization: assembly, overhaul and repair of aircraft. These plans, though, contradicted the Uzbek government's desire to close aircraft-related activities and focus on its current production of structural units, household products, spare parts for cars and agricultural equipment.

The plant renamed as "Tashkent Mechanical Plant" on 1 January 2014 and resumed operation as legal entity on 24 January 2014. Then the company exited aircraft production in 2015, but retaining aircraft parts, components production and aviation MRO services.

Based on the presidential decree from the then Uzbekistan President Islam Karimov on 30 April 2015, Uzbekistan Railways took control of Tashkent Mechanical Plant on 1 May 2015.

== Origins ==
During the first and the second five-year plans, the Soviet government tried to supply the aviation sector with the national production.

In the first plan was created the ANT aircraft family. The planes played a great role in the civil aircraft sector but the progress in the following decades has rendered these planes obsolete and they have been modernized or replaced.

In the second plan, it was founded in 1932 in the city of Khimki, Moscow region as the 84 Repairing Factory of GVF (Civil Aviation Fleet). It was later renamed the Aviation Factory, after V. P. Chkalov. Valeriy Chkalov was the most experienced of all Soviet test pilots and lost his life on 15 December 1938, while testing the new Polikarpov I-180 prototype.

== Overview ==
TAPOiCh was a multifunctional company. This association was responsible for aircraft production, for the social development of the city where it is situated and for the health-care system for its employees. During its long existence, the company has been involved in the production of a wide range of aircraft including: I-15, I-16, I-153, Li-2, Il-14, An-8, An-12, An-22, and Ka-22, as well as the wing and centre section of the An-124 and An-225. In addition, the company has produced the following variants of the Il-76: Il-76K, ‘Scalpel’, Scip, Il-78 and A-50.

=== First steps ===
The Tashkent Aviation Production Organisation was established in 1932 at Khimki in the Moscow region. In 1935, the factory received an order to update a civil plane ANT-9, in a propaganda airplane, "Krokodil".

In 1936, the preparations was begun for a licensed production of the Douglas DC-3. In 1939, the airplane was modified for local use, its production started and it was renamed as the PS-84.

In 1937, there were built some prototypes of the V. Levkov's hovercraft, named L-5.

In 1939, V. F. Bolkhovitinov controlled the construction of a new light bomber Su-2.

=== World War II ===
The factory and its entire staff were transported in December of the 1941 by a train convoy to its present site in Uzbekistan. In January 1942 production started.

This period was focused on the production of the Li-2, a licensed airplane variant of the Douglas DC-3. This plane became a symbol for the factory and the employees. It was put on a pedestal next to the main entrance.

=== Era of the biggest air transporters ===
When World War II was nearing the end, but a new conflict, the Cold War, was beginning. This arms race brought new goals to the factory N° 84.

- In 1954, the first transport aircraft, Il-14s were manufactured at the factory.
- In 1957, the first An-8 was built.
- In 1960, the factory took part in the development of the Ka-22 rotorcraft.
- In 1962, the first An-12 was built.
- In 1966, the factory was able to get over technical difficulties and build the first example of the An-22, named “Antaeus” (Ukrainian: Антей, Antei).
- In 1972, basing on the existing factory in Tashkent and new firms in Andijan and Fergana was formed the Tashkent Aviation Production Association.
- In 1973, the first Il-76 was manufactured. 950 examples of this multipurpose transporter were built in this factory.

This plant also manufactured the wings of the An-124, AN-225 and An-70 aircraft. The government-controlled Chkalov Tashkent Aircraft Production Company, headquartered outside of Tashkent, maintains one of the largest and most significant aircraft assembly plants in Central Asia. Chkalov employs a workforce of 30,000 and is one of the largest businesses in Uzbekistan.

=== Post-USSR ===
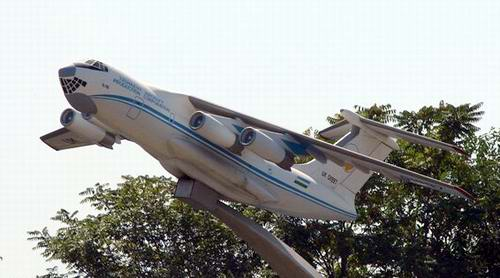
Il-76 on the entrance of Tashkent Aviation Production Association

Aircraft production featured the TD, MD, MF and TF variants of the Il-76 cargo aircraft, as well as the wings for the An-70 cargo aircraft. In September 1996 the Chkalov plant also began producing the IL-114T cargo aircraft and the IL-114 passenger version. The new generation of aircraft models IL-76MF and IL-76TF have a carrying capacity of over 52 tons and are equipped with new highly economic low-noise motors. The new variation of the IL-114-100 aircraft is powered by engines built by Pratt & Whitney, the Canadian subsidiary of Connecticut-based United Technologies Corp, with a service life of over 6000 flying hours. The base model of the Il-114 is powered by Russian-built TV-117C engines. The Il-114 and Il-114-100 are intended to replace aging Antonov An-24 and Yakovlev Yak-40 aircraft. Boeing has developed a cooperative effort with this company.

In early 1995, Prime Minister Utkur Sultanov requested U.S. Government assistance in transforming the Tashkent Aircraft Production Association named after Chkalov (TAPO) from a public sector military enterprise into a viable private sector commercial enterprise. In response, the U.S. Trade and Development Agency (TDA) approved two Technical Assistance Grants, in the amounts of US$1,000,000 and $600,000 respectively, to partially fund the cost of goods and services required to facilitate the development and sale of TAPO manufactured aircraft on commercial terms.

The Russian Ilyushin Production Complex was created in January 1997 to include all designers and producers of Il-family planes. As of 1998 the Ilyushin Complex included the Ilyushin R&D bureau; VASO (Voronezh Aircraft Manufacturing Enterprise); and TAPOiCh (Tashkent Chkalov Aircraft Manufacturing Enterprise). But Uzbek authorities requested US$300 million for putting the plant under Russian control. Although the TAPO was assembling the Il-76 cargo aircraft used by the Russian air force, Moscow found the asking price unreasonable. Given TAPO's successful export contracts to sell the Il-76 and Il-78, Uzbekistan decided to retain control over the TAPO.

On 17 June 1998 Vadim P. Kucherov, General Director of the Tashkent Aircraft Production Association (TAPO) signed the Prime Contractor's Contract with Emerging Markets Finance Corporation (EMFC), at the American Business Center in Tashkent. EMFC, U.S. based project consultancy firm specializing in CIS aviation projects, will coordinate the activities of Pratt & Whitney Canada, AlliedSignal Aerospace, Price Waterhouse, UzinvestProject and Uzavialeasing in formulating and implementing a financial structure to accommodate the sale/lease of the TAPO manufactured Il-114 aircraft within the CIS and abroad.

The Pratt & Whitney PW127H model, which received Canadian and Russian/CIS type certification in December 1999, powers a new passenger version of the Ilyushin IL-114 aircraft. The IL-114-100 is manufactured by the Tashkent Aircraft Production Organization (TAPO) in Tashkent, Uzbekistan and received its Russian type certificate on 27 December 1999. The launch customer is Uzbekistan Airways. The PW127J powers the MA-60, which entered service in September 1999 with Changan Airlines of Xian, China.

The plant expected to make a substantial profits in 2000, due to orders for IL-114s and modified Il-76s. The Il-76MF, the upgraded model, will be equipped with Snecma (French Company) engines. In addition, as cooperation with Russia's Ilyushin design bureau, the Plant will continue to work towards establishing market niche for its products on the world aircraft market. Agreements have been signed with the United Arab Emirates and China for fifteen Il-114-100 aircraft. The plant has been supplying latter country with 20 modified Il-76s. Work is under way on a contract concluded during the Uzbek president's visit to the People's Republic of China. Local Uzbek aircraft companies have also placed orders for three Il-114s with Canadian engines. The Plant was also contracted to carry out the complete overhaul of four Il-76s in service in India.

In March 2002 it was reported that a contract for the delivery to India of three Il-78 tankers was signed by the Tashkent AViation Production Association (TAPO). Negotiations continued with China for the delivery of an undisclosed number of Il-78 tanker airplanes under the aegis of Rosoboronehksport. In all approximately 45 Il-78 tankers were produced at TAPO. The cost of one airplane with delivery for export is estimated approximately at 25 - 35 million dollars.

In 2005, the company collected and delivered to customers 5 aircraft. In 2006 it completed the first of two IL-76TD-90VD ordered by the airline "Volga-Dnepr aircraft. According to the media, the value realized on exports in 2006, the aircraft (type not specified) amounted to 16 million dollars, representing 10% of planned volume. In 2007 it had collected two Il-114-100 for the national airline of Uzbekistan, one IL-76TD for Azerbaijan and one IL-76TD-90VD for the airline Volga-Dnepr.

Like most of the former Soviet aviation industry, TAPOiCh in the first half of 1990s was faced with serious economic difficulties caused by lack of state orders. The company began the outflow of skilled manpower, aggravated common to the former Soviet republics negative attitude to Russian-speaking population of the core staff of high-tech industries. Plant's survival in these conditions contributed to the existence of only aircraft that were the legacy of the Soviet Union. The most lucrative deal for TAPOiCh became a contract with India for six refueller Il-78MKI worth 152 million dollars. It was executed in 2004, factory orders was also manufacturing 3 IL-76 delivered to Azerbaijan, 2 aircraft ordered avikompaniya "Volga-Dnepr."

A better case obtained with other products of Tashkent: the passenger aircraft IL-114. The creation of this machine was completed in the late 1980s. And by 2008 the factory had about 30 of the Il-114 in various stages of assembly. In 2001, Uzbek national airline Uzbekiston havo YULLARI entered into a contract with TAPOiCh for the purchase of three Il-114 engines from Pratt & Whitney. In 2007, this was followed by a new agreement for another 6 aircraft. In May 2006, ZAO Tehnospetsstal-Engineering located in Saint Petersburg signed a contract with the GAO TAPOiCh to supply 30 Il-114 planes with Russian engines TV7-117S, its implementation should be completed in 2008. The company entered into another contract with IFC and MAK Ilyushin to supply 30 Il-114-100 for 4 years in July 2006. Also in 2007, Ilyushin signed a contract for the supply of two Russian airlines with 98 of the Il-114 aircraft.

The entry of the Tashkent Aircraft Production Association named Chkalov into the Russian United Aircraft Corporation was held 6 February 2008. The document on the integration TAPOiCh and the KLA in the presence of Vladimir Putin and Islam Karimov signed the first vice-premier Sergei Ivanov, Russia, and Vice-Premier - Minister of Finance of Uzbekistan Rustam Azimov. Ownership by OAK wad to move 50% plus 1 share of Tashkent aviation. The integration process was scheduled to be completed before the end of the year.

The economic situation in TAPOiCh was bad. The authorized capital was about 26.2 million US dollars. In 2006, the company made a loss of US$4.4 million against a net profit in 2005 of US$1.8 million. During 2008, experts from companies Ernst and Young and Deloitte and Touche conducted an independent assessment TAPOiCh. Then, as zavil OAK leader Alexei Fedorov, performed an additional issue of shares of OAK on the value of Tashkent plant to exchange them for a controlling stake in the Uzbek enterprises. Only after that would OAK receive a controlling stake in Tashkent plant. Uzbekistan

The Republic of Uzbekistan proclaimed its independence on 31 August 1991 and was recognized by the United States on 25 December 1991. Uzbekistan has lagged behind other former Soviet states in the pace of its reforms. Both politically and economically, Uzbekistan continues to resemble its former Soviet self. Uzbekistan’s relatively isolated economic position has served to shelter it somewhat from the economic turmoil surrounding in the other NIS countries. In October 1996, the IMF announced a suspension of the Stand-By Arrangement pending the establishment of corrective measures “consistent with the growth and inflation targets of the Uzbek government.” It was only in 1999 and 2000 that the IMF has resumed talks with the Government of Uzbekistan to reinstate the Stand-By Arrangement. This assistance to Uzbekistan comes with a number of conditions on the part of the IMF, however, including that Uzbekistan make real progress towards liberalizing its currency exchange and show real progress on economic reform.

President Karimov advocated what he referred to as “Eastern Democracy” and a controlled pace of reform for Uzbekistan. At the current time, the Government of Uzbekistan retains full control over all aspects of the economy, from major industries and facilities to the exchange rate of the soum. All of these control measures are part of the government’s overall policy to retain control of Uzbekistan’s transition from a Soviet economy to a free market system. The end result has been a system that resembles the Soviet Union more than any of the other countries in the NIS.

Privatization in Uzbekistan, like many other economic reforms, has been lagging. President Karimov announced a major privatization plan in October 1995, which is being implemented late in 1998–2000. Major Uzbekistani companies, unavailable to Western companies until this point, are due to be privatized, but initial reaction to these efforts has been lukewarm. While this plan is ambitious and represents a unique opportunity for investors interested in Uzbekistan, it is yet to be determined how successful this program will be. The first tender of this program, for the Almalyk Copper Plant, has been widely considered a failure due to lack of interest.

The next stage of denationalization and privatization of the Uzbekistan's industry sectors was started by special resolutions of Uzbekistan's Cabinet of Ministers in December 1999 and March 2000, which defined three groups of enterprises. The first one consists of 27 high-profile companies, which includes the Chkalov Aviation Production Association. The securities of these companies, which are in many ways the glory and might of the domestic economy, are scheduled to be sold in relation to individual projects because some of these companies have a strategic importance to the national economy. The state will hold 51 per cent of shares in a number of major enterprises, such as the Tashkent Chkalov Aviation Production Association state joint-stock company.

In March 2000 Russian Deputy Prime Minister Ilya Klebanov, who was in charge of the military-industrial complex, had a meeting with state adviser to the president of Uzbekistan on security issues Mirakbar Rahmonqulov in Moscow. They discussed the creation of joint ventures to maintain and update military hardware and the training of Uzbek specialists in aircraft and armoured hardware in Russia. Documents were prepared to form an interstate aviation company with participation of Chkalov. It was projected that by May 2000 Russian and Uzbekistan would sign documents and form one of the strongest and largest aviation concerns of the world.

The Uzbek-Swiss-German joint venture Hobas-TAPO (Tashkent) has begun production of non-metal pipes for pipelines in the republic's oil, gas and chemical industries. Fifty per cent of Hobas-TAPO output will be exported, and the rest will be sold on the domestic market. Hobas-Tapo was established at the end of 1997. On the Uzbek side, it includes the Tashkent-based Chkalov Aviation Corporation, which holds 50 per cent of the joint venture's charter fund. Swiss Hobas AG holds 47.5 per cent and German Wemex Handel GmbH 2.5 per cent of the fund.

== Post USSR production ==
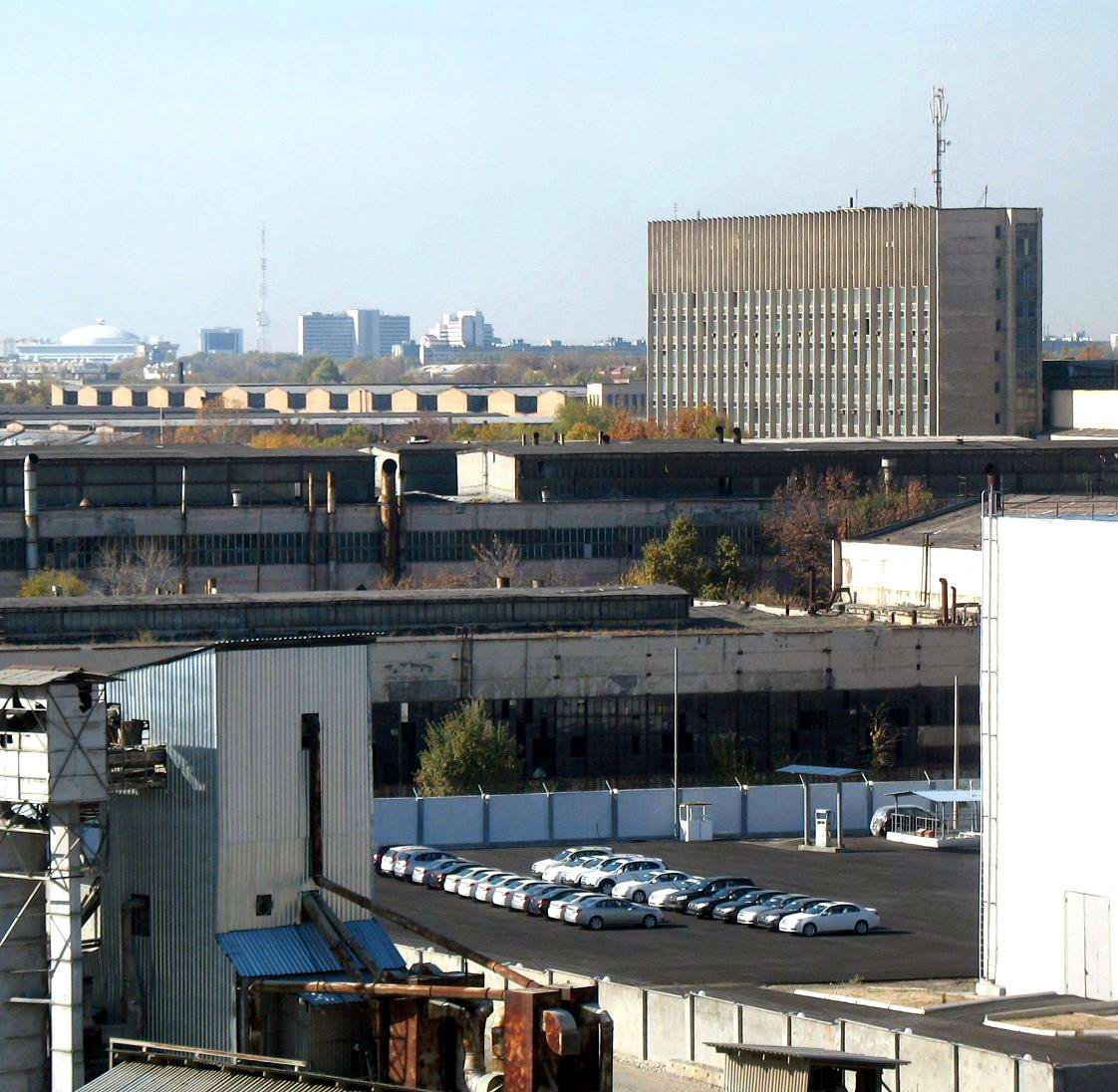
TAPOiCh in 2009

TAPOiCh lacked financing and technical parts from Russian partners in the aftermath of the collapse of the Soviet Union. Since 1991 has produced only about 10 Il-76MF/TF airframes, two of which are being completed for the Jordanian Air Force. The IL-76MF/TF series are the stretched IL-76.

The few military and civilian Il-76 and Il-78 that were delivered to the Indian Air Force and to a few civilian customers in recent years were completed on a large stock of previously-built, but unsold airframes, but all were based on the short original airframes, not the stretched version, all of which are still at the Tashkent factory.

In 2002, the company could build the first export version of the Il-114.

In 2005, was signed with China an order for 5 exemplars of Il-78. During the same year, three IL-76TDs were delivered to Beriev for conversion to Beriev A-50 standard and upgraded with Perm 90 for the Indian Air Force.

From 2006 to 2010, the factory delivered 5 civilian IL-76TD-90s to Volga-Dnepr and to Silk Way Airlines. These were fitted with new Perm 90 engines that meet ICAO Chapter IV standards, which are allowed to operate worldwide.

In June 2009, the factory delivered a civilian IL-76TD to Silk Way Airlines On 29 October 2010, the first production Il-76MF for the Jordanian Air Force was ferried to Moscow for further test and completion.

On 4 July 2007 reports emerged that TAPOiCh was to be included into the United Aircraft Building Corporation, and as from 2010 to 2012 was to produce 24 Il-76MF cargo planes for China, in cooperation with JV AviaStar of Ulyanovsk, Russia. The deal fell through, and the company never joined the Russian aviation holding.
