= Usolye, Usolsky District, Perm Krai =

Town in Perm Krai, Russia

Usolye Усолье
- Town
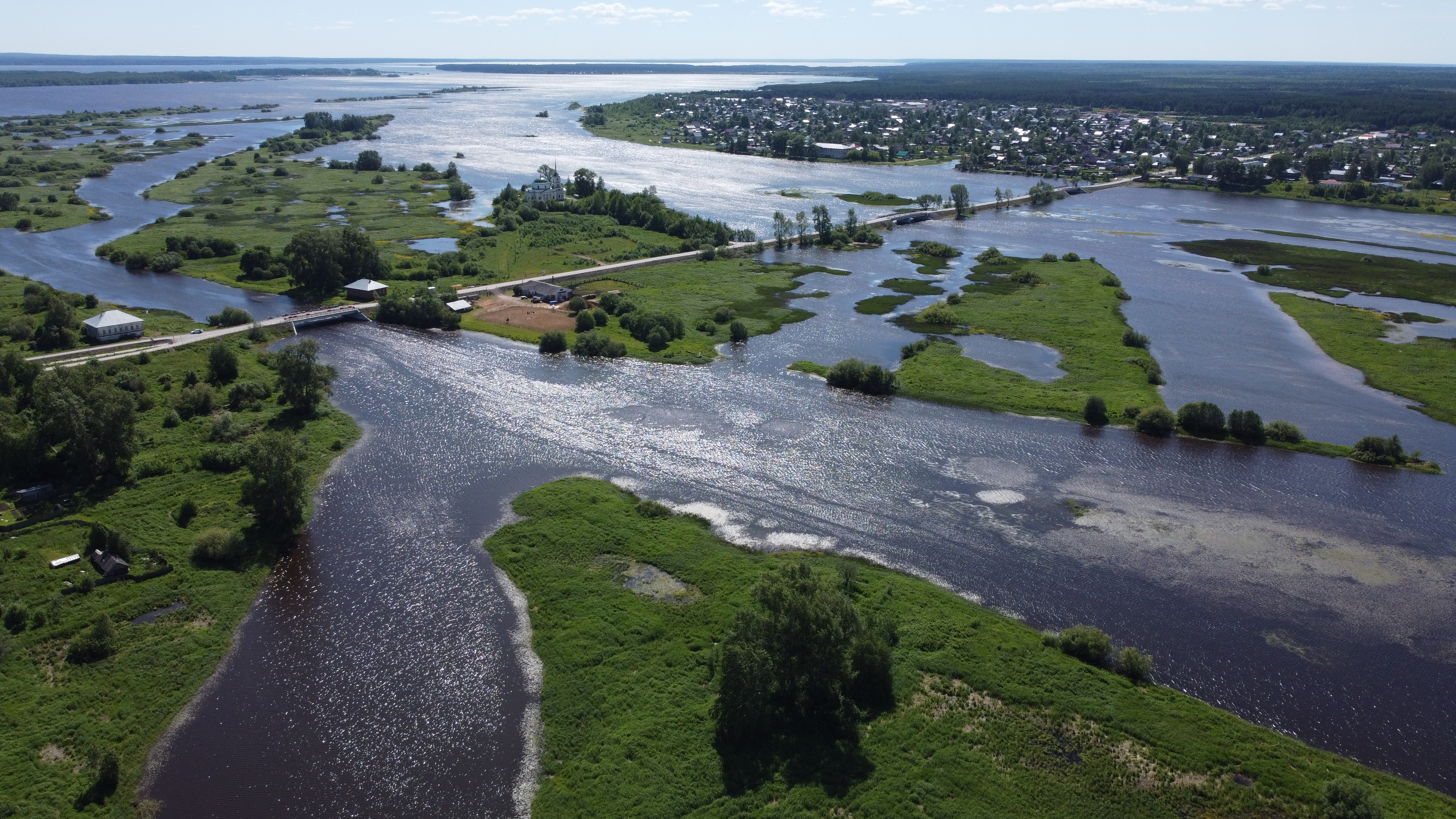
- The southern part of Usolye city and the Kama River

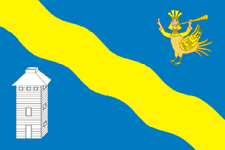
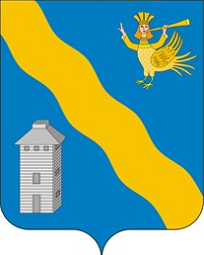
- Flag Coat of arms
- Interactive map of Usolye
- Location of Usolye Usolye (Perm Krai)
- Coordinates: 59°26′N 56°41′E
- Country: Russia
- Federal subject: Perm Krai
- Administrative district: Usolsky District
- Founded: 1606
- Town status since: 1940
- Elevation: 140 m (460 ft)

Population (2010 Census)
  - Total: 5,694
  - Estimate (2023): 6,489 (+14%)

Administrative status
  - Capital of: Usolsky District

Municipal status
  - Municipal district: Usolsky Municipal District
  - Urban settlement: Usolskoye Urban Settlement
  - Capital of: Usolsky Municipal District, Usolskoye Urban Settlement
- Time zone: UTC+5 (MSK+2)
- Postal code: 618460
- OKTMO ID: 57708000006

Usolye (Russian: Усо́лье) is a town and the administrative center of Usolsky District in Perm Krai, Russia, located on the right bank of the Kama River, opposite of the city of Berezniki and 190 kilometers (120 mi) north of Perm, the administrative center of the krai. As of the 2010 Census, its population was 5,694.

== History ==
It was founded in 1606 as a salt mining settlement of Novoye Usolye (Но́вое Усо́лье) and grew into a major salt mining center by the beginning of the 19th century. Until the end of the 18th century, it remained the Stroganov family's main locality on the Kama River. In 1895, there were forty salt wells.

In 1923, Usolye became the administrative center of Verkhnekamsky District of Ural Oblast. Between 1932 and 1940, it was a part of the town of Berezniki. It was granted town status in 1940. Due to the construction of Kama Reservoir, a portion of the town was flooded.

== Administrative and municipal status ==
Within the framework of administrative divisions, Usolye serves as the administrative center of Usolsky District, to which it is directly subordinated. As a municipal division, the town of Usolye, together with forty-eight rural localities, is incorporated within Usolsky Municipal District as Usolskoye Urban Settlement.

== Demographics ==
Historical population of Usolye
Year	1959	1970	1979	1989	2002	2010
Pop.	11,800	10,100	7,909	6,453	6,144	5,694
±%	—	—	—	−18.4%	−4.8%	−7.3%

== Culture ==
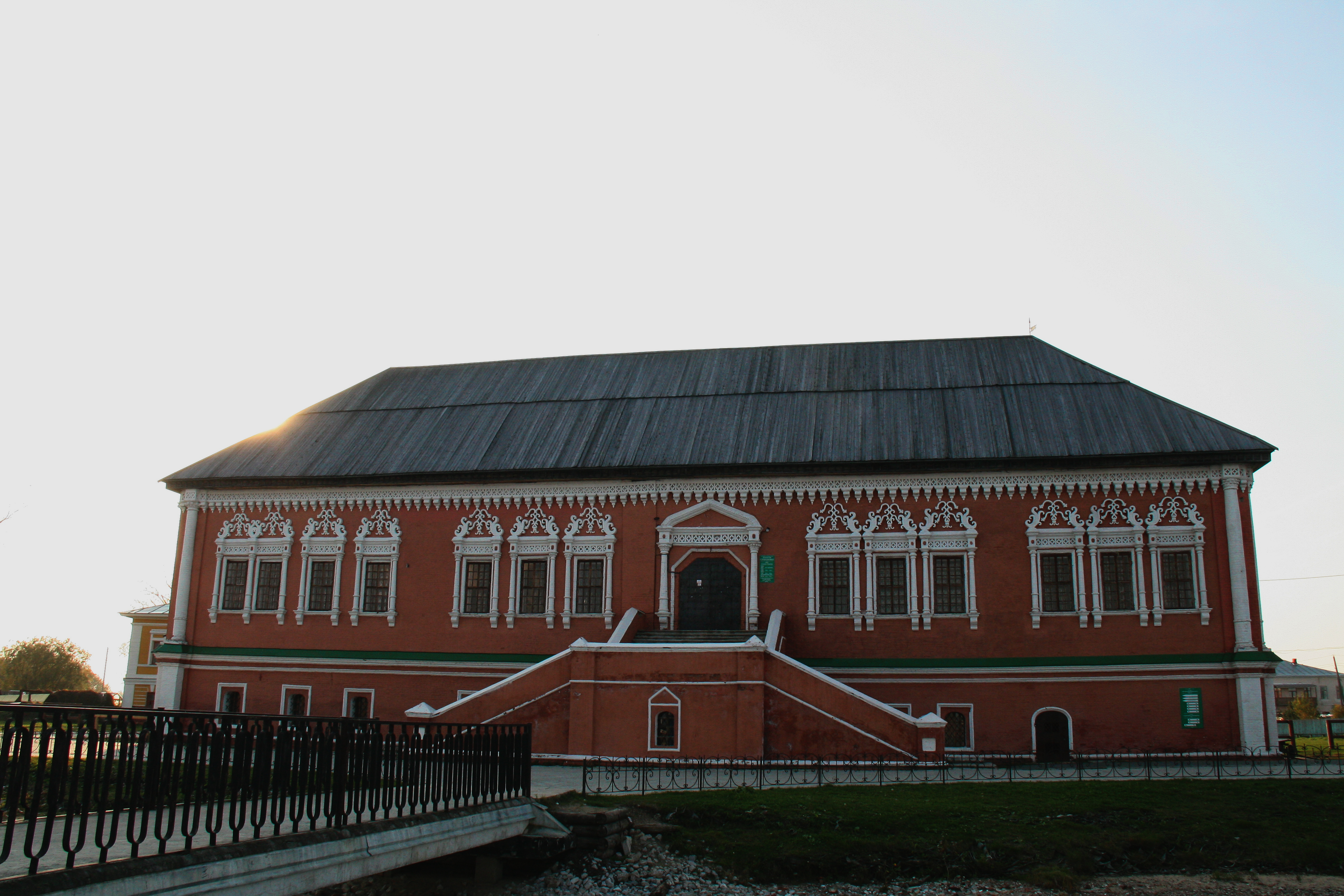
The house of the Stroganovs

Some architectural monuments of note include the Savior Cathedral (1724–1731) with a separate bell tower (1730); the house of the Stroganovs, and Galitzine homestead (1818), which houses an architectural and ethnographic museum. There are several churches and mansions near the town.
