= Tretyakovo Aerodrome =

Aerodrome in Russia

- IATA: none; ICAO: UUMT

Summary
- Airport type: experimental
- Owner: Russian Federation
- Operator: United Aircraft Corporation
- Location: Lukhovitsy
- Elevation AMSL: 515 ft (157 m)
- Coordinates: 54°54′18″N 39°1′36″E
- Interactive map of Tretyakovo Aerodrome

Runways
Direction	Length		Surface
Direction	ft	m	Surface
10/28	9,921	3,024	Concrete

Tretyakovo Aerodrome (Russian: Аэродром Третьяково) (ICAO: UUMT) is an experimental aerodrome in Lukhovitsy, Moscow Oblast, Russia located 25 km southeast of Kolomna and 56 km northwest of Ryazan. The airport is operated by the United Aircraft Corporation as part of the Lukhovitsy Aircraft Production and Test Complex (Russian: Луховицкий авиационный производственно-испытательный комплекс).

The production line for the Ilyushin Il-114-300 regional airliner, discontinued in Uzbekistan in 2012, has been established here after 2016, and the first testing plane was ready in 2021.

== See also ==
- List of airports in Russia
