= IRJ =

IRJ, a three letter acronym, may refer to:

- International Railway Journal
- Indian Regional Jet
- Insulated rail joint, an electrically insulated railjoint (see Fishplate)
- IATA code for Capitán Vicente Almandos Almonacid Airport in La Rioja, Argentina
