= Vasily Boryagin =

Vasily Pavlovich Boryagin (Russian: Василий Павлович Борягин, 1919–1998) was a prominent Russian fitter and production-rationalizer, Honored citizen of Berezniki, Hero of Socialist Labor.

Vasily Pavlovich Boryagin was born in 1919 in Lenva, Perm Krai, Russian SFSR. He graduated a high school and in 1937 he took a job at Berezniki Chemical Integrated Plant as a fitter's apprentice. In 1939 he was conscripted to the Army and served in border troops at Russian Far East.

After demobilization in 1946 Boryagin returned to Berezniki and took a job at Soda Factory. He worked there until 1989 as a leader of repair fitters team. Boryagin made a number of rationalization proposal. In 1971 for assembling new machines and ensuring functioning of obsolete equipment during the construction of new shop he was awarded a title of Hero of Socialist Labor and an Order of Lenin.

In 1974 Boryagin prize for leading workers of chemical industry was founded in Perm Region. In 1984 Boryagin was awarded a title of Honored citizen of Berezniki.

Vasily Pavlovich Boryagin died in 1998. In 2004 a memorial tablet was installed on a house where he lived (12 Stepanov Street, Berezniki).
