= Pushkin High School =

Pushkin High School is a comprehensive high school in the city of Berezniki in Perm Krai oblast, Russia. Former Russian president Boris Yeltsin was educated there. There is also a high school by the same name in the city of Syktyvkar in Komi, Russia.
