= CASA 3000 =

Cancelled aircraft

General information
- Type: Regional airliner
- National origin: Spain
- Manufacturer: Construcciones Aeronáuticas SA
- Status: Project abandoned
- Number built: 0

The CASA 3000 was a proposed turboprop aircraft aimed at the regional airliner market. The project was proposed by Construcciones Aeronáuticas SA (CASA) during the early part of the 1990s.

CASA initially proposed that it would feature a fuselage based on that of the Russian Ilyushin Il-114, mated to a wing based on the Saab 2000's wing, which was being produced by CASA for Saab. CASA proposed that the fuselage of the Ilyushin Il-114 be stretched to allow for 70 passenger seats. Changes to the Il-114's fuselage design would also be made, necessary to conform to differing airworthiness regulations existing outside the Soviet Union.

After talks with Ilyushin broke down, CASA then announced the aircraft would feature a fuselage of its own design. Despite predicting a market for up to 1,000 aircraft of its class, CASA abandoned the project without any aircraft being built.

== Specifications ==
Data from Forecast International

General characteristics

- Capacity: single aisle, four-abreast, 68-78 passengers, 72 at 32-inch (81-cm) pitch
- Length: 29.7 m (97 ft 5 in)
- Wingspan: 27.67 m (90 ft 9 in)
- Height: 8.68 m (28 ft 6 in)
- Empty weight: 17,200 kg (37,920 lb)
- Max takeoff weight: 28,300 kg (62,391 lb)
- Powerplant: 2 × GMA AE 2100 class turboprop, 3,691 kW (4,950 hp) each at takeoff

Performance

- Cruise speed: 648 km/h (403 mph, 350 kn)
- Range: 1,402 km (871 mi, 757 nmi)

== See also ==
Aircraft of comparable role, configuration, and era

- ATR 72
- BAe ATP
- Bombardier Dash 8
- Ilyushin Il-114
- Saab 2000
