= Ilyushin Il-114 =

Russian regional airliner

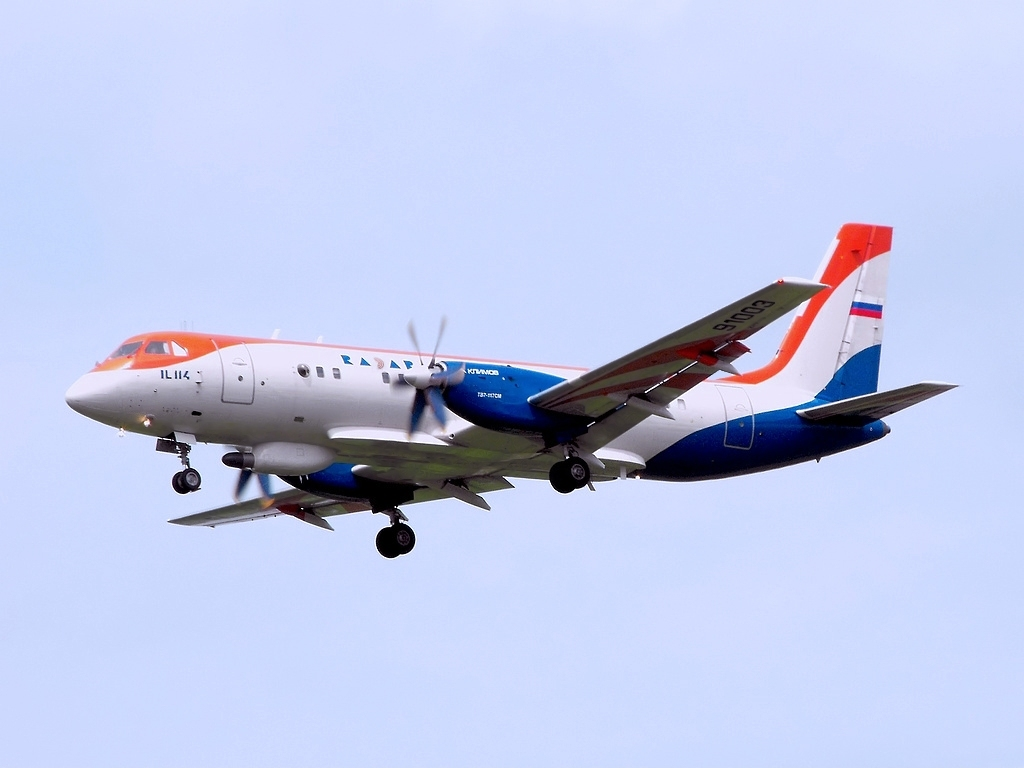
- RADAR Il-114-100

General information
- Type: Turboprop Regional airliner
- National origin: Soviet Union; Russia / Uzbekistan
- Designer: Ilyushin
- Built by: Initial: Tashkent Mechanical Plant; Resumption: Voronezh Aircraft Production Association jointly with Corporation MiG
- Status: Retired; to be reintroduced in Russia
- Primary users: Uzbekistan Airways (former) Vyborg Airlines (former)
- Number built: 22

History
- Manufactured: 1992–2012; 2016–present
- Introduction date: 27 August 1998 with Uzbekistan Airways (first)
- First flight: 29 March 1990

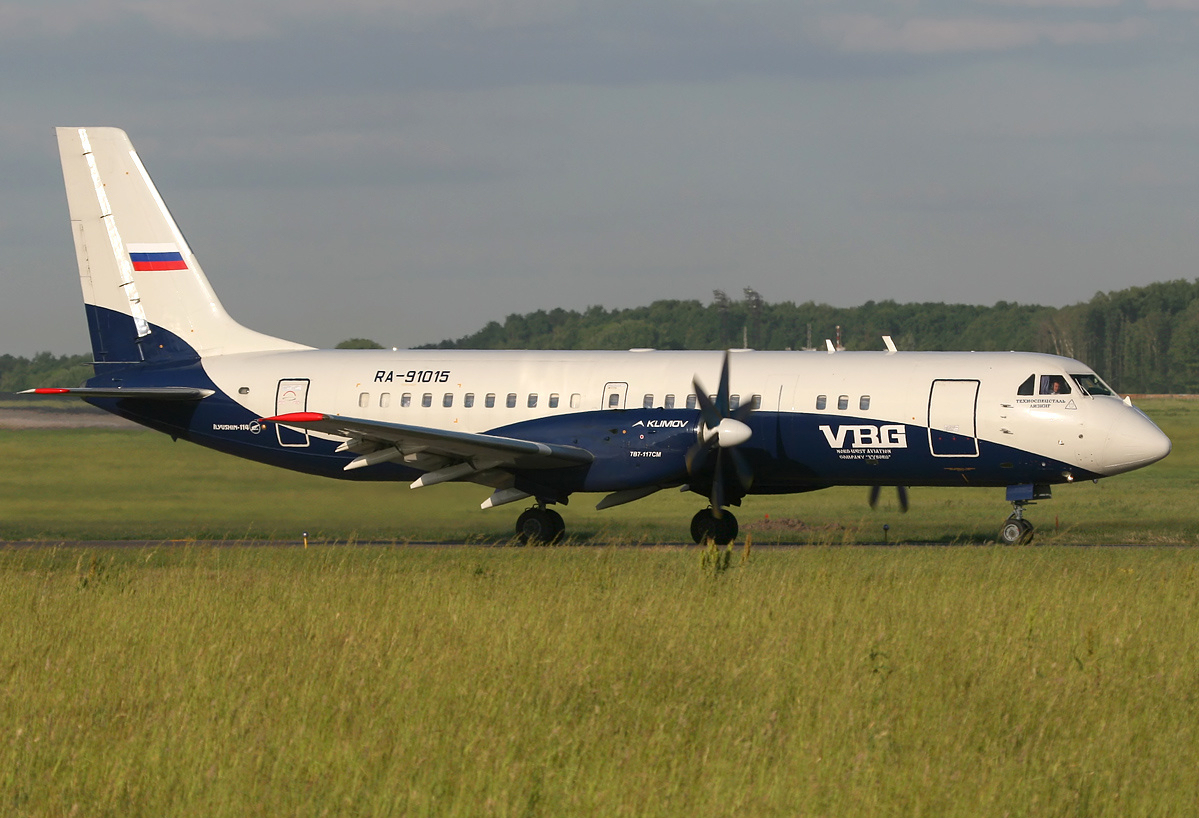
Il-114 of the Vyborg Airlines, 2007

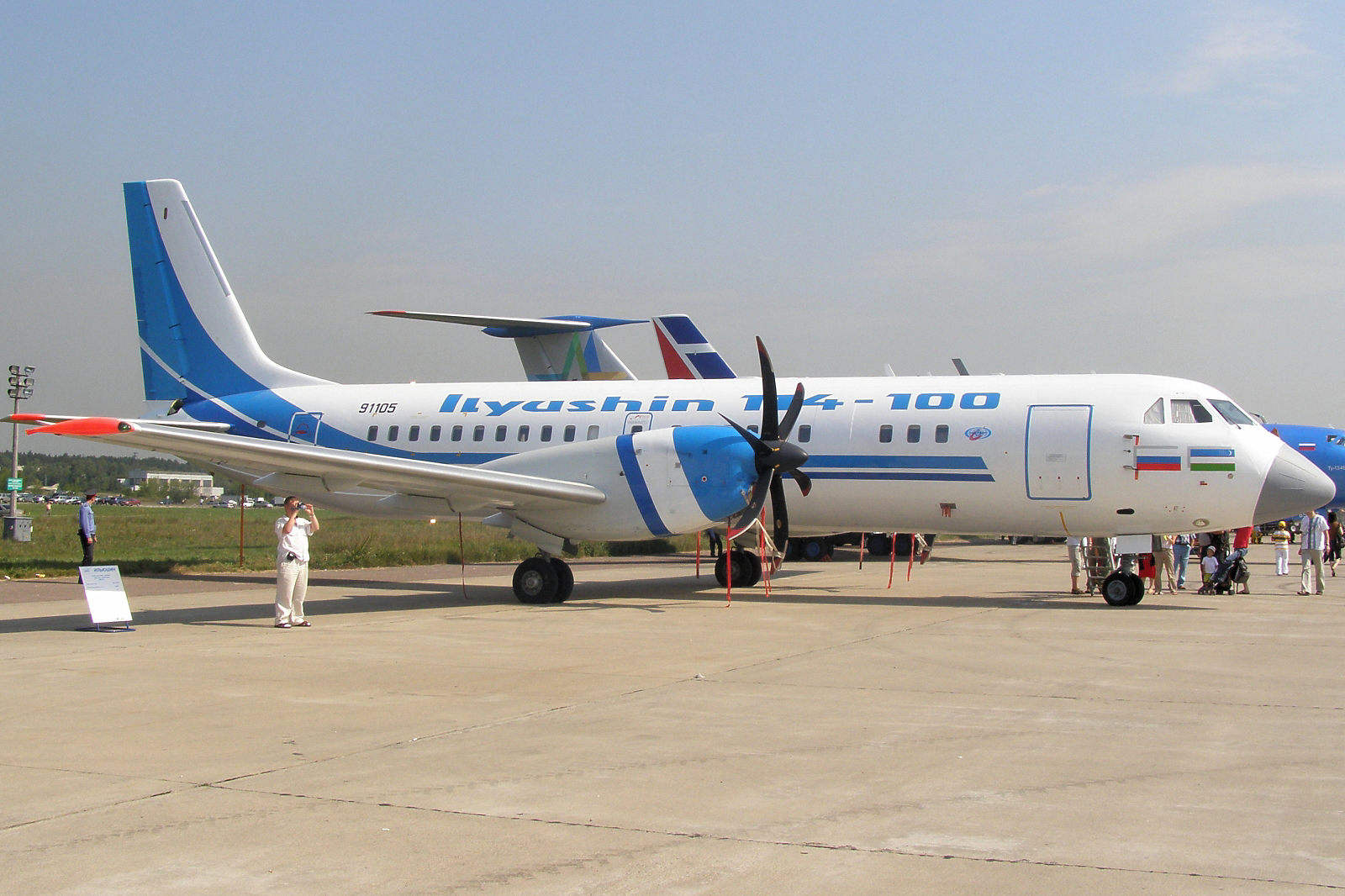
Il-114-100 at the MAKS Airshow in Moscow, 2007

The Ilyushin Il-114 (Russian Илью́шин Ил-114) is a twin-engine turboprop, short-haul regional airliner developed by the Ilyushin design bureau. The programme was launched in June 1986 by the Soviet Ministry of Aviation Industry and first flew on 29 March 1990. Initial plans envisioned the production of up to one-hundred aircraft per year, taking place in the Uzbek SSR. While development was initially expected to be straightforward, work was complicated by organisational and financial problems caused by the dissolution of the Soviet Union as well as the crash of a prototype aircraft.

Serial production began in 1992 at the Tashkent Aircraft Production Association. However, following the dissolution of the Soviet Union, the loss of skilled labour, and poor financial state of both Russia and Uzbekistan, aircraft were built at a laggard rate, unable to compete with foreign aircraft such as the ATR 72. The last aircraft was produced in 2012 due to the bankruptcy of the plant, with a total of 20 aircraft.

In 2014, United Aircraft Corporation began exploring the possibility of restarting production, as a result of international sanctions imposed on Russia as a result of the annexation of Crimea. The aircraft would be designated the Il-114-300, with the expected goal of replacing the aging Antonov An-24, as well as foreign aircraft such as the ATR 72. The first flight of a prototype aircraft, based on an existing Il-114-100 took place on 16 December 2020. Work was temporarily paused in 2021 after the crash of a prototype Il-112 aircraft, which uses the same TV7-117 engines as the Il-114. Flight tests resumed in 2024, with two newly built aircraft being built at the Lukhovitsy Aircraft Plant.

Preliminary flight testing was completed in January 2026, with serial production expected later in the year. In March 2026, it was reported that type certification was expected to be granted shortly, the first in all Russian-made plane. On 5 June 2026, type certification for the Il-114-300 was granted by the Russian Federal Air Transport Agency.

Serial production is expected later in 2026, and first commercial flight in 2027, with ramp up production expected in 2028.

== Development ==
In June 1986, the Ilyushin OKB began work on a replacement for the Antonov An-24, large numbers of which remained in service with Aeroflot. The Soviet Ministry of the Aviation Industry set down requirements for the An-24 replacement, including the ability to carry 60 passengers over a range of 1,000 kilometres (620 mi) at a speed of 500 kilometres per hour (310 mph), while using much less fuel than its predecessor and retaining the ability to operate out of poorly equipped airfields with unpaved runways. Development of the new aircraft was expected to be relatively simple, with the first flight programmed to take place in 1989, with service entry in 1992.

The first prototype made its maiden flight from Zhukovsky Airfield on 29 March 1990. Development was slowed by technical problems (including delays with the TV7-117 engines), and by organisational and financial problems associated with the breakup of the Soviet Union, with the Il-114 to be built at the Tashkent Aviation Production Association in soon-to-be independent Uzbekistan. The second prototype did not fly until 24 December 1991. This second prototype crashed, killing seven of nine people aboard, on 5 July 1993, causing the Russian government to withdraw funding from the Il-114, although the OKB continued development with its own money. The Il-114 finally received airworthiness certification on 26 April 1997.

=== Further development ===
==== Il-114-300 ====
===== Production restart =====
During the 2013 MAKS Air Show in Zhukovsky, the Russian state corporation Rostec signed an agreement with Bombardier to establish the joint production of the Bombardier Q400 NextGen regional airliner at the Aviastar-SP aircraft factory in Ulyanovsk. In addition, the Antonov An-140, a joint venture between Russia, Ukraine and Iran, was produced by Aviakor in Samara since 2005. Following the Euromaidan in Ukraine, and the Crimean crisis, plans for licensed production were suspended by Bombardier. Later, in 2014, the newly instated Ukrainian government banned all military-technical cooperation with Russia, putting the viability of continued An-140 production in jeopardy, as a result of the aircraft's use of components from both countries. With the defection of Antonov product manager Sergey Merenkov to Russia, production of the An-140 continued until 2016.

With these two options no longer viable, the Russian government ordered a study into the resumption of the Ilyushin Il-114 at the Aviakor plant, with the last aircraft having been produced two years earlier in Tashkent, Uzbekistan. In September 2014, Russian deputy prime minister in charge of the defense industry Dmitry Rogozin announced that the An-140 would be replaced with an updated variant of the Il-114, in addition to the Ilyushin Il-112 light military transport.

In 2015, it was proposed that the aircraft would be produced at the Sokol Aircraft Plant in Nizhny Novgorod. Ilyushin clarified that design work on an updated aircraft was underway, designated as the Il-114-300. The aircraft would be created under the model of import substitution, with components sourced in Russia. Specialised variants for cargo, arctic and military patrol were additionally proposed. During the 2015 MAKS Air Show, United Aircraft Corporation president Yuri Slyusar stated that the company was in favour of building the Il-114-300, but was awaiting government endorsement.

In 2016, it was reported that production would take place at the Sokol Aircraft Plant. Resumption of production was estimated to cost 56 billion rubles from the state budget until 2025. The United Engine Corporation stated that it would be ready to begin deliveries of Klimov TV7-117 engines by 2018. In August 2016, the General Director of Ilyushin Sergei Velmozhkin claimed that serial production would begin as early as 2021. Velmozhkin further stated that a variant for export equipped with Pratt & Whitney engines was also under consideration. In September 2016, it was reported that design work on the Il-114-300 was underway, with work performed by the Ilyushin and Myasishchev design bureaus. In December, 1.51 billion rubles were allocated to United Aircraft Corporation and United Engine Corporation for the production of the Il-114 aircraft and TV7-117 engine.

In early 2017, it was announced that final assembly of the Il-114-300 would instead take place at the Lukhovitsky Aircraft Plant, with flight testing planned for the next year. During the Aero India 2017 air show, designer Nikolai Talikov remarked that component assembly would take place at the Sokol and Voronezh aircraft plants, with final assembly in Lukhovitsky. During the 2017 Paris Air Show a memorandum of understanding between Pratt & Whitney Canada and Ilyushin was signed to provide two PW127H engines to restart the Ilyushin Il-114-100 regional turboprop aircraft program.

In July 2017, it was announced that Russia's United Aircraft Corp. (UAC) had signed a letter of intent with State Transport Leasing Co. for 50 Ilyushin Il-114-300s. Although the delivery schedule was not disclosed, the manufacturer and lessor are expected to sign a preliminary agreement on terms and conditions before the end of 2017. In 2017, the Kremlin injected ₽9.6 billion ($153 million) into the Il-114-300 and for three years from 2018, UAC plans to invest ₽7.66 billion ($122 million) for the Il-114-300.

In September 2017, flight testing of the Klimov TV7-117ST engine began using an Il-76LL aircraft.

From February 2020, an existing Il-114 was modified to Il-114-300 specifications using entirely domestic parts and modern technology. The new variant would carry 68 passengers, with a range of 2000 km. The converted Il-114 made its first flight on 16 December 2020 from Zhukovsky Airfield. The aircraft was fitted with Klimov TV7-117ST-01 engines and Aerosila AV-112-114 propellers, with an improved takeoff power of 3,100 hp (2,300 kW). Further improvements include the installation of an Aerosila TA-14-114 auxiliary power unit, and the TsPNK-114M2 digital avionics suite developed by Concern Radio-Electronic Technologies. A second flight took place on 19 January 2021.

In June 2022, the Government of Russia announced an ambitious plan to re-invigorate its commercial aircraft industry, following further western sanctions. The plan aims for 80 percent of the countries commercial aircraft fleet to be domestically built by 2030. Included in these plans was the aim for 70 Ilyushin Il-114-300 aircraft to be produced by the end of the decade.

===== Engine development delays =====
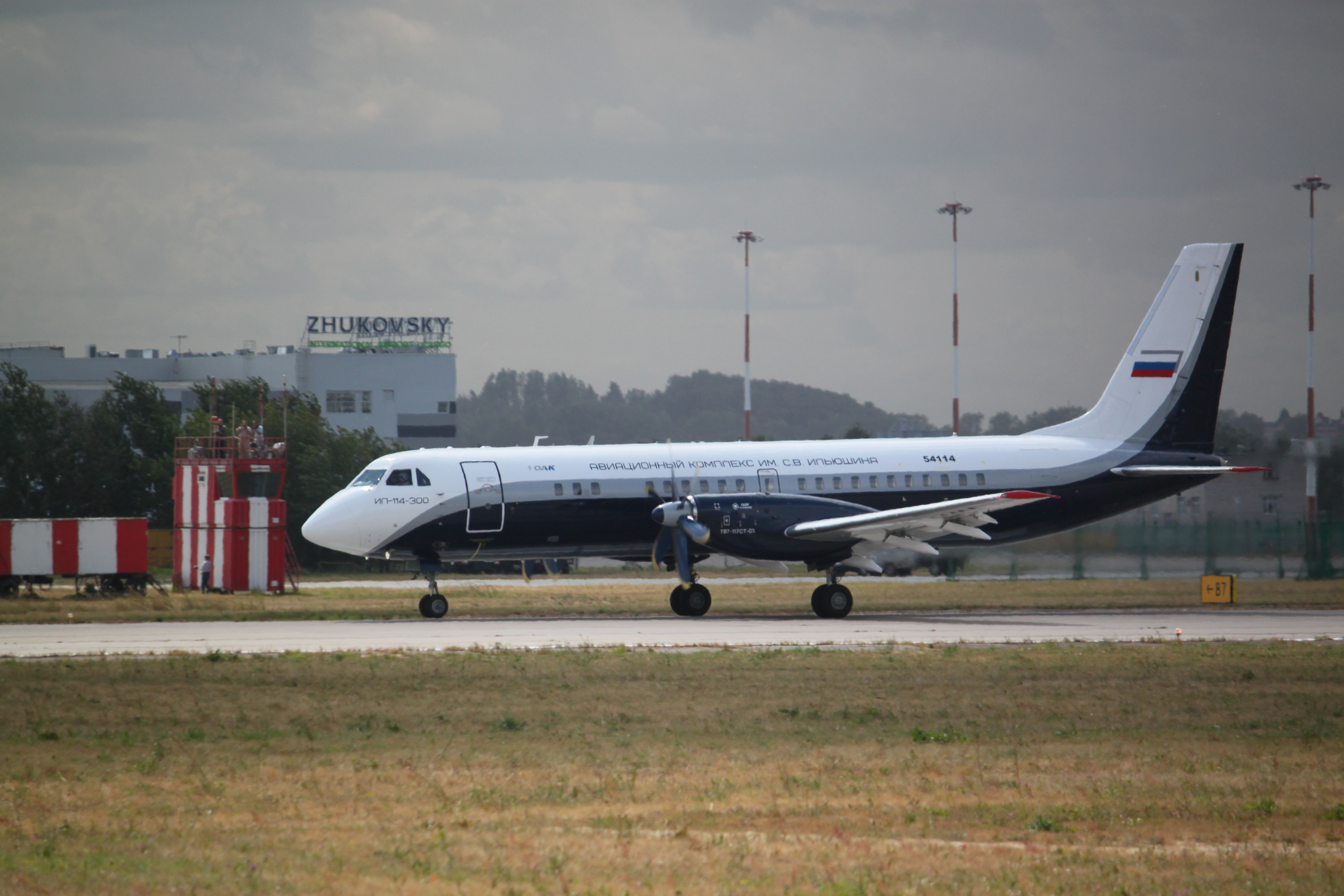
Il-114-300 prototype with Klimov TV7-117ST-01 engines

Flight tests were paused in 2021 after the crash of a prototype Ilyushin Il-112 on 17 August 2021 at Kubinka, equipped with the same TV7-117 engines. An investigation conducted by the Interstate Aviation Committee and Minpromtorg attributed the cause of the crash to technical issues with the starboard TV7-117ST engine. Other aircraft which use the same engine such as the Mil Mi-38 were also temporarily grounded. As a result, the prototype was prevented from taking part in the "Army-2021" forum.

In January 2023, the Federal Air Transport Agency issued the type certificate for the TV7-117ST-01 engine after design issues were reportedly resolved.

===== Flight testing =====
In March 2024, flight tests resumed at Tretyakovo. The first new prototype made its maiden flight on 31 March 2024 piloted by Sergei Sukhar, Igor Zinov and Oleg Gryazev. Certification tests would continue throughout 2024.

In March 2025, a second prototype took flight from Tretyakovo. In October 2025, certification flights began, with test flights taking place at Gorno-Altaysk Airport, in the Altai Republic. Flights were carried out between Lukhovitsy, Gorno-Altaysk and Baikonur in Kazakhstan. Rostec CEO Sergei Chemezov stated that certification was expected to be completed by early 2026, with deliveries to begin in August 2026 On 14 November 2025 the type certificate for the AV-112-114 six-blade propeller developed by Aerosila was issued by the Federal Air Transport Agency.

On 19 November 2025 it was reported that 190 out of 270 test flights had been completed, with certification expected in early 2026. Furthermore, on 3 December 2025, Daniil Brenerman, the managing direction of Ilyushin, stated the aircraft was being prepared for the final stage of testing. A newly developed cabin was also revealed, created by the Russian based Aviation Interiors LLC, a video of which was shared by the Ministry of Industry and Trade. In late December 2025, UAC general director Vadim Badekha stated that the aircraft had completed most of its certification flights, with a small number of tests awaiting the end of winter before completion in 2026. By 28 January 2026, certification flights had been completed, pending approval from the Russian Federal Air Transport Agency.

In early 2026, a prototype Il-114-300 aircraft underwent additional cold weather testing in Yakutia at temperatures as low as -45 degrees celsius. The aircraft underwent testing at Yakutsk International Airport and Magan Airport. On 17 February 2026, Daniil Brenerman stated that the aircraft was expected to be fully approved by August 2026, with several environmental tests ongoing. In early 2026, a prototype Il-114, alongside prototype Yakovlev SJ-100 and Yakovlev MC-21 aircraft underwent additional extreme climate testing at Talagi Airport in Arkhangelsk. It was further reported that the development of further modifications for extreme weather conditions, including the inclusion of additional foreign object damage shields was also underway.

In March 2026, the Federal Air Transport Agency reported that all flight and bench tests had been completed, with environmental testing underway. It was stated that type certification was expected in May 2026. Interior elements, such as new light-weight cabin seats also been certified.

===== Certification =====
In April 2026, Deputy Head of the Ministry of Industry and Trade Gennady Abramenkov stated that the aircraft had fully completed its base flight certification program, after carrying out 336 certification flights. Furthermore, the manufacture of the first three serial production aircraft for the 2nd Arkhangelsk United Aviation Division had begun.

On 5 June 2026, during the XXIX St. Petersburg International Economic Forum, the Russian Federal Air Transport Agency announced that type certification for the Il-114-300 had been granted. At the same event, an agreement between UAC, GTLK and the 2nd Arkhangelsk United Aviation Division was signed for the lease of the first three production aircraft. It was reported that the aircraft would enter low rate initial production, with construction capacity increasing further in 2028. While the aircraft was being tested in adverse weather and environmental conditions, in line with standard industry practice, the base type certification imposes restrictions on the operational use of the aircraft. These will be gradually loosened as further operational data is collected, through further testing and entry into service. During the 2026 Innoprom industrial exhibition, the Minister of Industry and Trade Anton Alikhanov stated that the aircraft was expected to receive an updated certificate for operation on unpaved airstrips by 2027.

From July-August 2026, the Il-114-300 underwent further certification tests under hot climate conditions in Bukhara, Uzbekistan, performing a nonstop flight from Zhukovsky, covering a distance of 2,730 km. In temperatures up to 42 degrees, twenty two test flights with a total duration of more than thirty hours were conducted.

In October 2026, certification was granted by Rosaviatsiya for several components, including cabin seats and icing systems.

==== Prospective maritime patrol aircraft ====
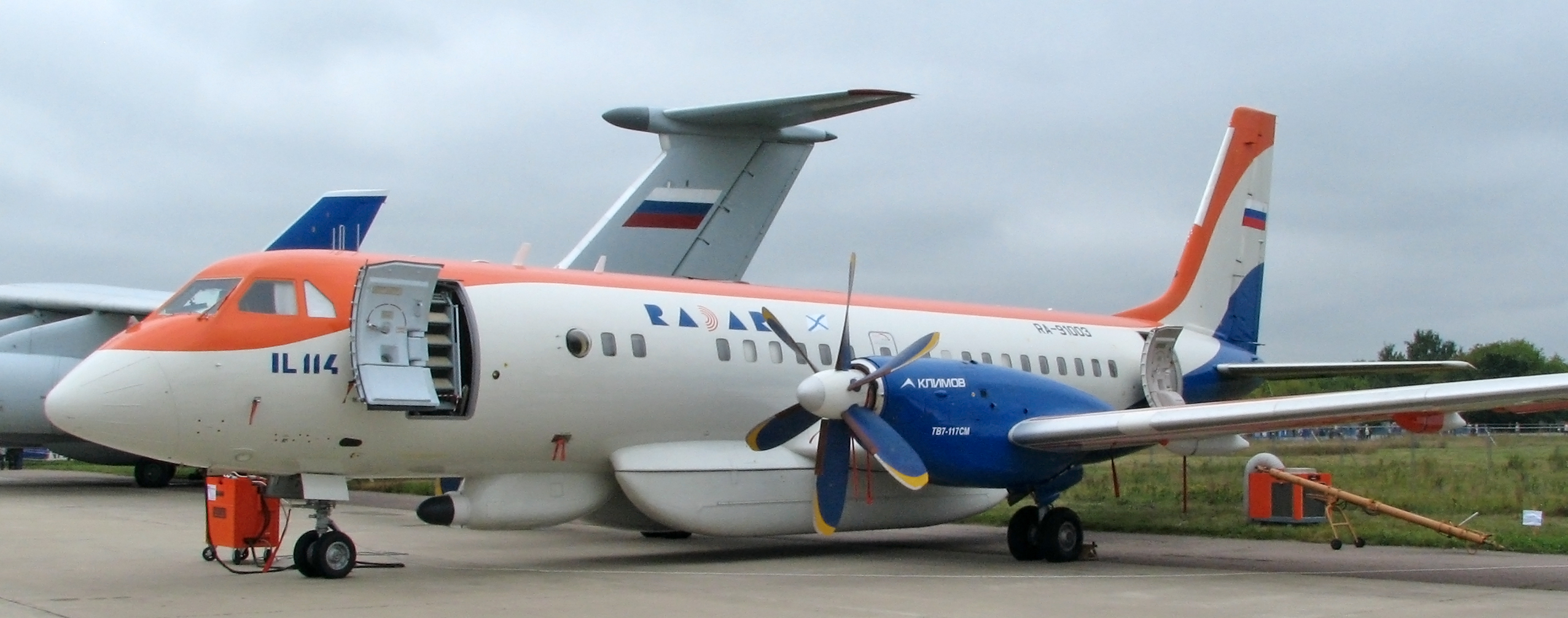
Ilyushin Il 114 at the MAKS Airshow, 23 August 2009

From 2005, an Il-114 was converted into a flying testbed by Agat and Radar-MMS. With a capability to loiter for 14 hours, Agat and Radar-MMS have turned it into an advanced-technology maritime patrol aircraft (MPA) demonstrator. Il-114 RA93001 aircraft demonstrated the transmission of telemetry and targeting data in real time using a wide-band secure datalink using the Kasatka rescue and targeting complex during IMDS’2015 maritime show. This Il-114 has a FLIR under the nose, a magnetometer in the tail section, a semi-automatic sonobuoy dispenser, and two pylons under the fuselage for sensor pods or Kh-35 anti-ship missiles. On the right side of the fuselage, a GSh-2-23 twin-barrel 23-mm rapid fire cannon pod can be installed, with conformal metric-band antennas on both sides. This aircraft has two radars, one (KS-9) working in metric waveband (range up to 50 km) and the other (KS-1 or Zarya) in centimetric waveband (range 300 km). An additional antenna is in an underbelly dome for 360-degree coverage.

The Russian naval service chief Maj. Gen. Igor Kozhin announced that the Russian navy is looking for "a modern and suitable universal platform" to replace the aging Il-20/Il-38 MPA fleet. Selection will be made in the period of 2015–16. A Maritime Patrol version of the Il-114 twin-turboprop airliner most likely will be a candidate. According to Georgy Antsev, general director and designer for Morinformsystem-Agat, "In my view, the Il-114 is the best choice for the Russian navy". Companies promoting the Il-114 as an MPA include Agat, Ilyushin, Radar-MMS and others.

=== Licensed production in India ===
In 2016, the Il-114-300 was offered to India under the Make in India initiative.

In December 2025, during the 23rd India – Russia summit, Sergey Chemezov, the head of Rostec, stated that Russia and India had begun discussing the joint production of Yakovlev SJ-100 and Ilyushin Il-114 aircraft.

In January 2026, a prototype Il-114-300 aircraft made the journey from Russia to Begumpet Airport in Hyderabad, India to take part in the Wings India 2026 airshow. While in the country, a return test flight from Hyderabad to the coastal city of Chennai was conducted, covering a distance of 1,300 km.

On 28 January 2026, during the Wings India 2026 airshow in Hyderabad, UAC and Flamingo Aerospace signed a preliminary agreement for supply of six Il-114-300 aircraft. UAC will provide Flamingo Aerospace with a roadmap for the development of aviation competencies. This will allow the Indian company to gradually increase the ability to build, modify, maintenance, repair and overhaul of aircraft, as well as infrastructure development.

In September 2026, it was reported that progress was underway to validate the Russian type certificate with the Indian Directorate General of Civil Aviation.

== Design ==
=== Airframe ===
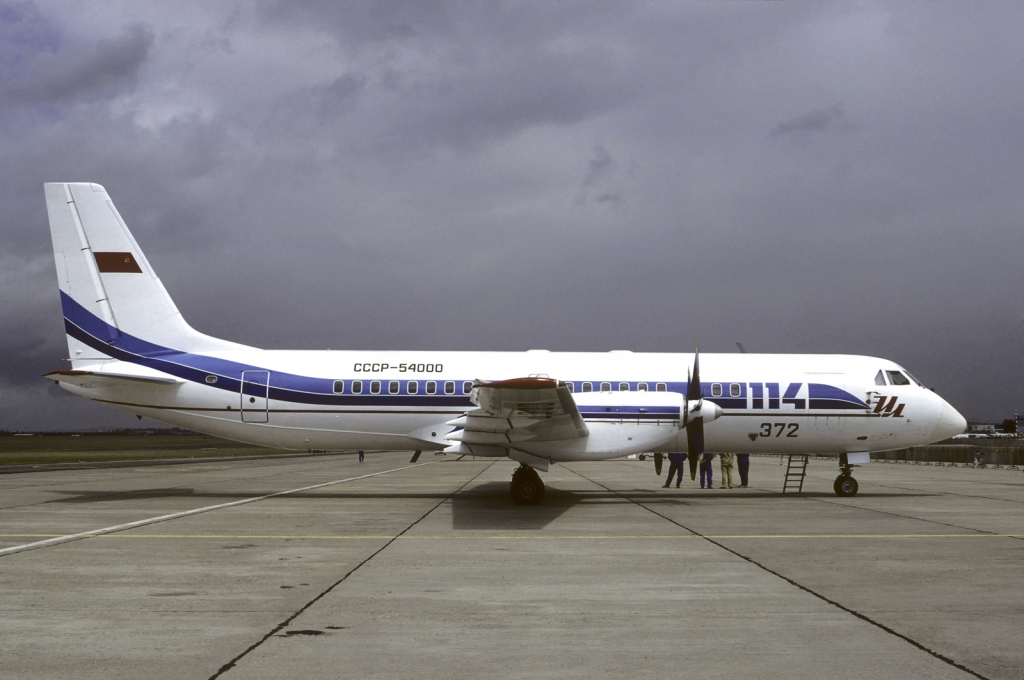
Side view

The Ilyushin Il-114 is a low-wing cantilever monoplane with a conventional swept empennage with a single vertical stabiliser and rudder. The airframe is constructed mainly of metal, with composite materials used in the wing box, dorsal fin, ailerons, spoilers, wing-root fairings and radome. The aircraft has retractable tricycle nosewheel undercarriage, while double-slotted trailing edge flaps are fitted to the wings. Up to 64 passengers are accommodated in the aircraft's cabin, with passengers' baggage carried in compartments at the front and rear of the cabin, rather than under the cabin floor.

A low wing configuration was chosen, as opposed to earlier aircraft such as the Antonov An-24 with a high wing design, in order to reduce the landing gear height and weight, ease maintenance, and improve reliability on short and unpaved runways. The updated Il-114-300 features an increased dihedral, with a modified wing geometry and engine nacelles, resulting in improved flight stability and takeoff/landing performance.

For the original production run, interior components from foreign suppliers were used. Newly built aircraft will feature seating, wall panels, galley and lavatory components supplied by the Russian company Aviation Interiors. Seats are organised in a 2–2 layout, with a single galley and lavatory situated in the aft of the cabin. In late March 2026, the RA60 passenger seats designed and built by Aviation Interiors received certification from the Federal Air Transport Agency. For aircraft manufactured in cooperation with the India based Flamingo Aerospace, seats are expected to be provided by Timetooth Technologies.

=== Flight deck ===
The primary flight controls are mechanical, with controls commanded using a mechanical yoke and pedals. Unlike previous Soviet airliners such as the Antonov An-24, which had a large flight crew, the Il-114 is flown by a crew of two, who are provided with cathode-ray tube based electronic flight instruments provided by either the NIIAO TsPNK-114 complex, or a stack produced by Rockwell Collins Aerospace. The Il-114-300 includes cockpit improvements such as the TsPNK-114M2 digital avionics suite developed by Concern Radio-Electronic Technologies. This system allows the aircraft to operate in ICAO Category II conditions, with information being displayed on five LCD displays.

Ilyushin Il-114 avionics variations

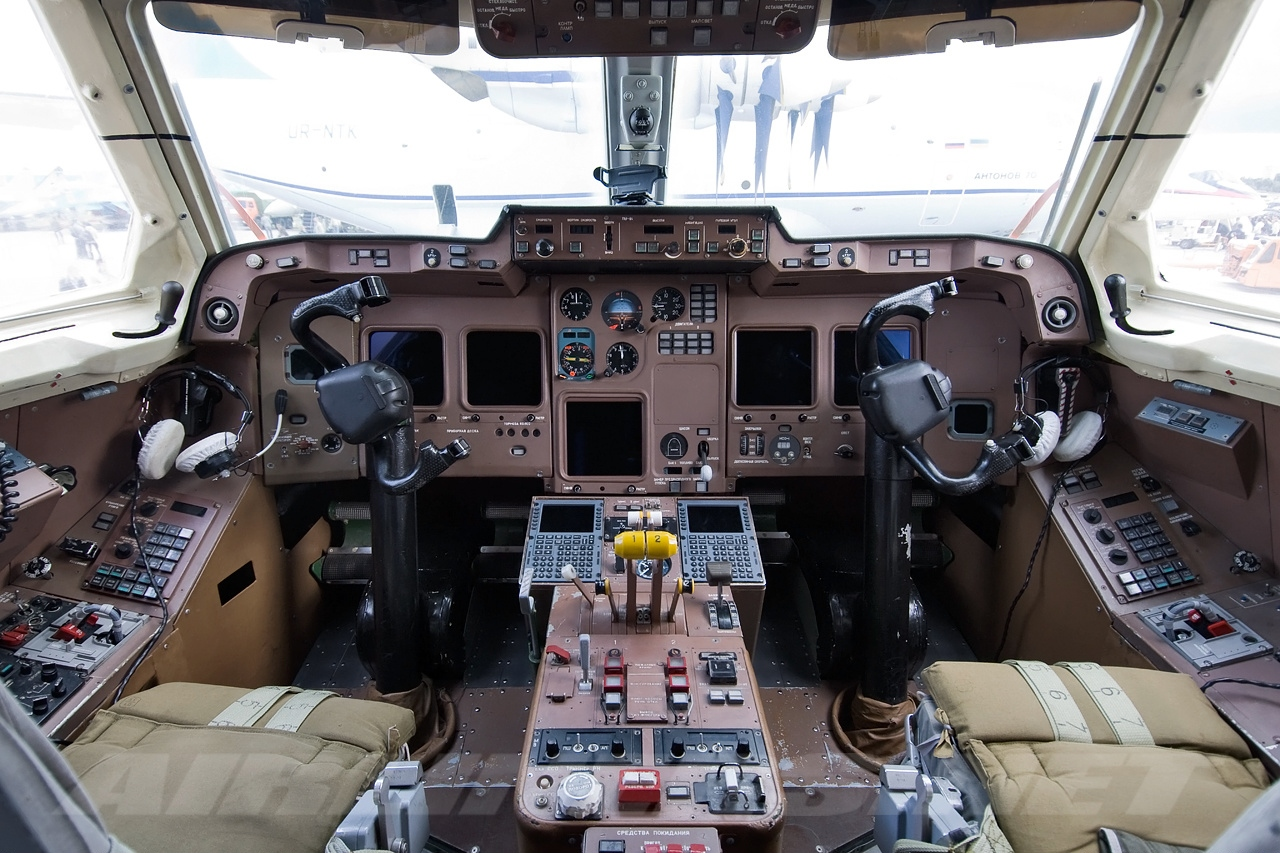
Cockpit view with NIIAO TsPNK-114 avionics

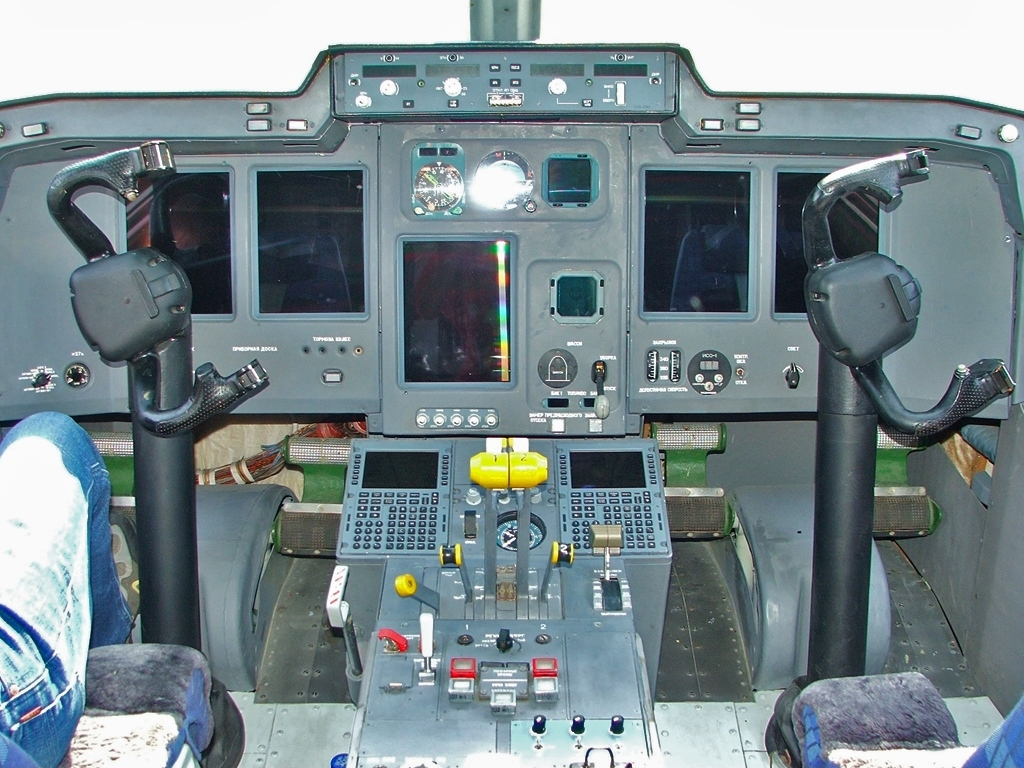
Cockpit view with Rockwell Collins avionics

=== Engines ===
During the original production run of the Il-114, powerplants from both Russian and Western suppliers were considered, both driving six-blade propellers from either Hamilton Sundstrand or Aerosila. Several aircraft delivered to Uzbekistan Airways were equipped with Pratt & Whitney Canada PW127H engines, designated the Il-114-100. The remaining produced aircraft were equipped with the Russian built Klimov TV7-117S and later the TV7-117SM engine. Following the resumption of production, new Il-114-300 aircraft will be equipped with the upgraded Klimov TV7-117ST-01 engine, as well as Aerosila TA-14 auxiliary power unit.

Ilyushin Il-114 engine variations

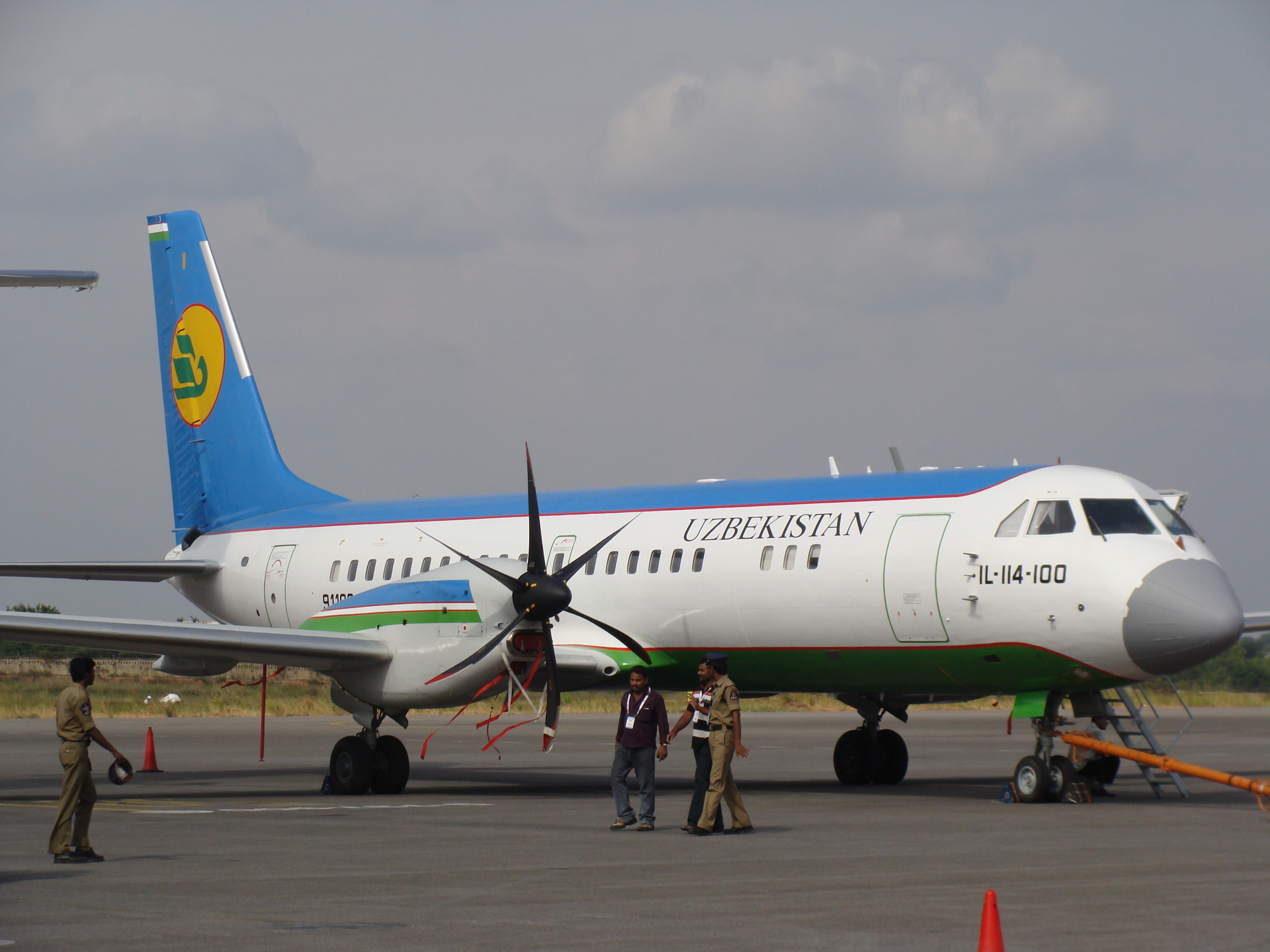
Pratt & Whitney Canada PW127H

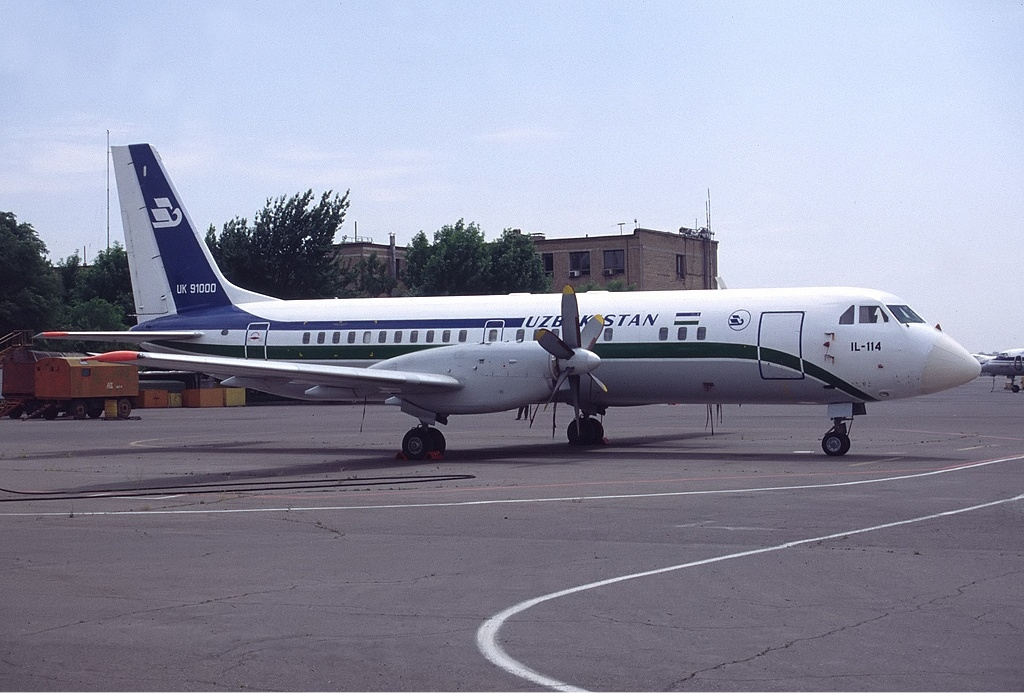
Klimov TV7-177S/SM

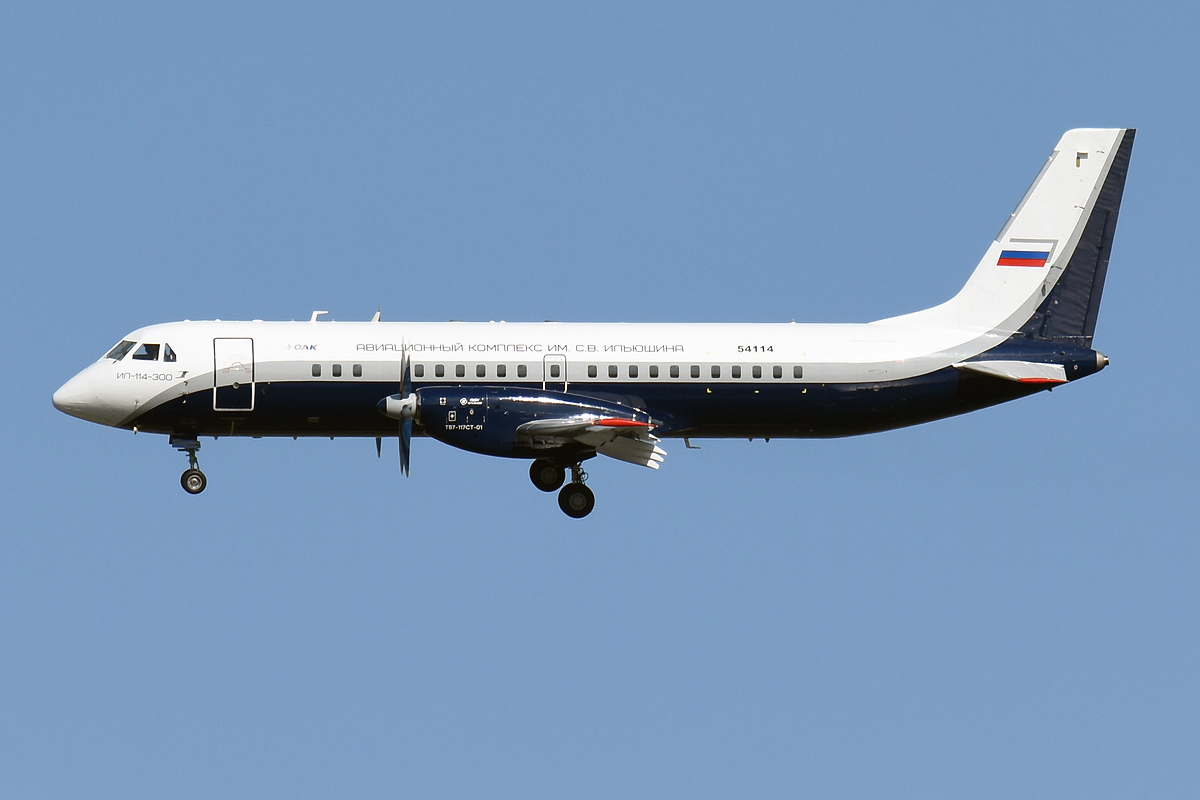
Klimov TV7-177ST-01

== Operational history ==
=== Original ===
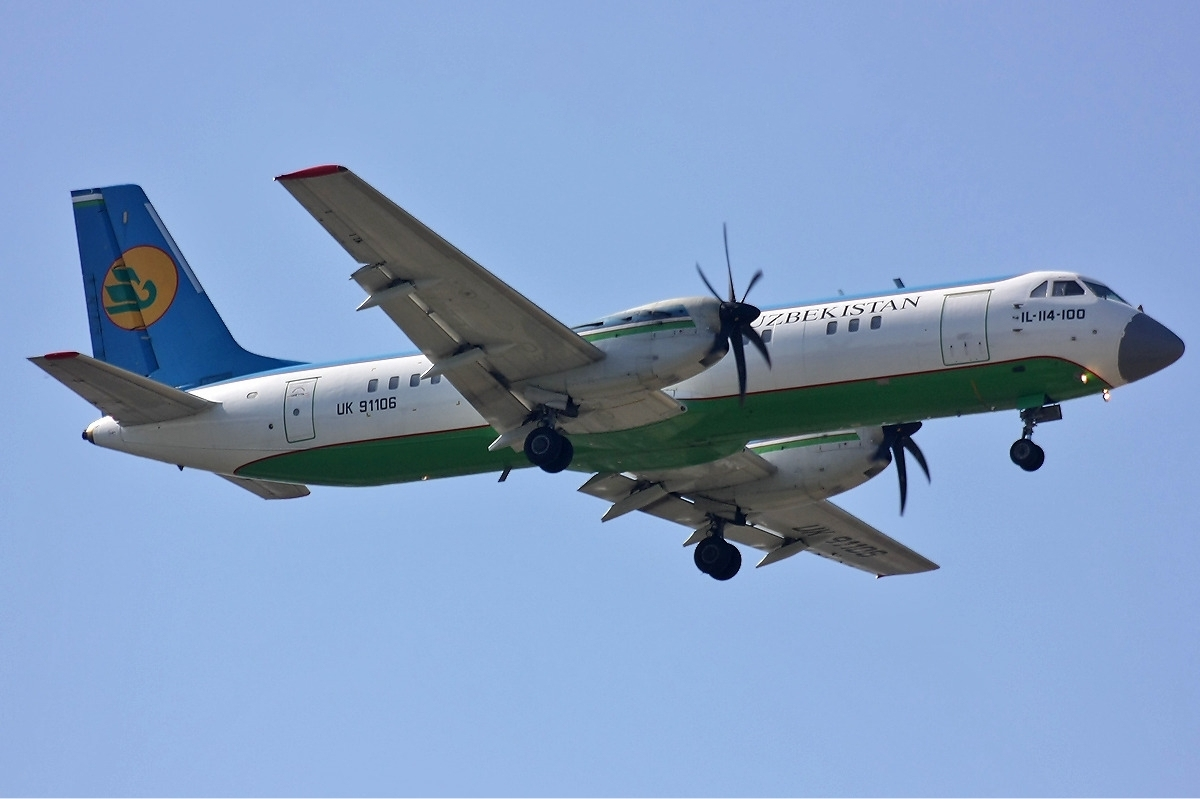
Uzbekistan Airways Ilyushin Il-114 at Dyubin 2012

Since Vyborg was forced to shut down in July 2010, Uzbekistan Airways was the sole operator of the type until May 2018. As of May 2018, no further orders had been placed for the Ilyushin 114.

In the winter of 2013–2014 the aircraft was scheduled for the following routes:

- Together with the Airbus A320 for flights between Tashkent and Karshi, Navoi, Nukus as well as Urgench.
- Together with the Boeing 757 for flights between Tashkent and Termez.
- Together with the Airbus A320 and the Boeing 757 for flights between Tashkent and Bukhara

Though the aircraft is not scheduled for other flights, following ad hoc changes it is also (though rarely) flown to other destinations in Uzbekistan. This also includes international connections: though these are no longer scheduled for the Ilyushin 114, the aircraft is sometimes used ad hoc on flights between Tashkent and Ashgabad as well as Bishkek. Uzbekistan Airways frequently changed aircraft prior to flights in order to allow for optimal usage of aircraft space in relation to actual demand.

=== Restart ===
In September 2026, United Aircraft Corporation reported that the first serial aircraft was scheduled for delivery by the end of 2026, with two more scheduled for January 2027. The launch customer of the type is the 2nd Arkhangelsk United Aviation Division based in Arkhangelsk. Deliveries to the far-eastern airline Aurora as well as the Indian company Flamingo Aerospace are planned in 2028. Six aircraft are planned for production in 2028, followed by nine in 2029 and 2023, before aiming to increase to twelve aircraft per year.

== Variants ==
- Il-114 – The first production model with TV7-117S engines and 64 passengers
- Il-114-100 – First flown on 26 January 1999 with PW-127H turboprops, 64 passengers.
- Il-114-300 – Truncated variant with two Klimov TV7-117SM engine. Fuselage is shorter, carrying 52–68 passengers.
- Il-114T – Cargo transport version, first flown on 14 September 1996. Delivered to Zhukovski for certification tests in March 2001. Two aircraft have been built by April 2001. Eight airframes were sitting at the TAPO plant as of May 2013.
- Il-114P – Maritime patrol version.
- Il-114MP – Maritime patrol/strike version.
- Il-114LL – Flying laboratory
- Il-114FK – Military reconnaissance, elint, photo builder or cartographic map version.
- Il-114PR – SIGINT/AEW
- Il-140 – AWACS
- Il-140M – maritime patrol, ecological monitoring, search and rescue.
- Il-140M Agat – Radar-MMS testbed – advanced-technology MPA demonstrator

== Operators ==
Current:

Russia

- Ilyushin Design Bureau

Former:

Russia

- Vyborg Airlines (2)

Uzbekistan

- Uzbekistan Airways (6)

=== Orders ===
Date	Airline	EIS	Orders	Options	Deliveries	Operated	Notes	References
18 November 2026	(Russia) Polar Airlines	2029–	6	—	—	—		
4 September 2019	(Russia) KrasAvia	TBD	3	—	—	—		
20 July 2021	(Russia) Aurora	TBD	19	—	—	—		
15 August 2021	(Russia) Vologda Air Enterprise	TBD	3	—	—	—		
28 January 2026	(India) Flamingo Aerospace	2028–	6	—	—	—		
14 April 2026	(Russia) 2nd Arkhangelsk United Aviation Division	2026–	3	—	—	—		
10 September 2026	(India) Pinnacle Air	TBD	50					
10 September 2026	(India) Sleek Aviation	TBD	35					
10 September 2026	(India) Air Kerala	TBD	20					
Total:			145	0	0	0		

== Accidents and incidents ==
=== Accidents ===
The aircraft involved in the crash on 5 July 1993

- On 5 July 1993, a prototype Il-114, registration RA-54001 crashed during a test flight at Ramenskoye Airport. Seven of the nine crew members were killed. A failure in the electronic control unit of the starboard TV7-117 engine resulted in it switching to feathering mode, resulting in a stall. Human factors were also identified as contributing to the accident. The crash resulted in delays to the aircraft program, and a pause in funding from the Russian government.
- On 5 December 1999, an Il-114T (Note: Cargo variant of the Il-114), registration UK-91004, operated by the Tashkent Aviation Production Association crashed on takeoff at Domodedovo Airport during a test flight. Of the seven occupants, five were killed, including two crew members and three passengers. The crash was attributed to pilot error, compounded by high winds resulting in a rudder hard-over event.

== Specifications ==
Il-114 specifications
Subtype	Il-114	Il-114-100	Il-114-300
Crew	2		
Capacity	64		68
Length	26.88 m (88 ft 2 in)		26.9 m (88 ft 3 in)
Height	9.19 m (30 ft 2 in)		9.05 m (29 ft 8 in)
Wingspan	30.0 m (98 ft 5 in)		29.87 m (98 ft 0 in)
Wing area	81.90 m^{2} (881.6 sq ft)		
Aspect ratio	11		
Width	2.86 m (9 ft 5 in)		
Max takeoff weight	23,500 kg (51,800 lb)		
Operating empty	15,000 kg (33,000 lb)		13,700 kg (30,200 lb)
Max payload	6,500 kg (14,300 lb)		6,800 kg (15,000 lb)
Max fuel	8,360 L (1,840 imp gal) (2,210 US gal)		8,780 L (1,930 imp gal) (2,319 US gal)
Engines (×2)	TV7-117S	PW127H	TV7-117ST-01
Unit power	1,839 kW (2,466 hp)		2,160 kW (2,900 hp)
Max speed	500 km/h (270 kn)		
High speed cruise	470 km/h (250 kn)		450 km/h (240 kn)
Ceiling	8,000 m (26,000 ft)		7,600 m (24,900 ft)
Range (Max pax)	1,000 km (540 nmi)		1,400 km (760 nmi)
Takeoff	1,400 m (4,600 ft)		750 m (2,460 ft)
Landing	900 m (3,000 ft)		550 m (1,800 ft)

== See also ==
Related development

- CASA 3000
- TVRS-44

Aircraft of comparable role, configuration, and era

- Antonov An-24/Xian Y-7/Xian MA60
- ATR 72
- British Aerospace ATP
- De Havilland Canada Dash 8
- Fokker 50
- Saab 2000
- Xian MA700
- HAL/NAL Regional Transport Aircraft
- Indonesian Aerospace N-245
- IPTN N-250

Related lists

- List of aircraft
- List of civil aircraft

== Sources ==
- Duffy, Paul (October 1997). "Ilyushin's New Turboprop Freighter: The Il-114T". Air International. Vol. 53, no. 4. pp. 242–244. ISSN 0306-5634.
- Gordon, Yefim; Komissarov, Dmitriy; Komissarov, Sergey (2004). OKB Ilyushin: A History of the Design Bureau and its Aircraft. Hinckley, UK: Midland Publishing. ISBN 978-1-85780-187-3.
- Jackson, Paul (2003). Jane's All The World's Aircraft 2003–2004. Coulsdon, UK: Jane's Information Group. ISBN 978-0-7106-2537-3.
- Postlethwaite, Alan (5–11 September 1990). "Commuter from Khodinka". Flight International. Vol. 138, no. 4232. pp. 100–104, 107. ISSN 0015-3710.
- Postlethwaite, Alan (13 May 1989). "Ilyushin's New Workhorse". Flight International. Vol. 135, no. 4164. pp. 29–31. ISSN 0015-3710.
