= Usolsky District, Perm Krai =

Usolsky District Усольский район (Russian)
- District
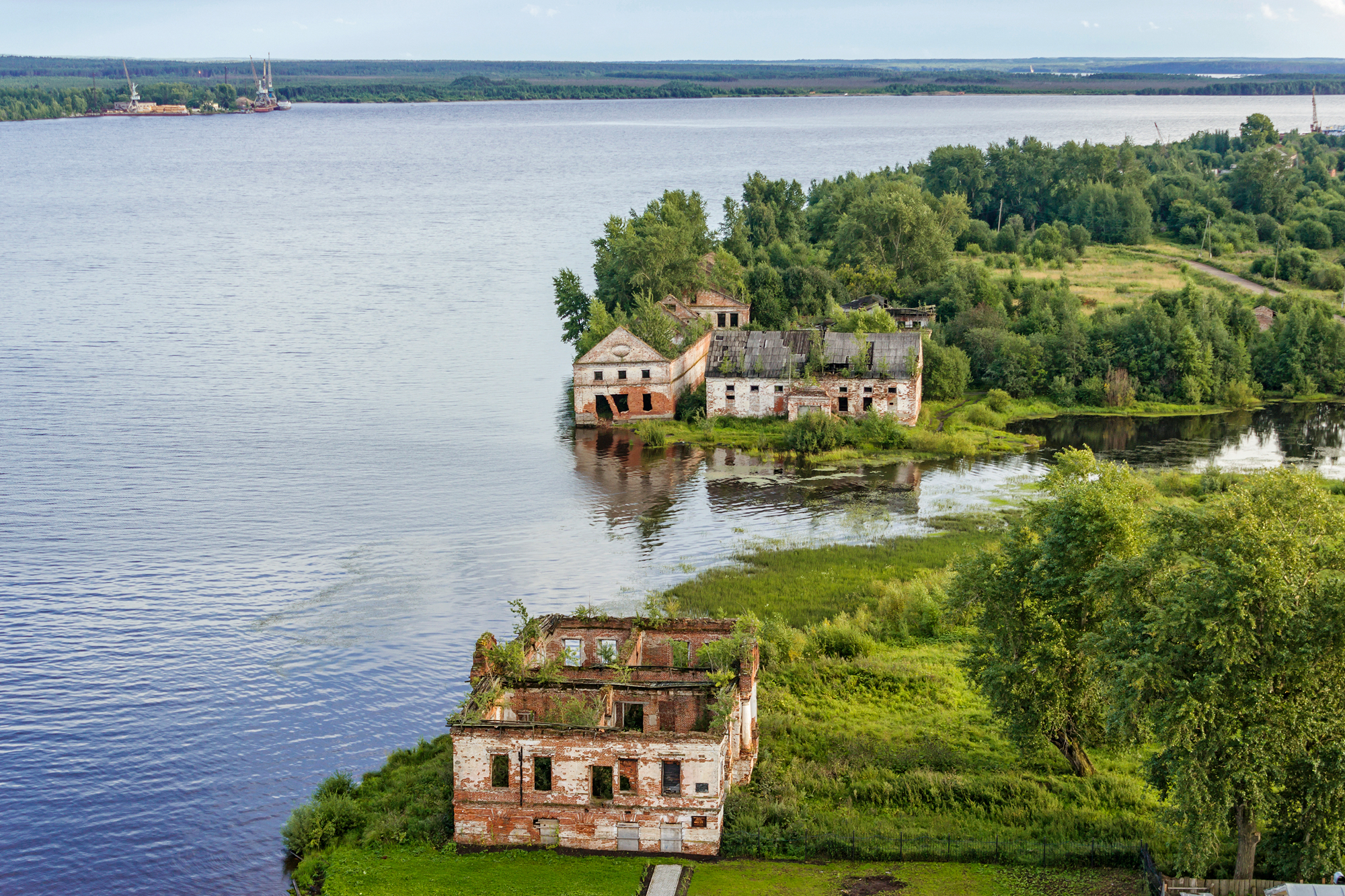
- Old houses, Usolsky District

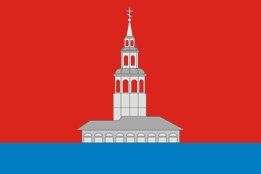
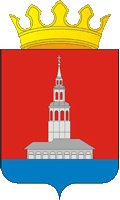
- Flag Coat of arms
- Location of Usolsky District in Perm Krai
- Coordinates: 59.369°N 55.748°E
- Country: Russia
- Federal subject: Perm Krai
- Established: August 1940
- Administrative center: Usolye

Area
  - Total: 4,666 km^{2} (1,802 sq mi)

Population (2010 Census)
  - Total: 14,232
  - Density: 3.050/km^{2} (7.900/sq mi)
  - Urban: 40.0%
  - Rural: 60.0%

Administrative structure
  - Inhabited localities: 1 cities/towns, 73 rural localities

Municipal structure
  - Municipally incorporated as: Usolsky Municipal District
  - Municipal divisions: 1 urban settlements, 3 rural settlements

Usolsky District (Russian: Усо́льский райо́н) is an administrative district (raion) of Perm Krai, Russia; one of the thirty-three in the krai. As a municipal division, it is incorporated as Usolsky Municipal District. It is located in the center of the krai. The area of the district is 4,666 square kilometers (1,802 sq mi). Its administrative center is the town of Usolye. Population: 14,232 (2010 census); 13,398 (2002 census); 16,265 (1989 Soviet census). The population of Usolye accounts for 40.0% of the district's total population.

== Geography ==
About 70% of the district's territory is covered by forests, mostly coniferous.

== History ==
The district was established in August 1940 as Voroshilovsky District. Present name was given to it in 1957.

== Demographics ==
Ethnic composition (according to the 2002 Census):

- Russians: 93.8%
- Komi-Permyak people: 1.7%
- Tatars: 1.4%

== Economy ==
The economy of the district is based on forestry and timber industry, production of furniture, and agriculture.

== Notable residents ==
- Vasily Boryagin (1919–1998), fitter and production-rationalizer, Honored citizen of Berezniki, Hero of Socialist Labor, born in Lenva
- Andrey Voronikhin (1759–1814), architect and painter, born in Novoe Usolye
