= Wings India =

Biennial air show held in Hyderabad, India

- Genre: Air show
- Dates: January
- Frequency: Biennial: Even years
- Venue: Begumpet Airport
- Locations: Hyderabad, Telangana
- Country: India
- Established: 2008; 18 years ago
- Most recent: 2026
- Next event: 2028
- Organiser: Union civil aviation ministry
- Website: wings-india.co.in

Wings India (formerly the Indian Civil Aviation Airshow) is a biennial air show held in Hyderabad, Telangana, India at the Begumpet Airport. The first show, India Aviation 2008, was held from 15 to 18 October 2008. It is organised by the Union civil aviation ministry. Begumpet is preparing to receive the world's largest passenger aircraft after the place was closed for regular commercial operations and is now used only for private, defence and VVIP aircraft ever since the new Rajiv Gandhi International Airport at Shamshabad, Hyderabad became operational. Hyderabad will be a permanent venue for this Airshow.

The show includes both air displays and static exhibitions of various Civil and Military aircraft, along with displays from vendors, suppliers and production organisations. The aircraft, which were on static or flying display, include Boeing 777, Airbus A340, Canadian Regional Jet of Bombardier Citation, business jets manufactured by various global leaders, Bell Helicopters, DragonFly, Cessna, Indian-made Pushpak and Indian firm Hindavia's Russian-made regional aircraft Ilyushin Il-114. This is apart from the world's largest passenger aircraft, the Airbus A380, which made its maiden and historic landing at Hyderabad's Begumpet Airport on 16 October 2008.

The show was unveiled by Union Minister for Civil Aviation Mr. Praful Patel. Top honchos of the aviation industry from India and abroad were a part of the event, including Air India CMD Raghu Menon, Kingfisher Airlines chief Vijay Mallya, former US FAA Administrator Marion C Blakey, AAI chief K Ramalingam, EADS CEO Yves Guillame, GoAir MD Jehangir Wadia, Air Arabia CEO Adel Ali and top-brass of various airport operators, engine, avionics and aircraft manufacturers like Boeing, Airbus, Bombardier and Bell Helicopters.

While the show is meant only for business visitors who are invited, other business visitors (above 18 years) can also visit the show by purchasing an entry ticket. The last day of the 2008 show was open to public. The show was a sort of partnership between FICCI and AAI to jointly organise it for the overall sustainable development of the civil aviation in the country.
