= Aerosila =

OJSC "SPE "Aerosila"
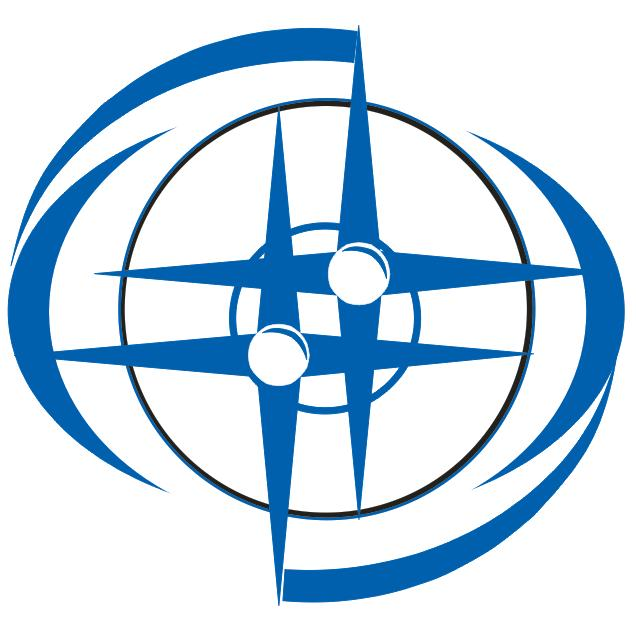
- Industry: aerospace
- Founded: 1939
- Headquarters: Stupino, Russia
- Products: aircraft propeller, APU
- Number of employees: 934

SPE "Aerosila" (Russian: Аэросила) is the leading Russian firm in the field of development and manufacturing of aircraft propellers, propfans, auxiliary gas-turbine engines as well as aviation aggregates of different purpose including hydromechanical rotation frequency governors of propellers and power ballscrew mechanisms with integrated gearboxes for aircraft with a wing variable sweep, oil-pumps, air regulators, fans and others.

Since 1956 the enterprise started creation of auxiliary gas-turbine engines for APU. For a short period the enterprise has developed and put into operation the family of TA for the aircraft Tu-154, Tu-154M, Tu-134A, Tu-144, Tu-160, Tu-22M, Tu-204, Il-62, Il-62M, Il-76, Il-76MD, Yak-42, An-22, An-124, An-74, An-70, A-40, and the helicopter Mi-26. Since the 2010s, the company has been working on developing new auxiliary power units (APU) for the aircraft Yakovlev MC-21 and Beriev A-100

== Leadership ==
- Zhdanov, Konstantin Ivanovich (1939–1972)
- Polyakov, Anatoly Mikhailovich (1972–1984)
- Sukhorosov, Yuri Leonidovich (1984–2002)
- Sukhorosov, Sergey Yuryevich (2002 – unknown)
- Tochilin, Pavel Gennadyevich (present)
