= Berezniki =

City in Perm Krai, Russia

Berezniki Березники
- City
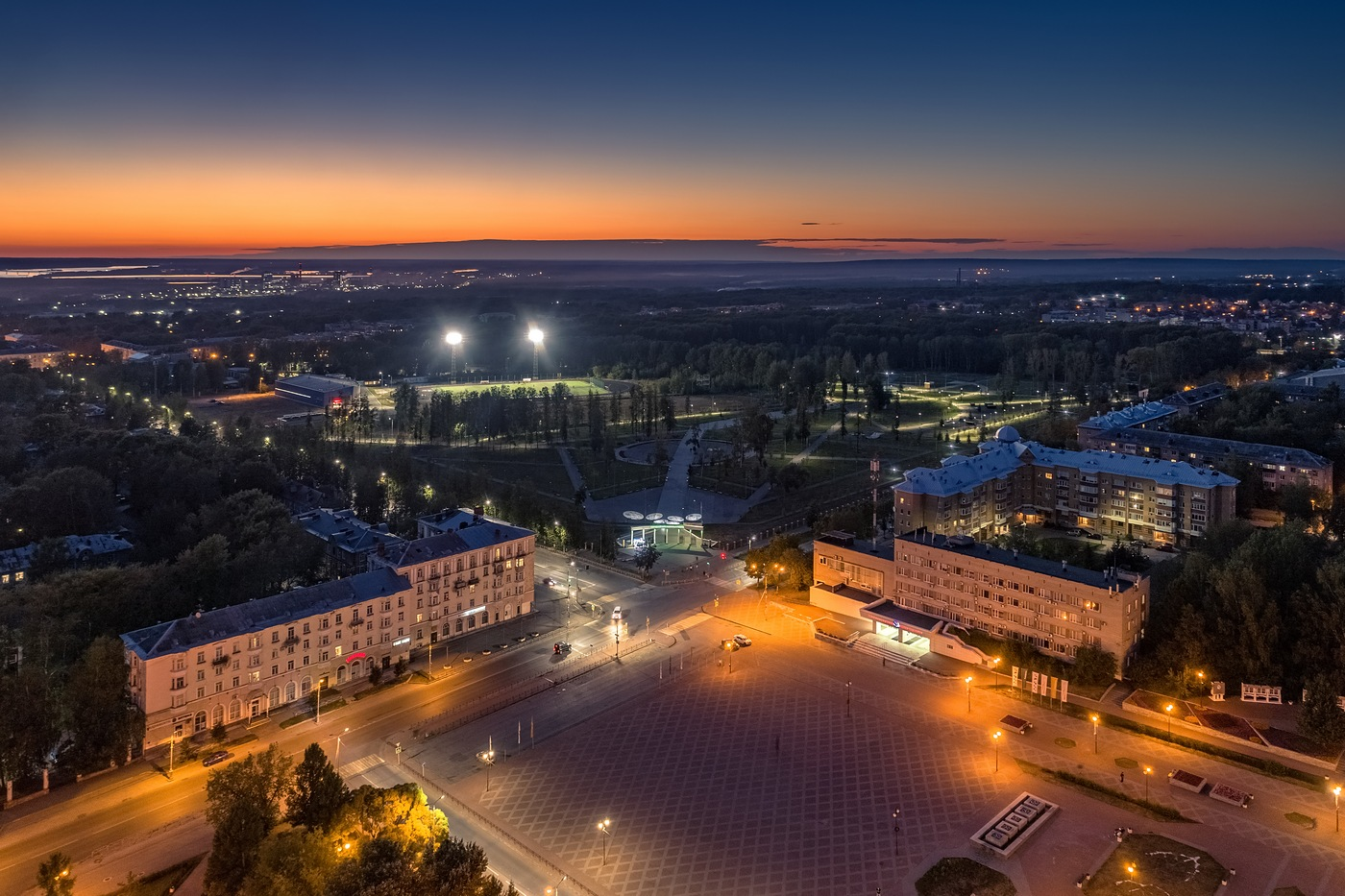
- Berezniki City Administration building and central square

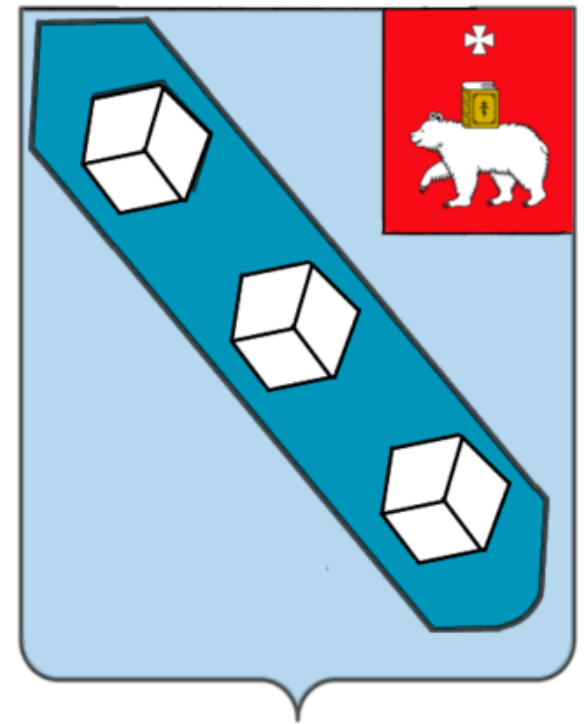
- Flag Coat of arms
- Interactive map of Berezniki
- Location of Berezniki Berezniki (Perm Krai)
- Coordinates: 59°25′N 56°47′E
- Country: Russia
- Federal subject: Perm Krai
- Founded: 1873
- City status since: 1932

Government
  - Body: City Duma
  - Head: Alexey Kazachenko
- Elevation: 130 m (430 ft)

Population (2010 Census)
  - Total: 156,466
  - Estimate (2025): 132,841 (−15.1%)
  - Rank: 112th in 2010

Administrative status
  - Subordinated to: city of krai significance of Berezniki
  - Capital of: city of krai significance of Berezniki

Municipal status
  - Urban okrug: Berezniki Urban Okrug
  - Capital of: Berezniki Urban Okrug
- Time zone: UTC+5 (MSK+2)
- Postal code: 618400-618426
- Dialing code: +7 3424
- OKTMO ID: 57708000001
- Website: admbrk.ru

Berezniki (Russian: Березники́; Komi-Permyak: Кыдззакар; Kydźzakar) is the second-largest city in Perm Krai, Russia. The city is located on the banks of the Kama River, in the Ural Mountains with a population of 132,841 as of 2025.

== Etymology ==
The name Berezniki is derived from a birch forest originally situated in the city's location.

== History ==
The first Russian settlements in the city appeared in the 16th - 17th century on the basis of salt mines.

It was founded in 1873. City status was granted to it in 1932 as its industry was rapidly expanding under Joseph Stalin.

== Administrative and municipal status ==
Within the framework of administrative divisions, it is incorporated as the city of krai significance of Berezniki—an administrative unit with the status equal to that of the districts. As a municipal division, the city of krai significance of Berezniki is incorporated as Berezniki Urban Okrug.

== Economy ==
After the dissolution of the Soviet Union in 1991, the city's population dropped due to increased unemployment. Nevertheless, the city was able to keep its main industries on track. Large chemical plants such as titanium and sodium factories as well as several huge potassium, magnesium and potash mines are operational in Berezniki.

The potash mine, owned by Uralkali, was the basis of the fortune of Dmitry Rybolovlev who sold his interest in 2010 to Suleyman Kerimov. Mine supports in the huge underground mine, about 1,000 feet (~300 metres) beneath the city, consist of soluble salt which is being dissolved by water flooding into the mine. The city, a former Soviet-era labor camp, was built near the work site, over the mine. Several sinkholes, some huge, have opened within the city. The situation requires round-the-clock monitoring. The problem is believed to be limited to a small part of the mine which was not filled properly and is limited in its future impact, but the relocation of the city is under consideration. The largest sinkhole, locally dubbed, "The Grandfather" by 2012, was 340 yards (~310 metres) wide, 430 yards (~390 metres) long, and 780 feet (~240 metres) deep. When it opened in 2007 the hole was initially 80 m long, 40 m wide and 200 m deep. The sinkhole was expected to expand, and destroy part of the only rail line which leads to and from the potash mines, and, being that Berezniki produces around 10% of the world's potash, this would lead global demand towards Canada, potentially damaging the local economy. Nobody was injured when the sinkhole appeared.

== Culture ==
Berezniki has a theatre and a museum of regional history.

Every year from 17 to 20 July the town celebrates its mosquitoes. They have music, dancing and a "most delicious girl" competition. In the competition, the girls stand for 20 minutes in their shorts and vests, and the one who receives the most bites wins.

== Population ==
Historical population
Year	Pop.	±%
1939	64,609	—
1959	106,119	+64.2%
1979	185,395	+74.7%
2000	181,900	−1.9%
2011	156,500	−14.0%
2015	148,955	−4.8%
2021	137,091	−8.0%
2025	132,841	−3.1%
Source: 1939, 1959, 1979, 2000, 2011, 2015, 2021, 2025

The city was in 124th place out of 1115 cities of Russia in terms of population in 2019.

According to the 2010 census, Russians formed a majority in the city with a 90.87%, while Tatars (3.16%) were the largest minority, followed by Ukrainians (0.81%), Permian Komi (0.67%) and Germans (0.51%).

== Transportation ==
Berezniki was served by the Berezniki Airport until 2001. A railway station is closed since it is located in the sinkhole area and has been damaged beyond repair. In the city, public transport service is operated with trolleybuses and buses.

== Notable people ==
- Vasily Pavlovich Boryagin, Hero of Socialist Labor
- Dmitry Rybolovlev, Russian billionaire, controlled the leading Berezniki potash mines from 2000 — 2011
- Boris Yeltsin, Russia's first president, attended Pushkin High School in Berezniki

== Gallery ==
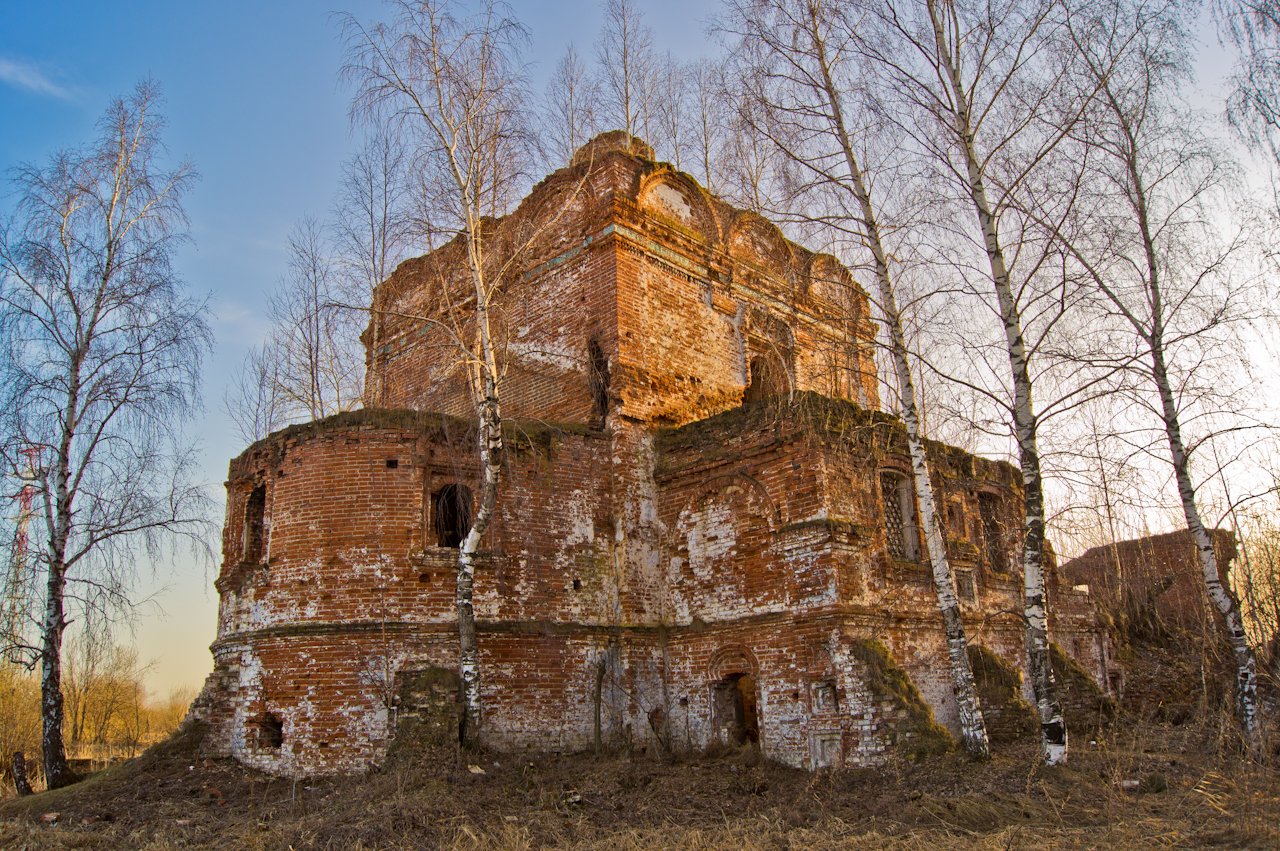
Trinity Church

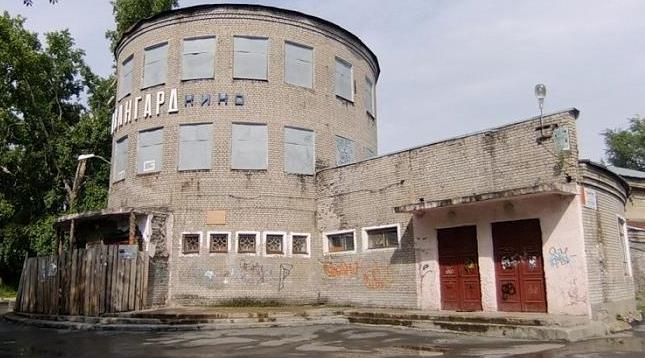
Cinema Avangard

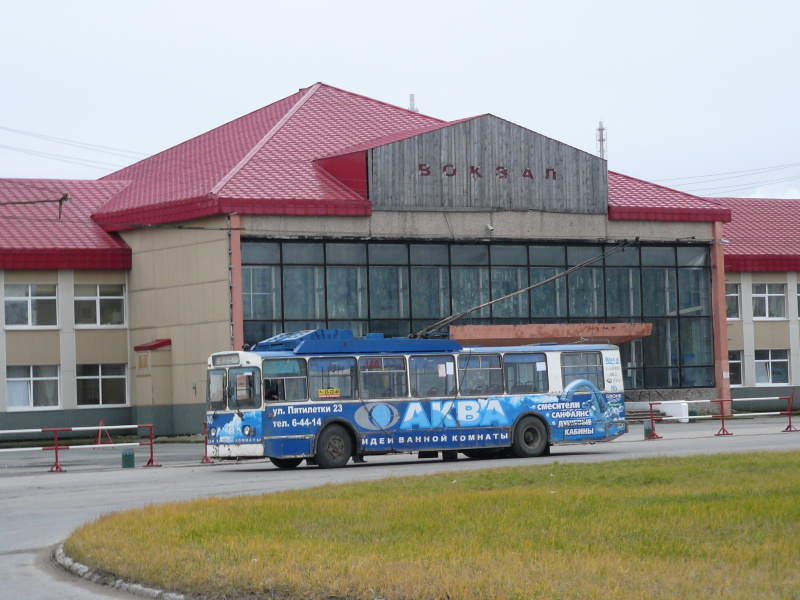
BTZ trolleybus and railway station in Berezniki

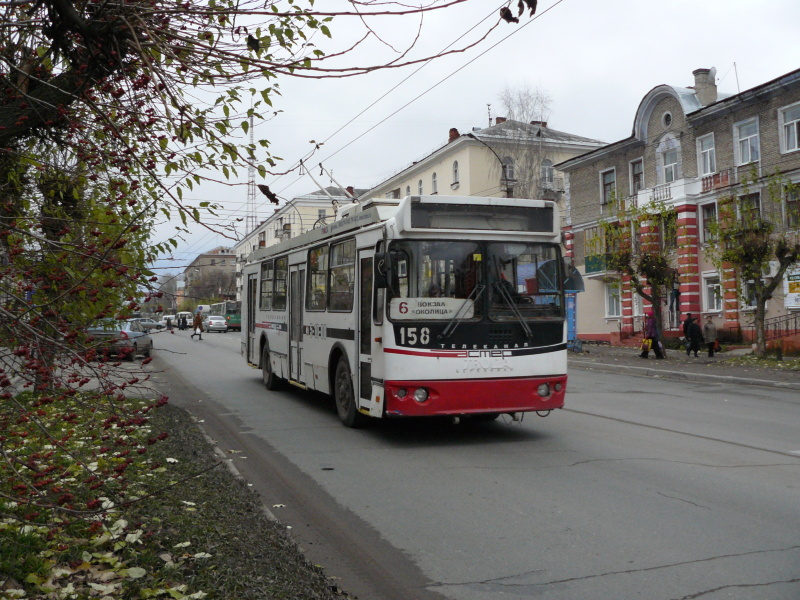
Trolza trolleybus in Berezniki

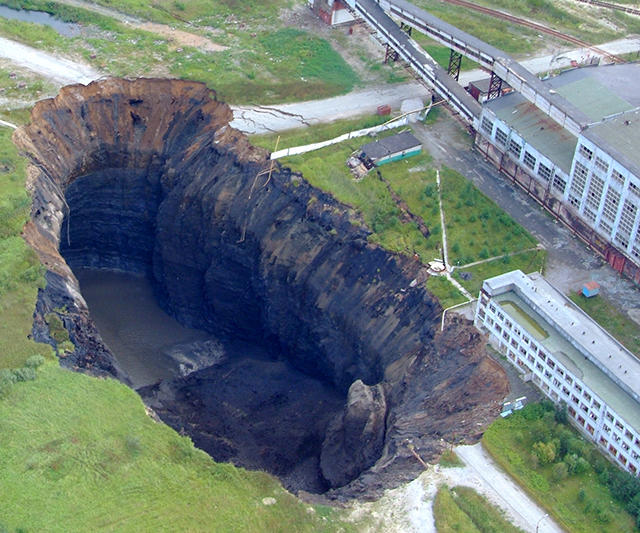
A sinkhole in Berezniki at the site of the first potash plant

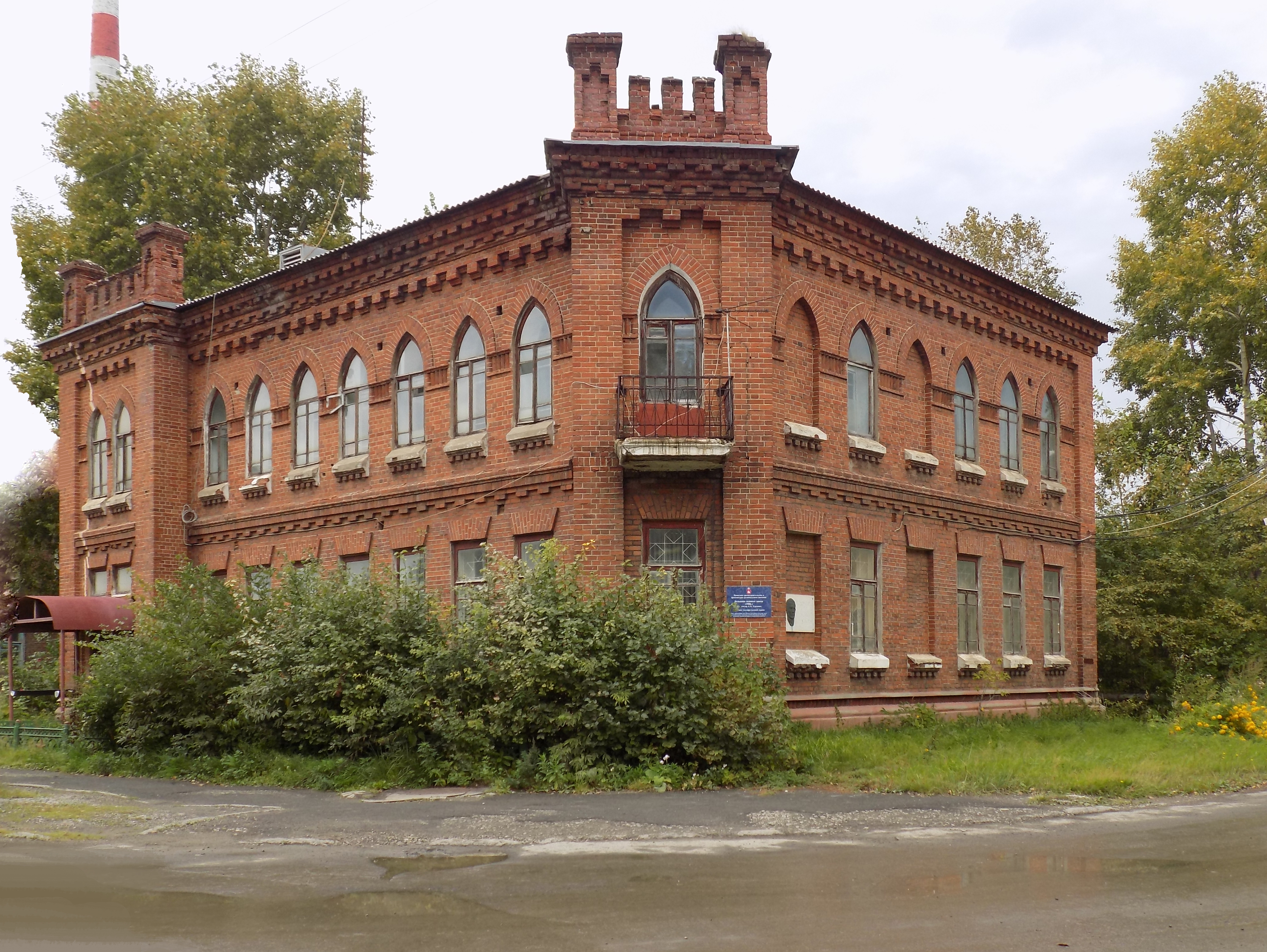
Hospital of a factory
