= Ural Works of Civil Aviation =

Russian aircraft manufacturer

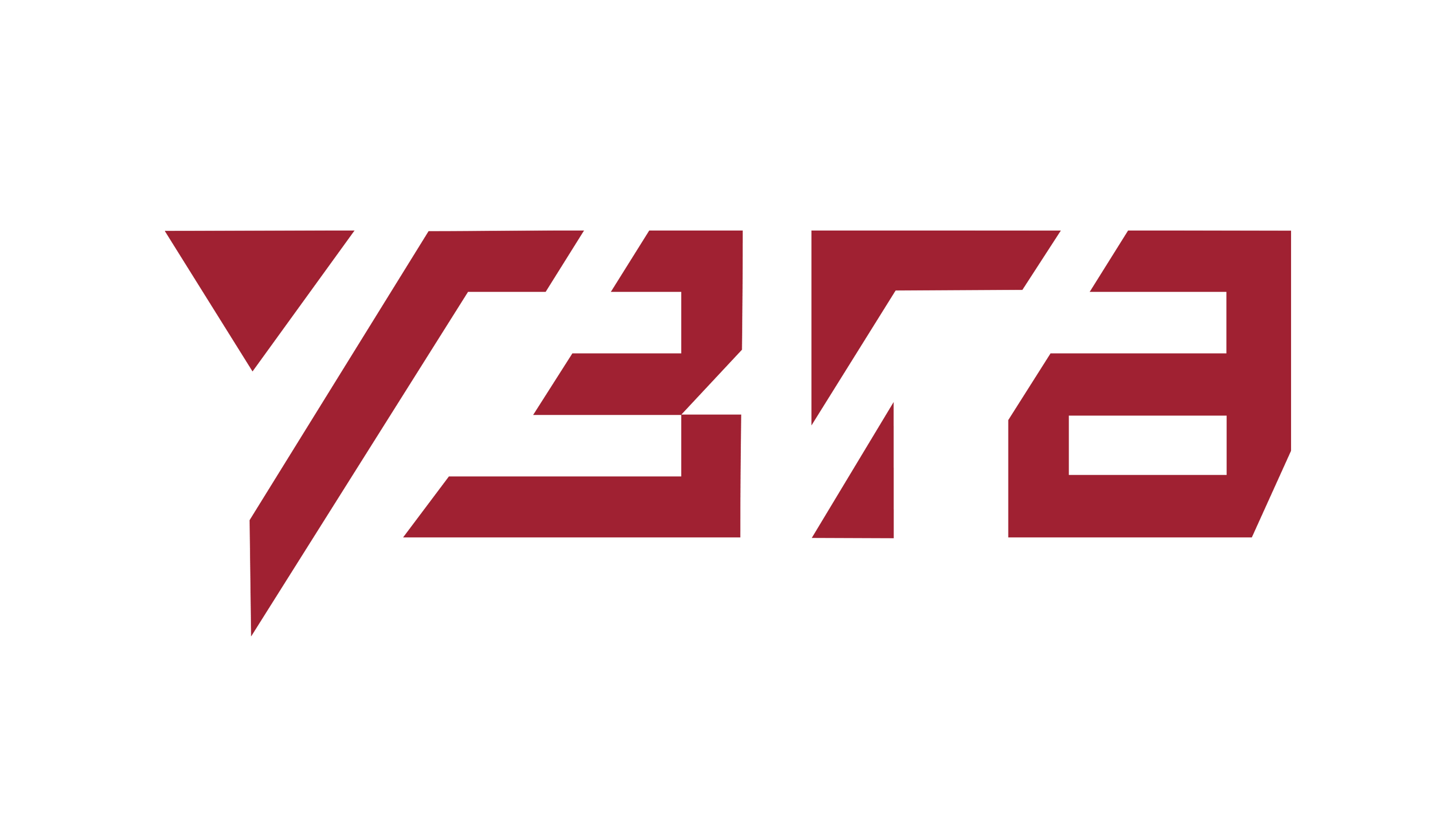
- Native name: Уральский завод гражданской авиации
- Industry: Aircraft industry
- Founded: 1939; 87 years ago
- Headquarters: Yekaterinburg, Sverdlovsk Oblast, Russia
- Products: Civil aviation
- Parent: Technodinamika (Rostec)
- Website: https://www.uwca.ru/en/

Ural Works of Civil Aviation (UZGA; Russian: Уральский завод гражданской авиации, also earlier Factory No. 404) is an aircraft manufacturing and aircraft repair enterprise, one of the major manufacturers in the aircraft manufacturing industry in Russia. It specializes in the development, production, testing, repair and maintenance of aircraft equipment, components and assemblies. The company includes a production center for engine maintenance and repair, aircraft manufacturing facilities, an engineering center, and a number of subsidiaries, affiliates, and separate companies.

== History ==
The history of the plant dates back to 1939: it began with linear aircraft repair shops (SARM GVF), which carried out maintenance of aircraft moving along the Moscow-Irkutsk, Sverdlovsk-Moscow and Moscow-Magnitogorsk air routes. On March 16, 1939, the workshops were given the status of an independent enterprise of the USSR civil fleet. This date became the birthday of plant No. 404, now known to us as the Ural Works of Civil Aviation.

The plant's activities began with the repair of U-2, Po-2 aircraft and M-11, M-17, MG-31 aircraft engines; during the Great Patriotic War, the enterprise significantly increased its production capacity. The plant mastered and began assembling SB bombers and I-15 and I-16 fighters, replacing engines on Li-2 aircraft and repairing the most popular engine at that time - ASh-62IR. According to wartime statistics, per shift the company produced up to 135 parts for the Katyusha MLRS. In total, in 1941–1945, the plant repaired and returned to service a record amount of equipment - 560 aircraft and 1,500 engines. During the war, the average repair and assembly rate was 214% of civilian time. During the war years, the staff of Plant No. 404 won six times in the socialist competition of Aeroflot repair enterprises.

After the war, the company mastered the repair of ASh-82FN engines used on IL-12 aircraft for the civil air fleet. To fulfill the required volume - 8 thousand units - the enterprise team developed a new technology - a repair production line, unique in the civil aviation industry. The experience of the Ural innovators was subsequently implemented at other enterprises.

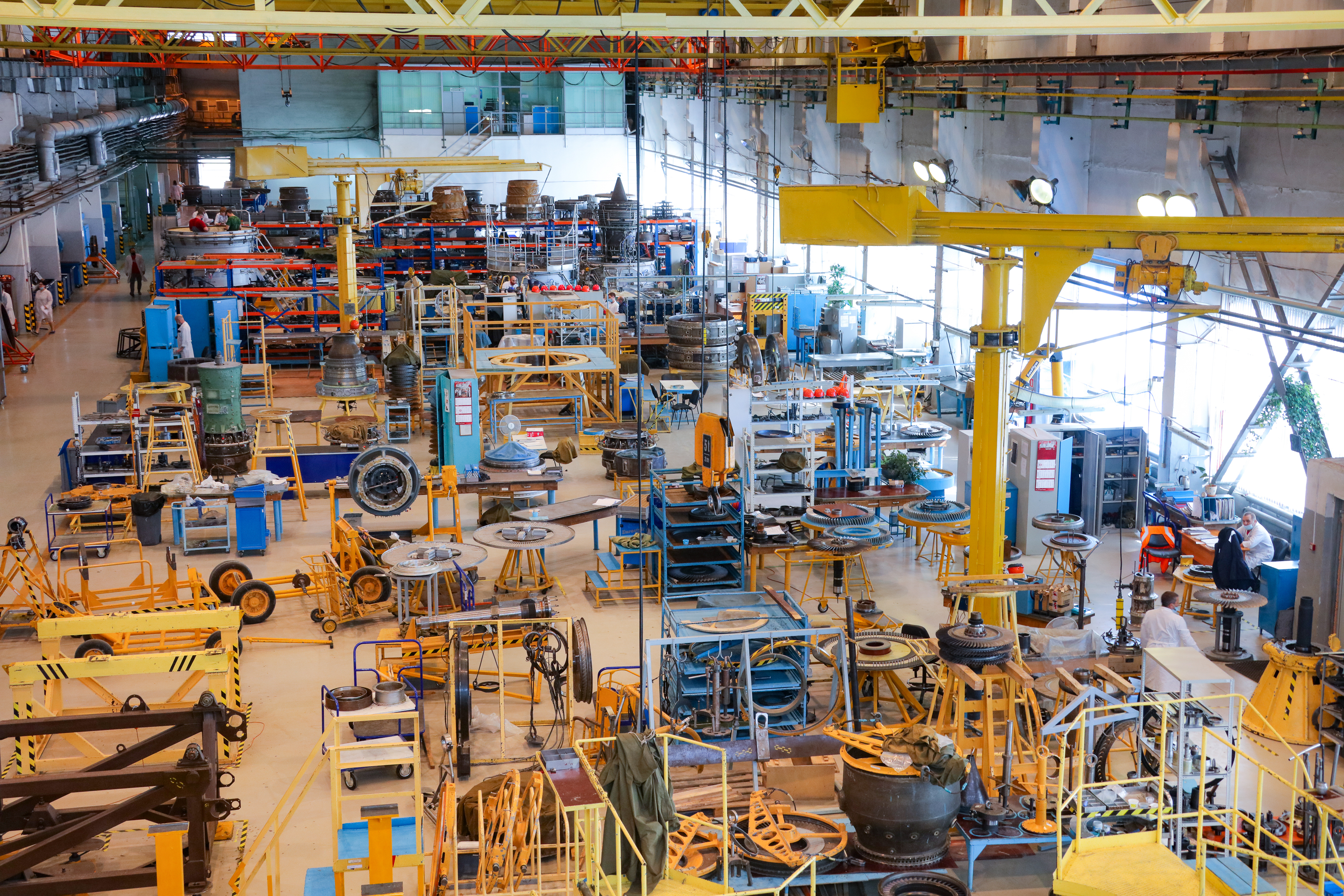
Repair shop of the Ural Civil Aviation Plant

In 1956, after the reorganization and technical equipment of the workshops, the company mastered the repair of ASh-82T piston engines for IL-14 aircraft.

In the 1960s, along with the development of helicopter aviation, a need arose for a major overhaul of the ASh-82V engines and the R-5 main gearbox of the Mi-4 helicopters. Until 1987, this task was carried out by employees of the Ural plant, who restored 15 thousand engines and 8 thousand gearboxes during this period.

In 1981, the plant was awarded the Order of the Badge of Honor by the Decree of the Presidium of the Supreme Soviet of the USSR. The main achievements of the 1980s were the opening of a structural analysis laboratory to monitor the structure of turbine blades for overheating using electron microscopes; completion of the construction of the MIS-2 engine testing station and the first launch of the NK-8-2 engine at the stand.

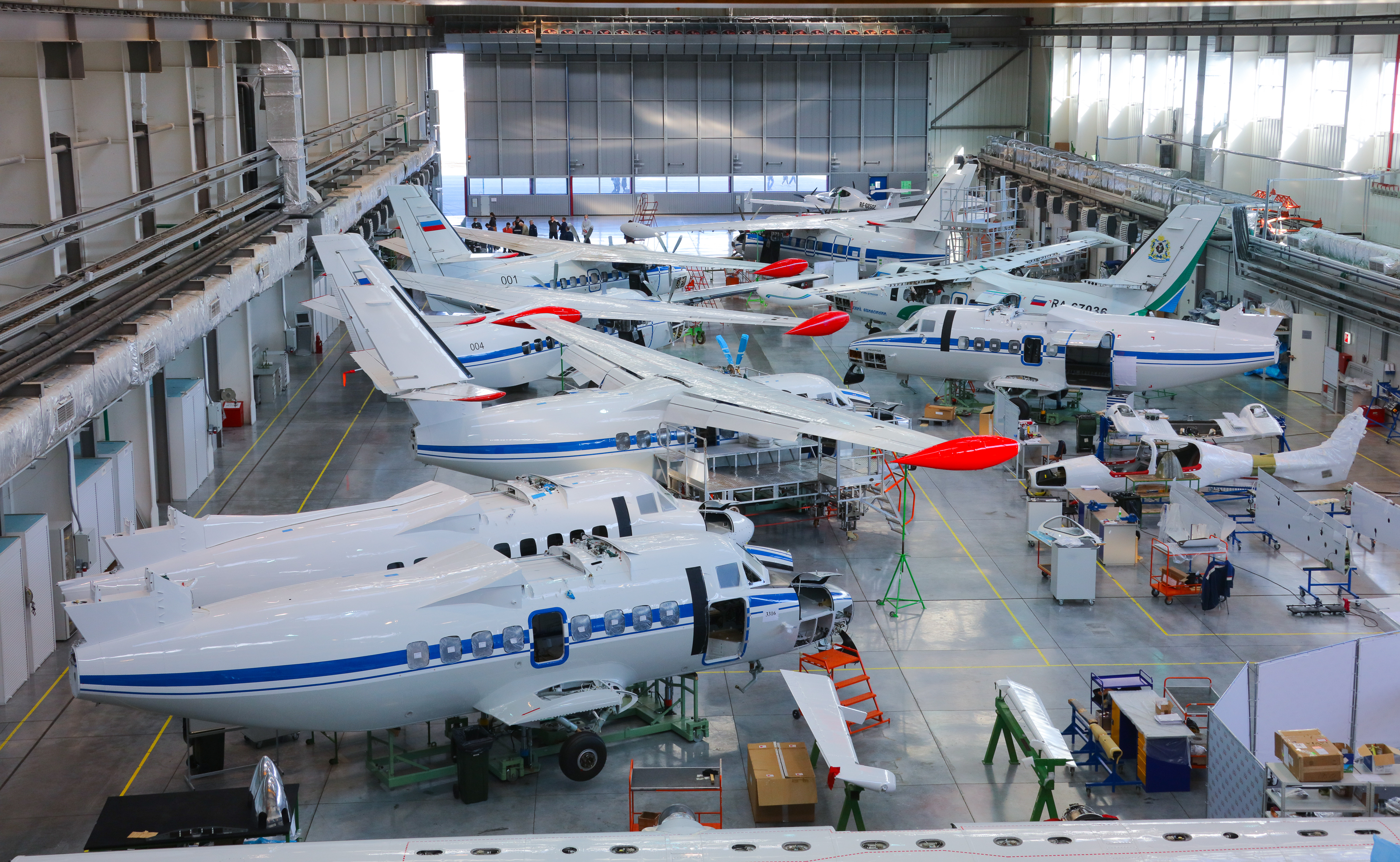
Aircraft assembly shop of the Ural Civil Aviation Plant at the Uktus airfield

In the 1990s, UZGA began overhauling more modern TV3-117 helicopter engines and their modifications, and was the first enterprise in Russia to master the technology for repairing the GTD-350 engine for Mi-2 helicopters.

In 2003, was repairing AI-9V engines, and in 2007, the first repair of the NK-12ST engine for gas compressor units was carried out. In 2013 the plant started the production of Diamond light aircraft. In 2015, the plant became the official representative of Textron Aviation in the Russian Federation and produced Bell-407 from the American manufacturer Bell Helicopter Textron.

== Aircraft development and production ==
Ural Works of Civil Aviation will manufacture both the 9-seat single-engine turboprop local airliner LMS-901 "Baikal" and 44-seat twin-engine turboprop regional airliner TVRS-44 "Ladoga".

The development of the LMS-901 aircraft started in 2019. The first flight took place on January 30, 2022.

Due to the sanctions of the European Union, the production of L-410 aircraft has been discontinued since 2022.

For 2022 420 different aircraft have been assembled at the plant for all time.

=== LMS-192 ===
LMS-192

In May 2024, Russia's latest civil aircraft manufacturing forecast featured the LMS-192 Osvey, a 19-seat high-wing commuter aircraft, powered by twin Klimov VK-800 turboprops. A partnership between UZGA and the Belarusian 558 Aviation Repair Plant plan a production of 20 airframes in 2027, then 46 in following years for 158 to be built by the end of the decade.

== Aircraft ==
Aircraft	Category	Remarks
Aircraft Industries L-410 NG	Regional airliner	Licensed production. Production concluded in 2021 due to lack of demand.
Aircraft Industries L-610	Regional airliner	Licensed production. Development terminated. Project evolved into the TVRS-44 Ladoga.
Bell 407	Utility helicopter	Licensed production.
Diamond DA40	Light aircraft	Licensed production.
Diamond DA42	Light aircraft	Licensed production.
UZGA LMS-9	Utility aircraft	Development terminated. Project evolved into the LMS-192 Osvey.
UZGA LMS-19	Utility aircraft	Development terminated. Project evolved into the LMS-192 Osvey.
UZGA LMS-192 Osvey	Utility aircraft	Utility aircraft using two Klimov K-800 turboprop engines. Developed in cooperation with Diamond Aircraft and the 558th Aircraft Repair Plant in Belarus. Flight testing planned in 2025.
UZGA LMS-901 Baikal	Utility aircraft	Utility aircraft using the Klimov K-800 turboprop engine designed by Baikal Engineering. Undergoing flight testing using the General Electric H80 while in development.
UZGA TVRS-44 Ladoga	Regional airliner	Regional airliner powered by two Klimov TV7-117 engines. Flight testing planned in 2025.
UZGA UTS-800	Trainer aircraft	Localised variant of the Diamond DART using the Klimov VK-800 turboprop engine. To supplement the Yakovlev Yak-130 lead-in-fighter trainer. Undergoing flight testing using the General Electric H80 while in development.
IAI UZGA Forpost	Reconnaissance UAV / Unmanned Combat Aerial Vehicle	Licensed copy of the Israeli IAI Searcher reconnaissance drone. Production continues as the Forpost-R and Forpost-RE variants which replace Israeli systems with domestic Russian components.
Sokol UZGA Altius	Reconnaissance UAV / Unmanned Combat Aerial Vehicle	Serial production variant of the heavy unmanned combat aerial vehicle designed by OKB Sokol.

== Sanctions ==
The plant has been under EU, US Canadian and Australian sanctions.

== See also ==
- Titanium Valley
- Aircraft industry of Russia
