= TVRS-44 =

Russian regional airliner

TVRS-44 "Ladoga"
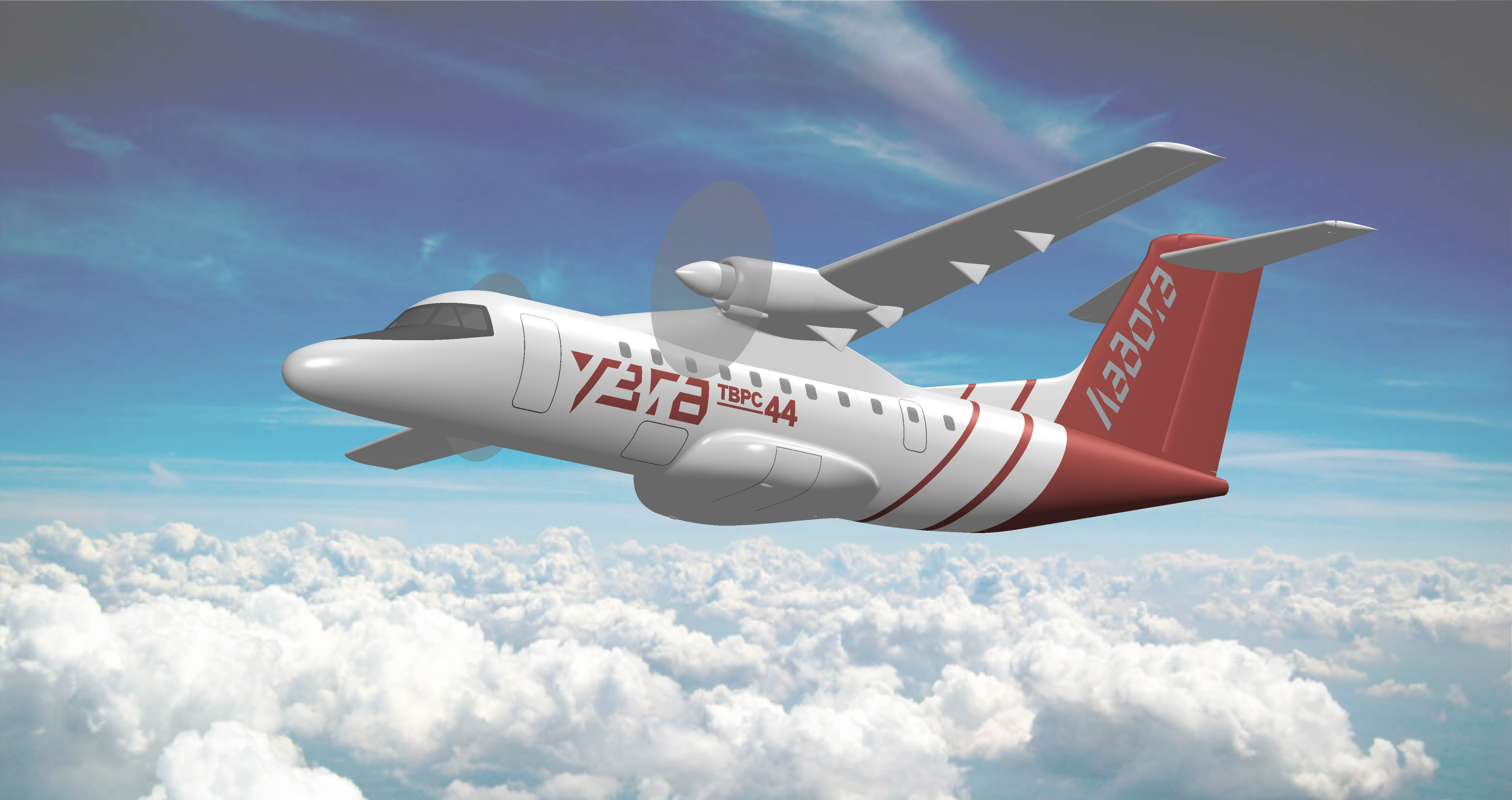
- Model of TVRS-44

General information
- Type: regional airliner
- National origin: Russia
- Manufacturer: Aviakor
- Designer: UZGA

TVRS-44 Ladoga (Russian: Турбовинтовой Региональный Самолёт на 44 пассажира; Turboprop Regional Airplane for 44 passengers) is a proposed Russian twin-engine turboprop passenger aircraft that would be used for local airlines.

Developed by UZGA (Ural Works of Civil Aviation), the aircraft would in theory be produced the "Aviakor" aircraft plant in the industrial city of Samara. The "Ladoga" is intended to replace Russia's largely aging fleet of regional aircraft, with a capacity of 30 to 50 passengers, such as the An-24, An-26, An-140 and Yak-40. It is designed for use on unprepared dirt, grass and snow runways, as well as on airfields with a short runway. TVRS-44 would in theory occupy a niche between the 19-seat L-410 and the 64-seat Il-114-300.

Flight testing is planned for 2024–2025.

== History ==
The first (pre-contract) work on this project began in December 2018 at UZGA. The Let L-610 was used as a model. On September 2, 2020, the Ministry of Industry and Trade approved the technical specifications for work on “Development of a turboprop regional aircraft” (TVRS), which consolidated the requirements for a local airline aircraft for 44–48 passengers. In the same year, the chief designer of the project, Sergei Merenkov, confirmed that the L-610 was only an inspiration for the TVRS, and two planes will be completely different. On December 25, 2020, a State contract was signed between the Ministry of Industry and Trade of Russia and UZGA. The estimated cost of one aircraft for 2021, according to UZGA calculations, was about $12 million. Cooperation for the production of elements and aggregates includes cities such as Taganrog, Komsomolsk-on-Amur, Nizhny Novgorod, Samara and Smolensk.

On March 9, 2022, the project was officially given the name “Ladoga”. In April 2022, TsAGI specialists, commissioned by UZGA, summed up the interim results of tests of the TVRS-44 aircraft in the wind tunnel in terms of aerodynamic characteristics. In March 2022, a contract was signed, according to which the Samara aircraft plant Aviakor (which previously produced the An-140) became the contractor for the serial construction of the TVRS-44 aircraft. As of April 2022, the development work at UZGA was underway, taking into account the groundwork available for the L-610 aircraft, which was developed in Czechoslovakia at the order of the USSR. The chief designer for the TVRS-44 project is Sergei Merenkov.

In August 2022, UZGA demonstrated at the Army-2022 forum a model of the cargo version of the TVRS-44 Ladoga aircraft – TVRS-44T. As with the passenger version, it is planned to use two TV7-117ST-02 turboprop engines with AV-44 propellers. The distinctive features of the cargo version are: a fuselage extended by 4 meters and a cargo hatch with a ramp in the rear section.

To reduce design time, a number of Russian-made parts and aggregates were used from other serially produced and in production aircraft: cockpit canopy and conical windshields (from An-74 and An-140), main landing gear (from An-72/An-74), front strut (from Su-80GP). Pilot seats (An-140/An-148).

In January 2023, it became known that at the Dubna complex at TsAGI, a series of emergency splashdown tests and a series of ejection tests of a dynamically similar model of the Ladoga aircraft were completed, which consisted of more than 100 launches with different initial parameters. Also in January, it was announced that the United Engine Corporation (UEC) will supply four experimental TV7-117ST-02 engines for preliminary tests, including as part of the aircraft: two in the summer of 2023 and two at the end of the year.

Flight tests are planned to be carried out in 2024–2025, when the TV7-117ST engine will be completed. First commercial deliveries to airlines are planned for 2027.

In March 2025 the first fuselage of TVRS-44 was delivered from Aviakor factory to UZGA for final assembly. After the assembly of the prototype by the end of 2025 it will undergo ground and flight testing.

According to the comprehensive program for the development of the Russian air transport industry adopted by order of the Government of the Russian Federation at the end of June 2022, it is planned to build 140 TVRS-44 Ladoga passenger aircraft in 2025–2030.

== Design ==
The aircraft was designed according to a traditional design with an all-metal prefabricated riveted airframe structure with a high wing. The flaps, spoilers, nose cone and fuselage tip, wing connection with the fuselage and the fairing of the main landing gear are made of composite material. Also, parts of the passenger compartment will be made from composite materials: cabin floors, overhead luggage racks and interior lining. The rudders and ailerons are expected to be of a conservative design.

=== Fuselage ===
TVRS-44 is designed with a high wing, improving reliable operation from rural unpaved runways. TVRS-44 differs from L-610 in that the fuselage is extended by one metre, and its floor width has been increased from 2020 mm to 2250 mm. Also, the front location of the entrance door-stairway was used instead of the rear one. Wing fuel tanks are almost doubled. The maximum take-off weight increased from 15,100 kg to 17,000 kg.

=== Propulsion ===
In July 2021, it became known that the St. Petersburg enterprise ODK-Klimov received technical specifications for the creation of a power unit (PS) for the TVRS-44 based on the TV7-117ST-01 engines, previously developed for the Il-114-300 aircraft. The engine received the designation TV7-117ST-02. Two such engines with a power of 2400 hp each are installed on the aircraft. There are some improvements from the basic version like an electric start instead of air start, as well as updated wiring and electrical system. In addition, the engine mounts are designed to be suitable for underwing mounting. A number of other smaller design changes were also introduced to make fuel consumption more economical than the initial design.

It is planned to use a new composite propeller designated AV-44. It was developed by Aerosila based on the design of the AV-112-114 (Il-114) propeller with blades similar to the SV-34 (An-140) propeller. The diameter of the propeller is 3.6 m.

== See also ==
Related development

- Antonov An-140
- Ilyushin Il-114

Aircraft of comparable role, configuration, and era

- ATR 42
- Dornier 328
- Indonesian Aerospace N-245

Related lists

- List of aircraft
- List of civil aircraft
