= Ivchenko-Progress AI-450S =

2010s Ukrainian turboprop aircraft engine

AI-450S
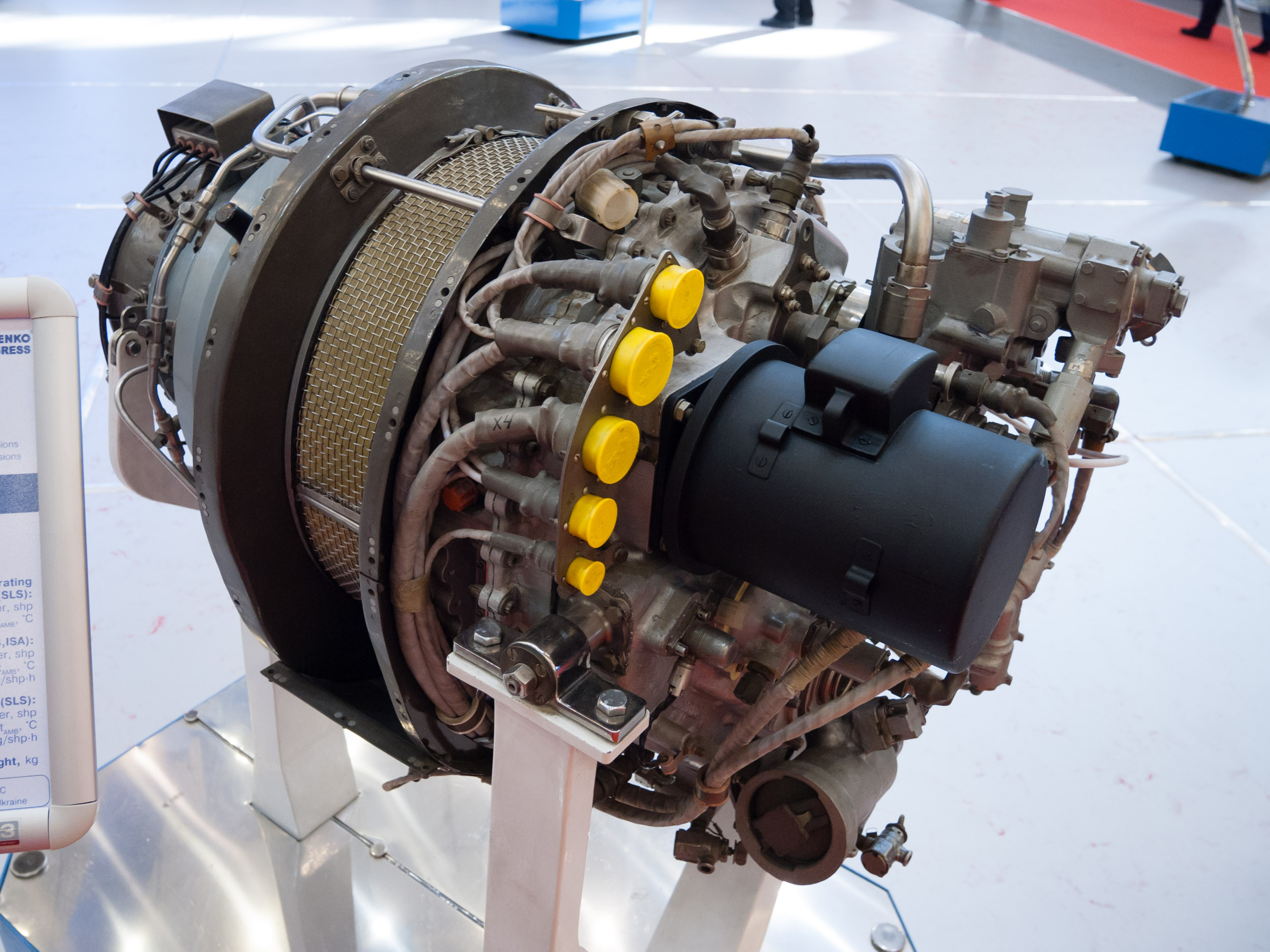
- Zbroya ta Bezpeka military fair, Kyiv, Ukraine, 2018
- Type: Turboprop
- National origin: Ukraine
- Manufacturer: Ivchenko-Progress
- Major applications: Diamond DA50-JP7; Evektor EV-55; Diamond Dart 450; Bayraktar Akıncı

The Ivchenko-Progress AI-450S is a turboprop engine designed by Ivchenko-Progress and built by Motor Sich. It is a two-shaft design with one gas generator shaft and one free turbine shaft. The 450 hp AI-450S is used on the Diamond DA50-JP7, Bayraktar Akıncı UAV and Diamond Dart 450 and the 630 hp AI-450S-2 is used on the Evektor EV-55. The price of an AI-450 engine is roughly $236,400.

== Specification ==
model	AI-450S	AI-450S-2
Dimensions	1,108 х 575 х 702 mm	1,120 х 578 х 700 mm
Weight, dry	130 kg (290 lb)	140 kg (310 lb)
Take-off power	340 kW (450 hp)	470 kW (630 hp)
Cruise power	210 kW (280 hp)	406 kW (544 hp)
Take-off fuel consumption	375 g/kW/h (0.616 lb/hp/h)	347 g/kW/h (0.570 lb/hp/h)
Cruise fuel consumption	375 g/kW/h (0.616 lb/hp/h)	330 g/kW/h (0.54 lb/hp/h)
Power-to-weight at take-off	2.62 kW/kg (1.59 hp/lb)	3.36 kW/kg (2.04 hp/lb)

== See also ==
Comparable engines

- Pratt & Whitney Canada PT6
- Rolls-Royce 250

Related lists

- List of aircraft engines
