= LMS-9/19 =

- LMS-19 project

General information
- Type: light regional airliner
- National origin: Austrian and Russian
- Manufacturer: Diamond Aircraft / Rostec via Oboronprom

History
- Introduction date: was to be introduced in 2016
- First flight: was planned for 2015

The LMS-9 and LMS-19 (Russian: Легкие многоцелевые самолеты - ЛМС, Lightweight multifunctional airplanes) are light airliners projected by Austrian Diamond Aircraft and Russian Rostec via Oboronprom subsidiary Ural Works of Civil Aviation based in Yekaterinburg.

== Development ==
At the June 2013 Paris Air Show, they agreed to develop a 19 seater composite airframe. At the August 2013 MAKS Air Show, it was priced at Rb120 million ($3.62 million) along a Rb80 million ($2.41 million) nine-seater, with scale models on display. In November, first flight was planned for 2015.

Aircraft design process should be completed in 2014, to proceed to aircraft testing before production in 2017-2018. With a 9.4 billion rubles cost estimate, Rostec is committing 383 million rubles within 2 bln secured, leaving a 8 bln need. In 2013-2016, 5 billion rubles will be leveraged from the Russian National Wealth Fund for research and development, transfer of technologies, new factory creation and type certification. In 2016-2017, 3 billion rubles from the federal budget of Russia will fund certification completion, initial required equipment acquisition and aircraft maintenance and repair system creation. In 2016-2018 900 million rubles will be needed to achieve the design capacity. Rostec plan to sell for 51.4 billion rubles by 2025 (excluding VAT) for a 16.235 billion rubles accumulated profit - a 32% return on sales, and to supply 800 aircraft by 2030, after the 10.39 years discounted payback period.

== Design ==
The aircraft should be powered by efficient, turbocharged diesel aircraft engines burning jet fuel to be introduced in 2016. In Russia, a modern and affordable light airplane is lacking: more than 200 are needed to replace the obsolete fleet and Rostec plans to create an aircraft lease program. Initially the aircraft and engines will be assembled in Austria, then components will be produced in Russia before all the airplane components and engines. In service An-2 and L-410 have low fuel efficiency and high operating costs. The new aircraft family could operate in arctic conditions, attach skids landing gear for snow or pontoons for water. Both will benefit from 80% commonality. They will employ cabin pressurization.

Russian Prime Minister Dmitry Medvedev mentioned its pivotal use of composite materials. Fuselage length differs through extension plugs with the longer variant having a large aft door, and both share a common wing, nose and empennage. Also involved are RT-Khimkomposit (Chemical Composites) and TsAGI (the Central Aerohydrodynamics Institute), having tested MC-21 wing boxes. Similar out of autoclave infusion methods will reduce costs of monocoque structures over a large production run. Limited ground handling is needed and low-pressure tires enable operations from unpaved soil/ or grass runways.

== Specifications ==
LMS-9 project

Rostec specifications
Variant	LMS-9	LMS-19
Passengers	9	19
Cabin – Luggage volume		14.5–4.04 m^{3} (512–143 cu ft)
MTOW – Empty weight	3,500–2,100 kg (7,700–4,600 lb)	6,400–3,900 kg (14,100–8,600 lb)
Maximum payload	1,400 kg (3,100 lb)	2,500 kg (5,500 lb)
Fuel capacity	900 kg (2,000 lb)	1,160 kg (2,560 lb)
Engines	2× 280 kg (620 lb) V8	2× 375 kg (827 lb) V12
Power	2× 450 hp (340 kW)	2× 750 hp (560 kW)
Engine TBO	2000 h	
Min. cruise fuel burn	<90 kg (200 lb)/h	<140 kg (310 lb)/h
Fuel burn/pax	<23.0 g/km	< 19.0 g/km
Max. cruise	440 km/h (240 kn)	
range : full fuel – 93kg/pax – max. PL (Note: 185km alternate + 45min hold)	3,500–2,000–1,500 km 1,890–1,080–810 nmi	2,850–1,620–860 km 1,540–870–460 nmi
Take-off – run	470–305 m (1,542–1,001 ft)	540–350 m (1,770–1,150 ft)
Landing – run	560–295 m (1,837–968 ft)	675–340 m (2,215–1,115 ft)
climb rate – 1 eng.	11.9–2.9 m/s (2,340–570 ft/min)	9.6–2.4 m/s (1,890–470 ft/min)
Ceiling	8,200 m (26,900 ft)	
Lift/drag ratio	>20 (cruise)	
Life	>100,000 hours / flight cycles	
Operating cost	<10,000RUB/h	
Production cost	47.92 mn RUB	73.36 mn RUB
