= Walter M602 =

1980s Czech turboprop aircraft engine

M602
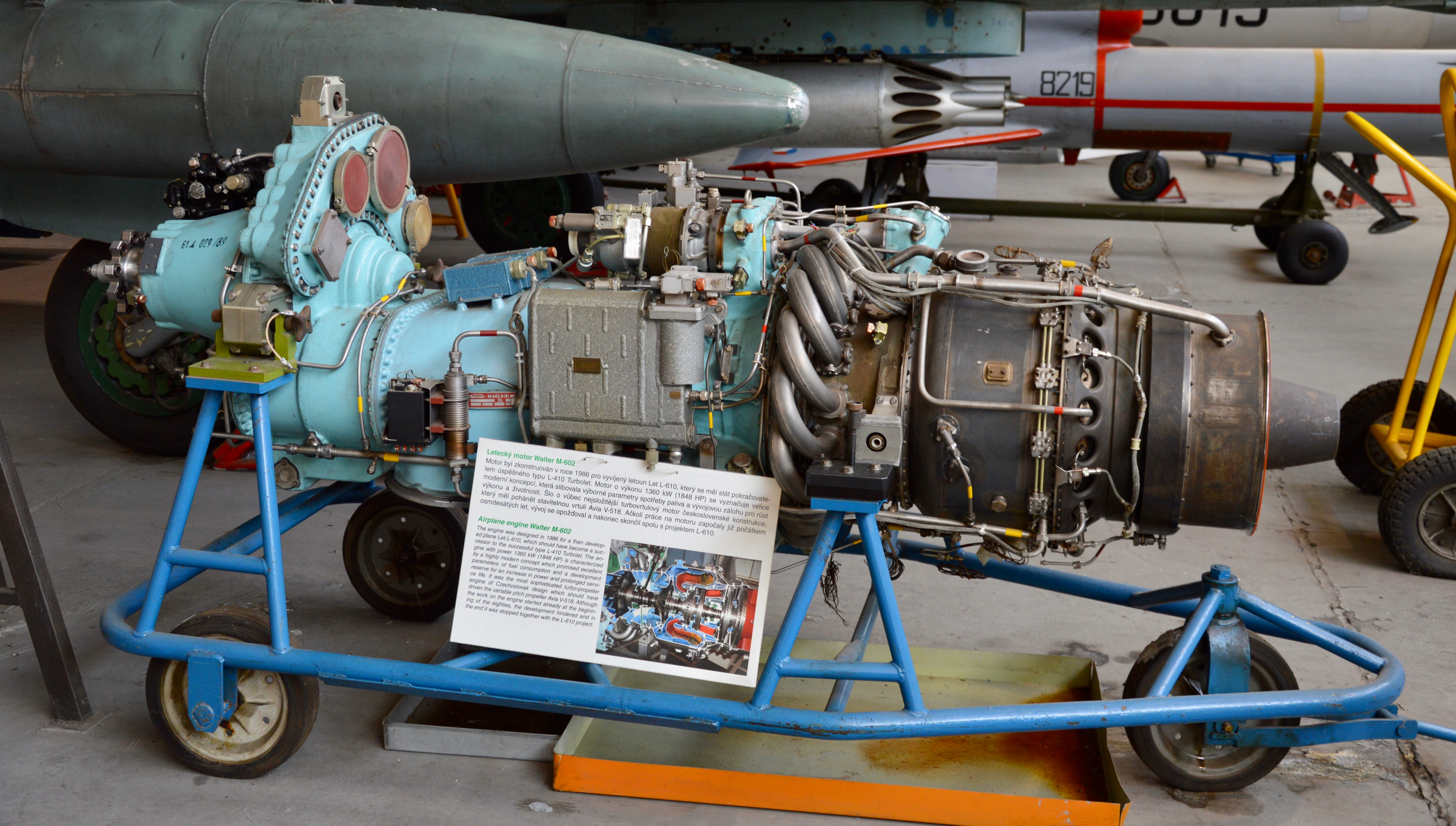
- M602 on display at the Kbely Aviation Museum
- Type: Turboprop
- National origin: Czechoslovakia
- Manufacturer: Walter Aircraft Engines
- First run: 25 February 1986
- Major applications: Let L-610

The Walter M602 is a turboprop aircraft engine produced by Walter Aircraft Engines of the Czechoslovakia, used on the Let L-610.

== Applications ==
- Let L-610

== Specification ==
Data from Jane's All the World's Aircraft 2005–2006

==== General characteristics ====
- Type: Three-spool turboprop engine
- Length: 2565 mm (M602A), 2285 mm (M602B)
- Diameter: 753 mm
- Dry weight: 570 kg (M602A), 480 kg (M602B)

==== Components ====
- Compressor: 2-spool centrifugal compressor
- Combustors: Annular combustion chamber
- Turbine: 1-stage HP axial turbine (with internally cooled blades), 1-stage axial IP compressor, 2-stage LP axial power turbine
- Fuel type: Aviation kerosene
- Oil system: pressure spray

==== Performance ====
- Maximum power output: 1,360 kW (1,820 hp) (M602A), maximum continuous 1,200 kW (1,600 hp), 1,500 kW (2,000 hp) (M602B)
- Overall pressure ratio: 12
- Air mass flow: 7.33 kg/s (970 lb/min)
- Turbine inlet temperature: 1388K
- Fuel consumption: 0.330 kg/kWh (0.543 lb/(hp⋅h))
- Power-to-weight ratio: 2.39 kW/kg (M602A), 3.13 kW/kg (M602B)

== See also ==
Related lists

- List of aircraft engines
