= Diamond DART series =

Two-seat training aircraft from Austria

DART series
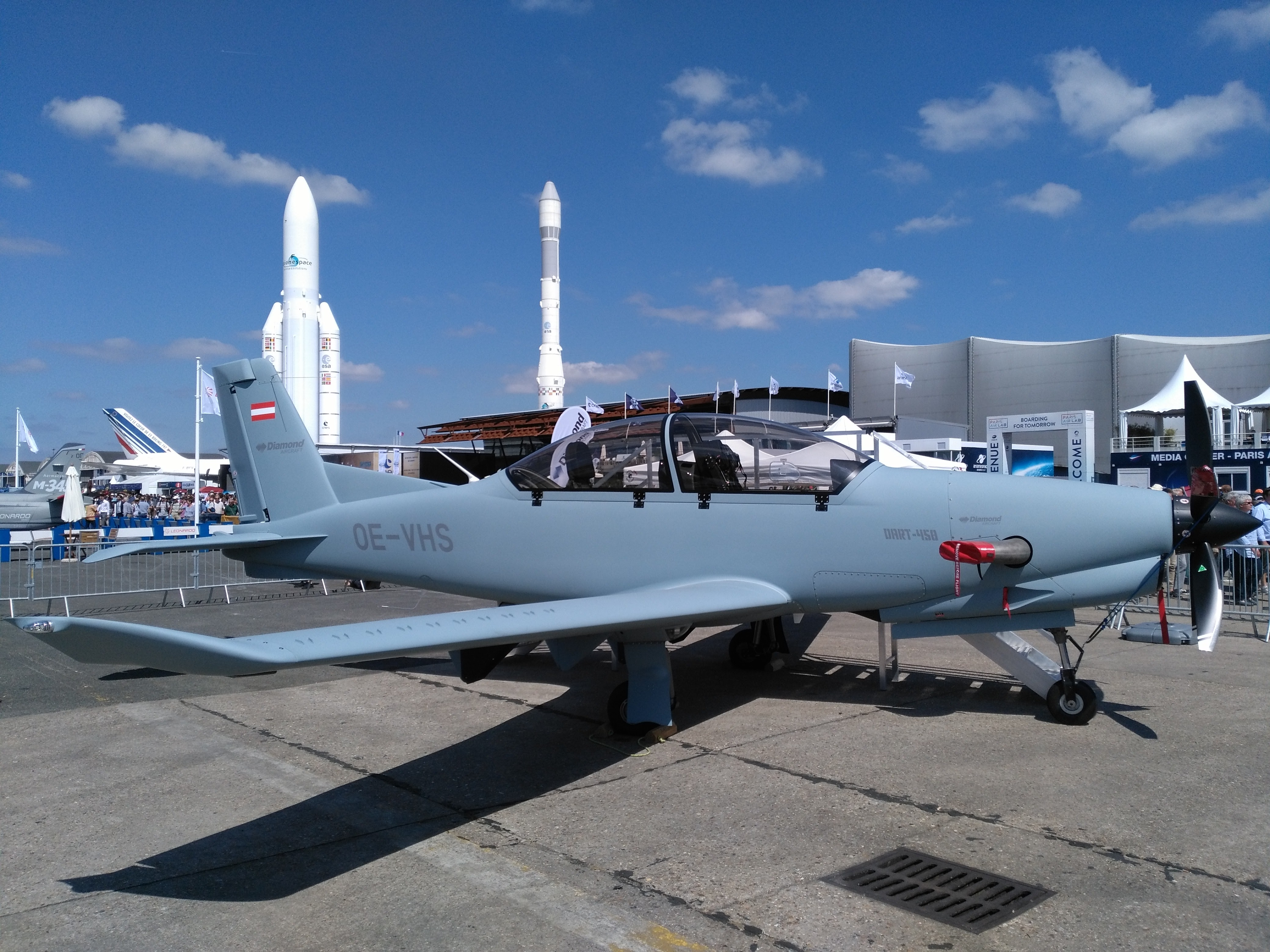
- Diamond Dart-450 Prototype on display in 2017

General information
- Type: Two-seat military training aircraft
- National origin: Austria
- Manufacturer: Diamond Aircraft

History
- First flight: 17 May 2016 (DART 450)
- Developed into: UZGA UTS-800

The Diamond DART is a series of tandem, two-seat civilian and military turboprop trainers manufactured by Austrian Diamond Aircraft, "DART" meaning Diamond Aircraft Reconnaissance Trainer.

== Development ==
The DART-450 made its first flight on 17 May 2016. Certification of the $3.1 million plane was expected by the end of 2017.

The first two deliveries were to be for a non-certificated kit version in 2017, while a certificated aircraft was expected to be delivered in September 2018. Diamond intends to deliver 50 aircraft per year. The third prototype was expected to fly in late 2017, powered by a 550hp (410kW) GE Aviation engine.

== Design ==
The DART-450 is built predominately from carbon fibre. It is powered by a 495 hp (369 kW) Ivchenko-Progress Motor Sich AI-450S turboprop engine, driving a five-bladed MT Propeller. The cockpit accommodates two crew on ejection seats. The avionics are provided by Garmin and the fuselage is able to mount an optional retractable surveillance camera, plus other equipment.

== Variants ==
Diamond DART-450
First flown on 17 May 2016. It has a 495 hp (369 kW) Ivchenko-Progress Motor Sich AI-450S turboprop, weighs 1,330 kg (2,932 lb) empty and has a 2,300 kg (5,071 lb) max takeoff weight.
Diamond DART-550
A version powered by a 550 hp (410 kW) General Electric GE H75-100 turboprop, it was first flown on 24 May 2018. It has eight hours endurance, Martin-Baker MK16 ejection seats, a Garmin G3000 cockpit, 1,600 kg (3,527 lbs) OEW, 2,400 kg (5,291 lbs) MTOW.
Diamond DART-750
Upgraded with the Pratt & Whitney Canada PT6 turboprop engine rated at 750 hp (559 kW), the aircraft had its first flight on 12 June 2023.
CETC TA-20
Chinese licensed locally manufactured variant of the DART-450 utilizing alternate Chinese avionics, first flown on 6 November 2018. It is being proposed as a possible candidate for the development of a basic military trainer aircraft for the People's Liberation Army Air Force.
UZGA UTS-800
Russian localised variant. Being manufactured in Yekaterinberg by Ural Works of Civil Aviation for the Russian Aerospace Forces as a low-cost trainer.

== Operators ==
- Russia - 3 UTS-800 Variants delivered

== Specifications (DART-450, utility (reconnaissance) configuration) ==
Data from Jane's All the World's Aircraft 2016/17 All performance figures are estimates.

General characteristics

- Crew: Two
- Length: 10.75 m (35 ft 3 in)
- Wingspan: 11.74 m (38 ft 6 in)
- Height: 3.38 m (11 ft 1 in)
- Empty weight: 1,330 kg (2,932 lb)
- Max takeoff weight: 2,300 kg (5,071 lb)
- Fuel capacity: 850 L (190 imp gal; 220 US gal) usable
- Powerplant: 1 × Ivchenko-Progress Motor Sich AI-450S turboprop, 369 kW (495 hp)
- Propellers: 5-bladed MT Propeller

Performance

- Maximum speed: 460 km/h (290 mph, 250 kn)
- Cruise speed: 430 km/h (260 mph, 230 kn)
- Stall speed: 110 km/h (69 mph, 60 kn)
- Range: 2,800 km (1,700 mi, 1,500 nmi) 30 min reserves
- Endurance: 8 hr 10 min
- Service ceiling: 7,010 m (23,000 ft) absolute
- g limits: +7/-4G
- Rate of climb: 15.2 m/s (2,990 ft/min)
- Take-off run: 600 m (2,000 ft)
- Landing run: 400 m (1,300 ft)
- fuel burn: 90 litres/hour
- operating cost: $500/hour

== See also ==
Related development

- Diamond DA50-JP7

Aircraft of comparable role, configuration, and era

- Embraer EMB 312 Tucano
- Grob G 120TP
- Pilatus PC-7
