= Let L-610 =

Transport aircraft prototype

L-610
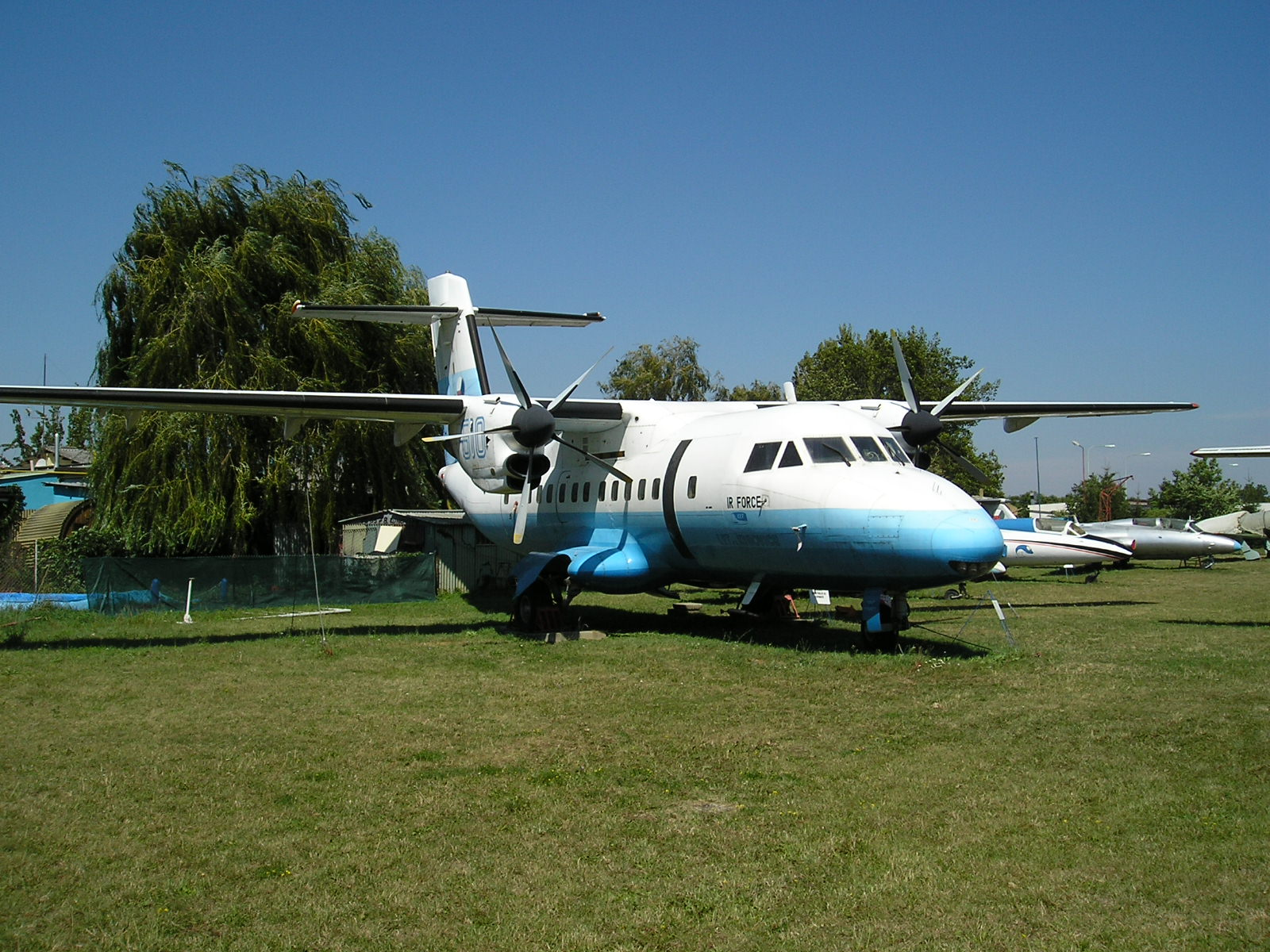
- The L-610M X05 in Kunovice museum

General information
- Type: Airliner, transport aircraft
- Manufacturer: Let Kunovice
- Designer: Antonín Píštěk
- Status: Prototype only; retired
- Primary user: Czech Republic
- Number built: 8 (6 flying and 2 for structural tests)

History
- First flight: 28 December 1988
- Developed from: Let L-410 Turbolet
- Developed into: TVRS-44 Ladoga

The Let L-610 is a prototype aircraft for the Czech civil aircraft manufacturer Let Kunovice made in 1988–1997.

== Design and development ==
In the late 1970s, after the success of the LET L-410 twin engine turboprop, the Soviet airline Aeroflot requested that LET design a replacement for the Antonov An-24 aircraft.

LET's L-610 was designed as a twin engined turboprop aircraft powered by the new Czech engine, Walter M602, with a seating capacity of 40. Flight testing was delayed by engine development taking longer than airframe development. Eventually the 1,358 kW (1,822 shp) turboprop engines were finished and the aircraft first flew on 28 December 1988. No aircraft was ever delivered to any commercial customer, although one aircraft was shown in Aeroflot markings during the Paris Air Show in the 1990s. One Let 610 M was delivered to the Czech Air Force, to support manufacturer's certification and test flights process.

After the Soviet collapse LET tried to westernize the plane in order to widen the aircraft's sales appeal. The result was a new model, known as the L-610G, which had General Electric CT7 engines, Rockwell Collins Pro Line II digital EFIS, weather radar and autopilot. The L-610G prototype flew its maiden flight on 18 December 1992; four years after the L-610M.

During the time that the now-defunct Ayres Corp. owned LET, the aircraft was also known as the Ayres L-610, and for a time was marketed as the Ayres 7000. The customer for the Ayres 7000 was to have been City Connexion Airlines before bankruptcy problems sidelined the program.

On 29 August 2019, the UGMC subsidiary, the Ural Works of Civil Aviation and the Russian regional Polar Airlines signed an agreement to supply ten L-610 aircraft from 2023 to 2025 as part of the regional aviation development program of the Russian Federation. The signing took place at the international aerospace forum MAKS 2019 in Moscow.

== Variants ==
L-610M
Basic variant with Walter M602 engines.
L-610G / Ayres 7000
Variant with General Electric XT7-9D engines.
L-610 MPA
Proposed Anti-submarine warfare variant.
TVRS-44 Ladoga
44-seat Russian variant currently in development by the Ural Works of Civil Aviation, powered by 2,400 hp (1,800 kW) Klimov TV7-117 turbprops of the Ilyushin Il-114-300 from Russia’s United Engine Corporation to replace Antonov An-24s, An-26s and Yakovlev Yak-40s.

== Specifications (L-610) ==
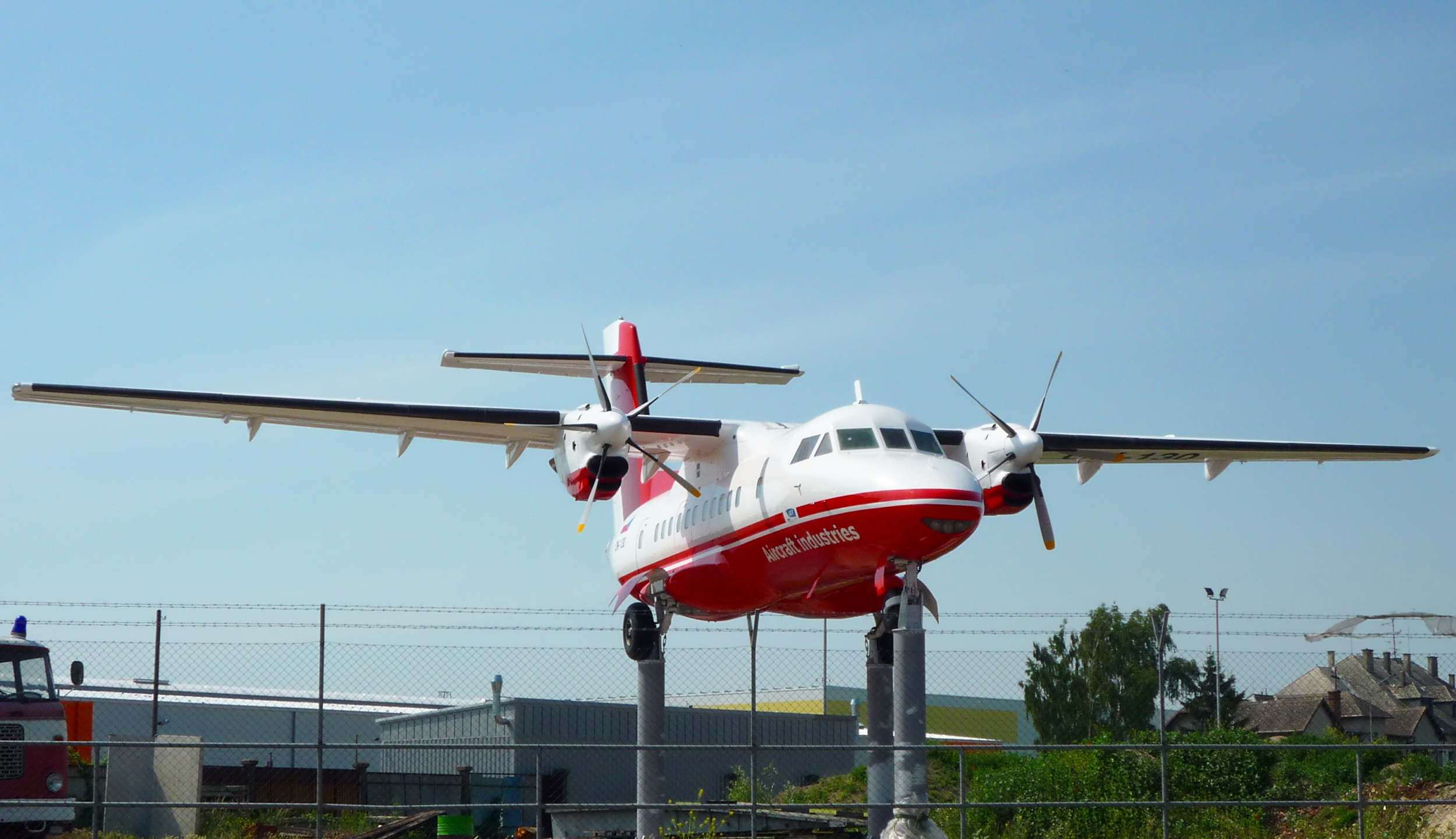
L-610M X01 OK-130 in Staré Město

Data from Brassey's World Aircraft & Systems Directory

General characteristics

- Crew: 2 (pilot, co-pilot)
- Capacity: 40 passengers / 5,000 kg (11,023 lb) max payload
- Length: 21.72 m (71 ft 3 in)
- Wingspan: 25.6 m (84 ft 0 in)
- Height: 7.6 m (24 ft 11 in)
- Wing area: 56 m^{2} (600 sq ft)
- Airfoil: root: NASA MS(1)-0318; tip: NASA MS(1)-0312
- Empty weight: 8,950 kg (19,731 lb)
- Max takeoff weight: 14,500 kg (31,967 lb)
- Powerplant: 2 × General Electric CT7-9D turboprop engines, 1,305 kW (1,750 hp) each
- Propellers: 6-bladed constant-speed propellers

Performance

- Maximum speed: 490 km/h (300 mph, 260 kn)
- Cruise speed: 438 km/h (272 mph, 237 kn)
- Range: 2,420 km (1,500 mi, 1,310 nmi)
- Service ceiling: 10,250 m (33,630 ft)
- Rate of climb: 8.5 m/s (1,670 ft/min)

== See also ==
Aircraft of comparable role, configuration, and era

- Dornier 328
- Antonov An-24
- Antonov An-26
- Antonov An-140
- ATR 42
- Bombardier Dash 8
- CASA CN-235
