= Jendrassik Cs-1 =

Hungarian turboprop engine

Cs-1
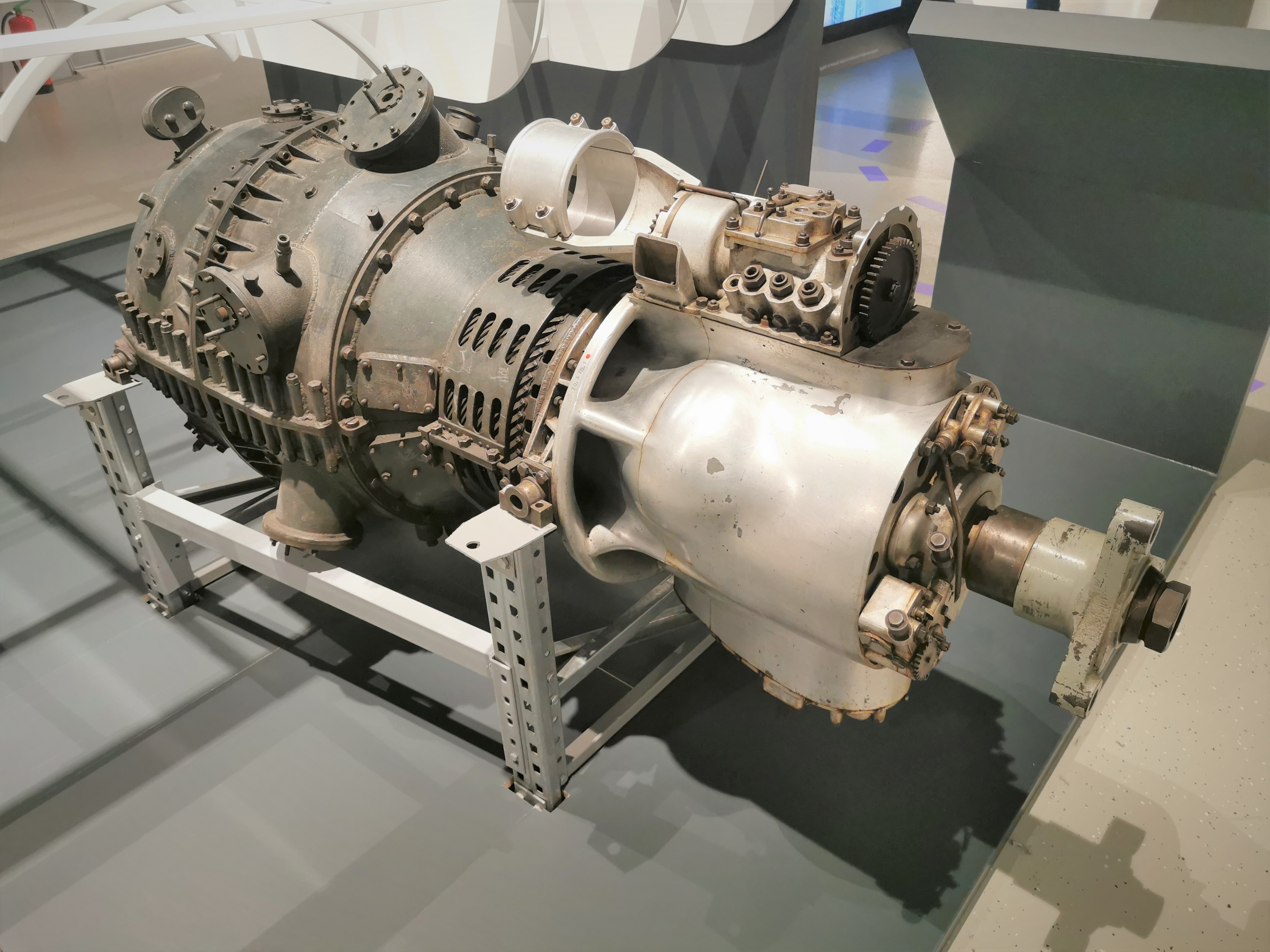
- Jendrassik Cs-1 displayed in Budapest
- Type: Turboprop
- National origin: Hungary
- Manufacturer: Ganz Works
- Designer: György Jendrassik
- First run: 1940
- Major applications: Varga RMI-1 X/H

The Jendrassik Cs-1 was the world's first working turboprop engine. It was designed by Hungarian engineer György Jendrassik in 1937, and was intended to power a Hungarian twin-engine heavy fighter, the RMI-1.

== Design and development ==
György Jendrassik worked on gas turbines and in order to speed up research, he established the Invention Development and Marketing Co. Ltd. in 1936. Following the successful running of a small experimental gas turbine engine of 100 bhp output in 1937, began to design a larger turboprop engine, which would be produced and tested in the Ganz works in Budapest.

Of axial-flow design with 15-stage compressor and 7-stage turbine, it incorporated many modern features. These included a rigid compressor-turbine rotor assembly carried on front and rear bearings. There was a single annular combustion chamber, of reverse-flow configuration to shorten the engine, air cooling of the turbine discs and turbine blades with extended roots to reduce heat transfer to the disc. The annular air intake surrounded a reduction gear for propeller drive takeoff, and the exhaust duct was also annular.

With predicted output of 1,000 bhp at 13,500 rpm the Cs-1 stirred interest in the Hungarian aircraft industry with its potential to power a modern generation of high-performance aircraft, and construction of a twin-engined fighter-bomber powered by Cs-1s, the Varga RMI-1 X/H, began.

The first bench run took place in 1940, becoming the world's first turboprop engine to run. However, combustion problems were experienced which limited the output to around 400 bhp.

Work on the engine stopped in 1941 when the Royal Hungarian Air Force selected the Messerschmitt Me 210 Ca-1 for the heavy fighter role, and the engine factory converted to producing the Daimler-Benz DB 605 to power these. The prototype RMI-1 was later fitted with these engines in 1944.

== See also ==
Related development

- Varga RMI-1 X/H

Related lists

- List of aircraft engines
