= György Jendrassik =

Hungarian physicist and mechanical engineer

- Born: György Jendrassik; 13 May 1898; Budapest, Austrian Empire
- Died: 8 February 1954; London, United Kingdom
- Education: Budapest University of Technology and Economics
- Engineering career
- Institutions: Ganz Works

György Jendrassik or George Jendrassik (1898, Budapest – 1954, London) was a Hungarian physicist and mechanical engineer.

== Early life and education ==
Jendrassik completed his education at Budapest's József Technical University, then at the University of Berlin, where he attended lectures of the famous physicists Albert Einstein and Max Planck. In 1922, he obtained his diploma in mechanical engineering in Budapest. From 1927 onward, he worked at Ganz Rt, where he helped to develop diesel engines, of which the first few pieces were made with single and double cylinders. Later, the 4- and 6-cylinder four-stroke versions were developed, without compression and with mixing chamber.

== Diesel engines ==
Jendrassik started working at Ganz and Company - Danubius Electricity, Machine, Waggon and Shipyard Ltd. He started his activities within the Study Department, which was the development and experimental department. His first work included the strength calculation and preparation of the load tests for the main girders of a new type of wagon for the Dutch coastal local railways. The Ganz Study Department came up with the idea that Diesel engines, which until then had only been used in heavy-duty factory work, should be further developed to make them mobile and much smaller, so that they could also be fit in vehicles and in industries requiring less power, such as transport. Jendrassik therefore developed designs for simple, low and medium-power, high-speed diesel engines and patented them under the name Ganz-Jendrassik engines. The final aim in designing the Ganz-Jendrassik engines was to replace the high-speed petrol engines intended for low-power tasks (i.e. trains, trucks, small cargo ships) with a more economical diesel engine that was at least as reliable and fast.

This gave Jendrassik the opportunity to study the theoretical and practical problems of the diesel engine. Jendrassik's interest soon turned to the development of diesel engines. He developed a number of patents which laid the foundations for the development of small and medium-performance diesel engines for use in vehicles. After two years of development work, the Jm 130 single-cylinder engine was produced in 1927. It had a bore of 130 mm, a stroke of 160 mm, and produced 12 hp at 1000 rpm with a specific consumption of 210 grams. This was later developed into two-, four- and six-cylinder versions, which were stable, suitable for rail and marine propulsion, and which featured a combustion chamber in the front. In 1927, seeing the success of the diesel engines, Jendrassik developed the first patents and engines within the Study Department, and in the summer of 1927 the independent Jendrassik Engine Construction Department was established. This department continued to operate after Jendrassik's death until the end of 1958. The Ganz-Jendrassik engines were the start of the motorisation of the railways, but diesel engines were also used in shipping and road vehicles.

His patents and inventions were bought by several major engine manufacturers in Europe, including the Hispano-Suiza and the British Vickers, which were the leading engine manufacturers at the time. Jendrassik was fluent in German, French, English and Spanish, due to his frequent trips to the headquarters of large Western European engineering companies in the affairs of the Ganz company and in the case of the sale of his own patents. He set up a private office in 1934, where he and his colleagues designed a six-cylinder V-type diesel engine for Hispano-Suiza. He also maintained his own office alongside Ganz Rt.

In 1934, he married Johanna Schmall, the eldest daughter of Henrik Schmall, a qualified architect. The increasingly perfected Jendrassik engines became known all over the world and enhanced the reputation of Hungarian industry, the Ganz factory and not least György Jendrassik.

Despite the increasing difficulties, he did not abandon his idea of designing a turbocharger for his already world-famous engines. His experiments with the turbocharger were conducted at the Ganz factory. After extensive experimentation, a remarkable result was achieved: the performance of the experimental engine was increased by 50% simply by raising the medium pressure. This result was sensational in 1944. Unfortunately, the practical application of the experiences gained during the experiments could not be utilized, as the work had to be halted due to the siege of Budapest.

Meanwhile, Jendrassik's authority at the Ganz company also grew, which was followed by an increase in his responsibilities and rank. Until 1939, he was a department head, holding positions as chief engineer (1927), supervisor (1930), chief supervisor (1931), and director (1936). In 1939, he was appointed deputy CEO of all factories of the Ganz Company, and in 1942, he became CEO. He only accepted the position of CEO after persuasion, in the interest of the company. His achievements were also recognized by the Hungarian Academy of Sciences, which elected him as a corresponding member on May 14, 1943; however, due to the war, he could not hold his inaugural speech.

=== Features of the Jendrassik type Diesel Engines ===
6-cylinder Ganz-Jendrassik engine from 1934

The Jendrassik engine included the following major innovations:

- Pre-chamber combustion for better mixture formation and to achieve higher operational RPM.
- Decompression device to accelerate starting and reaching normal operating conditions.
- Advanced spring-operated fuel pump.
- From the 1940 turbocharged models also appeared.

Due to its relatively high RPM, the engine was installed in smaller railcars and boats.

The engines designed for motor cars were intended to replace older gasoline engines.

== Turboprop ==
In addition to his constant engine development activities, he was also involved in the realisation of gas turbines. In his private office, the thermodynamic calculations for the future gas turbine were carried out.

Later on, Jendrassik worked on gas turbines and in order to speed up research, he established the Invention Development and Marketing Co. Ltd. in 1936. The next year he successfully ran a small experimental gas turbine engine of 100 hp.

Jendrassik next began work on a larger turboprop engine, which would emerge as the CS-1 prototype, produced and tested in the Ganz works in Budapest. Of axial-flow design with 15-stage compressor and 7-stage turbine, it incorporated many modern features. With predicted output of 1,000 bhp at 13,500 rpm the Cs-1 stirred interest in the Hungarian aircraft industry with its potential to power a modern generation of high-performance aircraft, and construction was begun of a twin-engined fighter-bomber, the Varga RMI-1 X/H, to be powered by it. Its first bench run took place in 1940, making it the world's first turboprop engine to run. However, combustion problems were experienced which limited the output to around 400 bhp. Development was discontinued in 1941, when an agreement was reached to manufacture the Daimler-Benz DB 605 engine in Hungary.

Jendrassik's became the factory's managing director from 1942 to 1945. In recognition of his scientific work, in 1943 he was elected as a corresponding member of the Hungarian Academy of Sciences.

== In exile ==
After World War II, he was not able to continue developing gas turbines. As a successful entrepreneur, political distrust surrounded him in the new communist-dominated Hungary. Before the nationalization of large companies, the communist party of Mátyás Rákosi carried out a large-scale political campaign and disparaging propaganda activities against the rich industrialists and large entrepreneurs, and made the rich socially responsible for the poverty after the war. Jendrassik no longer felt safe in Hungary. After a spell in Argentina, he moved to London in 1948 to become consultant and director to Metropolitan Railcars Ltd., controlled by Metropolitan Cammell and Metropolitan-Vickers. Since 1949, Jendrassik has also been an external consultant of Power Jets (Research and Development) Ltd., with which he worked with until his death, on the development of a pressure exchanger; this is a promising type of heat engine in which the compression and expansion of a gaseous medium is effected by direct action of the gases involved without the employment of mechanical parts such ad pistons or blades. The number of his inventions on record only in Hungary is 77. His last invention of great importance was the pressure-compensating device for jet engines at the Power Jets Ltd. He died on 8 February 1954 in London.
