= UZGA UTS-800 =

Russian wo-seat turboprop basic trainer

UTS-800

General information
- Type: Trainer aircraft
- National origin: Russia
- Manufacturer: Ural Works of Civil Aviation
- Designer: Dmitry Tinyakov
- Primary user: Russian Air Force
- Number built: 4

History
- First flight: 28 October 2023
- Initiated: 2017
- Developed from: Diamond DART

The UZGA UTS-800 (Russian: УТС-800) is a two-seat turboprop basic trainer built by Ural Works of Civil Aviation in Yekaterinburg, Russia.

The UTS-800 is intended to replace the L-39 Albatros in Russian Air Force service and operate alongside the Yak-130 advanced jet trainer, offering a more cost-effective platform for basic flight training.

The aircraft is also marketed towards flight schools and DOSAAF clubs.

== Development ==
In 2014 the Russian Ministry of Defence issued a requirement for a basic trainer to supplement the Yakovlev Yak-130 advanced trainer. Yakovlev submitted the Yak-152 while the private company KB SAT offered the SR-10. The Yak-152 was favoured by the Ministry of Defence, with its first flight on 29 September 2016. Yakovlev had chosen the RED A03 diesel engine built in Adenau, Germany. However, the supply of engines was later blocked due to German sanctions on Russia, resulting in no contracts being signed. As a result, the Ministry of Defence launched a new competition in 2021, pitting a reengined Yak-152 against the UTS-800, a domestic variant of the Diamond DART manufactured by Ural Works of Civil Aviation (UZGA). UZGA had previously engaged in the licensed production of Diamond DA-40, DA-42 and Let L-410 aircraft for the Russian domestic market. The first flight of the DART had taken place on 17 May 2016, with a variant already planned for the Chinese PLAAF. Subsequently, development of a localised variant of the aircraft began in 2017.

In August 2021, a static mockup of the UTS-800 was unveiled at the 2021 Army International Military-Technical Forum.

The UTS-800 marks the first aircraft developed and built by UZGA using paperless digital manufacturing technology for improved manufacturing precision, reduced human error and greater production efficiency.

On 28 October 2023 the first flight of the UTS-800 took place at Uktus Airport in Yekaterinburg, Due to the intended Klimov VK-800 engine still undergoing development, the aircraft was equipped with a General Electric H80 engine. On 28 December 2024, two aircraft were delivered to the Ministry of Defence for further testing. Testing of these two aircraft began in February 2025. In June 2025 it was reported that ground tests of the Zvezda K-93 ejection seats had been successful. In late November 2025, another aircraft made its first flight and joined the testing program, where the flight characteristics of the aircraft were verified.

In February 2026, UZGA reported that the first VK-800SP engines had completed testing at the Baranov Central Institute of Aviation Motor Development, with integration to the aircraft and flight certification testing expected in the near future. It was further reported that testing of the aircraft's integrated PNK-800 flight control and navigation system were underway.

== Design ==
The UTS-800 is a low-wing, cantilever monoplane with enclosed tandem seating and is a further development of the Diamond DART 450. It is powered by a Klimov VK-800SP turboprop engine, equipped with an Aerosila AV-410P propeller.

The UTS-800 features a manoeuvrable nose wheel and differential braking, a feature not found on older trainers such as the Yak-18 and Yak-52.

The aircraft is fitted with Zvezda K-93 zero-zero ejection seats, and can be optionally equipped with a pressurized cockpit. The UTS-800 contains the integrated PNK-800 flight and navigation computer, capable of performing complex simulated scenarios such as air-to-air combat or close air support.

== See also ==
- Beechcraft T-6 Texan II
- Pilatus PC-21
