= Varga RMI-1 X/H =

1944 aircraft prototype

RMI-1 X/H

General information
- Type: Fighter-bomber/Reconnaissance aircraft
- National origin: Hungary
- Manufacturer: Repülő Muszaki Intézet (RMI)
- Designer: László Varga
- Primary user: Royal Hungarian Air Force (MKHL)
- Number built: 1

History
- First flight: Undertook taxiing trials and high speed runs, but was not flown before it was destroyed

The Varga RMI-1 was a twin-engine turboprop-powered aircraft designed by Hungarian engineer László Varga, and the world's first turboprop aircraft. It was a fighter-bomber intended to test the new turboprop Jendrassik Cs-1 aero engine. Only one prototype was built, as with the signing of a mutual defence pact between Hungary and Germany in June 1941, it was decided to license produce the Daimler-Benz DB 605 piston engine and purchase the Messerschmitt Me 210 fitted with these engines to fill the fighter-bomber requirement. Due to difficulties with the original engines, the sole prototype was re-engined with German Daimler-Benz DB 605s in 1944 and undertook taxiing trials and high speed runs, but was destroyed by Allied bombing in June 1944 before making its first flight.

== Design ==
The RMI-1 was a low wing, twin-engined aircraft with two turboprop Cs-1 engines slung under the wings. It was designed to have a crew of two or three. The tail section was of the conventional type with a single vertical stabilizer.

== Specifications (X/H) ==
Data from Repülő Muszaki Intézet Varga RMI-1/ X / H

General characteristics

- Length: 12.74 m (41 ft 10 in)
- Wingspan: 15.7 m (51 ft 6 in)
- Height: 5.5 m (18 ft 1 in)
- Empty weight: 4,500 kg (9,921 lb)
- Gross weight: 6,500 kg (14,330 lb)
- Powerplant: 2 × Jendrassik Cs-1 turboprop, 750 kW (1,000 hp) each

Performance

- Maximum speed: 540 km/h (340 mph, 290 kn) estimated

Varga RMI-1 X/H prototype

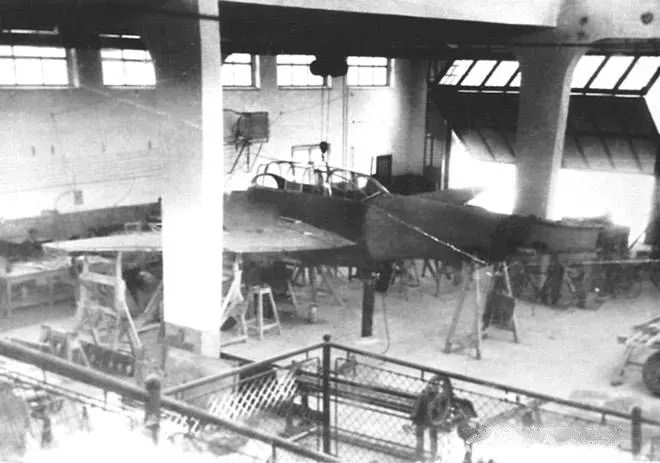
Varga RMI-1 X/H under construction

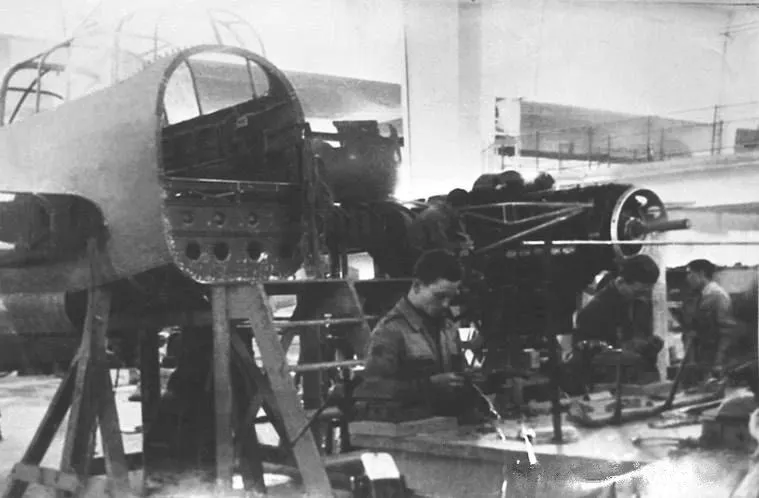
Varga RMI-1 X H under construction in 1944

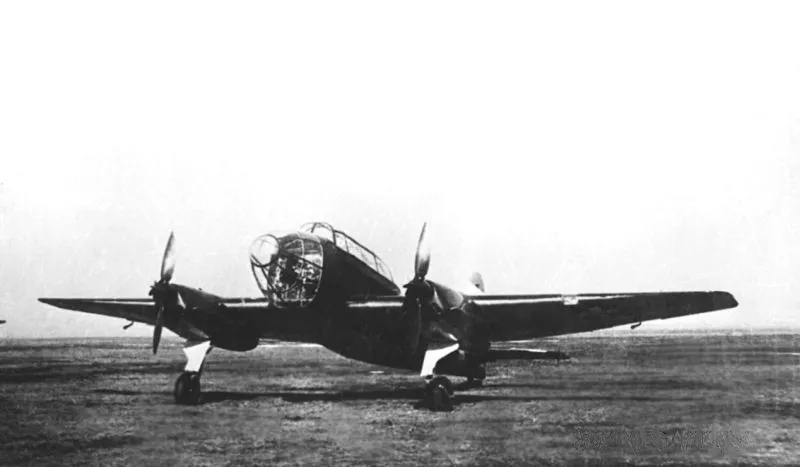
RMI-1 fighter - bomber in 1944

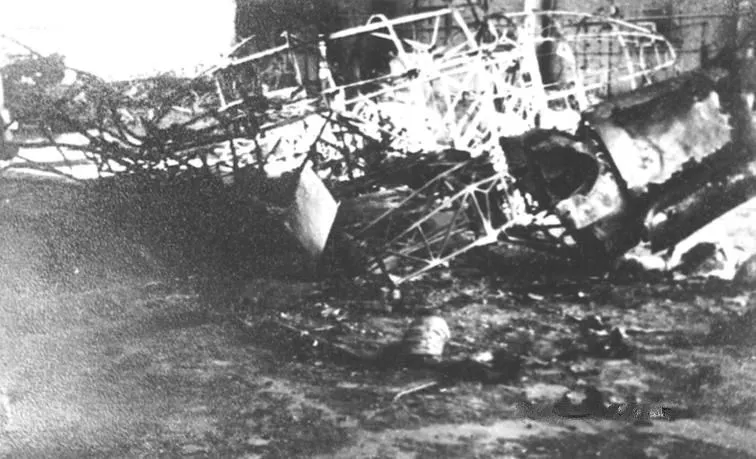
Destroyed RMI-1 prototype

== See also ==
Hungarian military aircraft from the same era

- Weiss Manfréd WM-16 Budapest
- Weiss Manfréd WM-21 Sólyom
- Weiss Manfréd WM-23 Ezüst Nyíl
- MÁVAG Héja

Aircraft of comparable role, configuration, and era

- Bristol Beaufighter
- Focke-Wulf Fw 187 Falke
- Fokker G.I
- Kawasaki Ki-45
- Messerschmitt Bf 110
- Nakajima J1N
- Petlyakov Pe-2
- Potez 630
- PZL.38 Wilk
- Westland Whirlwind

Related lists

- List of aircraft of World War II
- List of aircraft of Hungary in World War II
- List of Hungarian military equipment of World War II
- List of fighter aircraft
- List of bomber aircraft
