= Turboprop =

Turbine engine driving an aircraft propeller

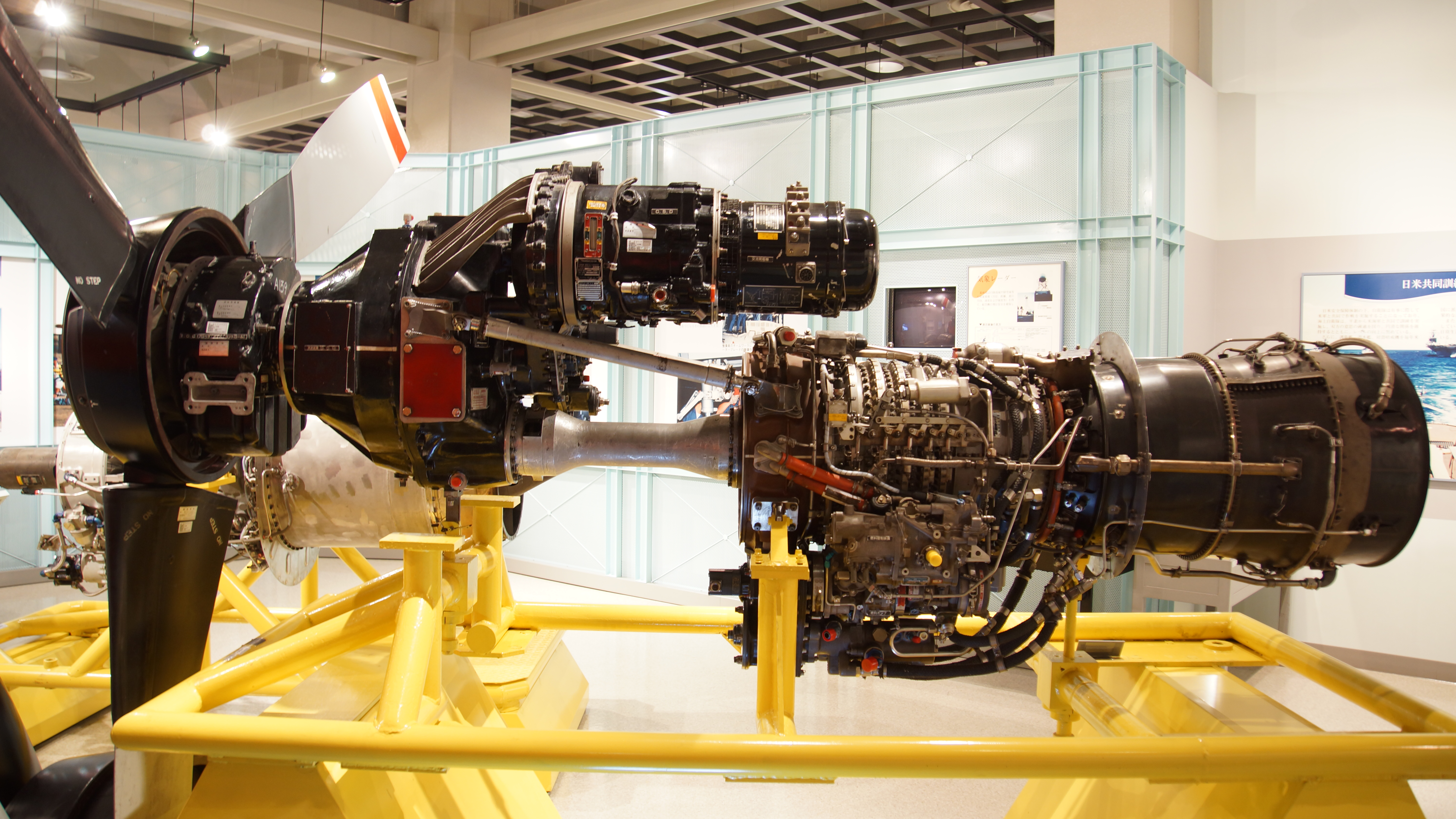
GE T64 turboprop, with the propeller on the left, the gearbox with accessories in the middle, and the gas generator (turbine) on the right

A turboprop is a gas-turbine engine that drives an aircraft propeller.

A turboprop consists of an intake, reduction gearbox, compressor, combustor, turbine, and a propelling nozzle. Air enters the intake and is compressed by the compressor. Jet fuel is then added to the compressed air in the combustor, where the fuel-air mixture then combusts. The hot combustion gases expand through the turbine stages, generating power at the point of exhaust. Some of the power generated by the turbine is used to drive the compressor and electric generator. The gases are then exhausted from the turbine. In contrast to a turbojet or turbofan, the engine's exhaust gases do not provide enough power to create a major portion of the total thrust, since almost all of the engine's power is used to drive the propeller.

== Technological aspects ==
Schematic diagram showing the operation of a turboprop engine

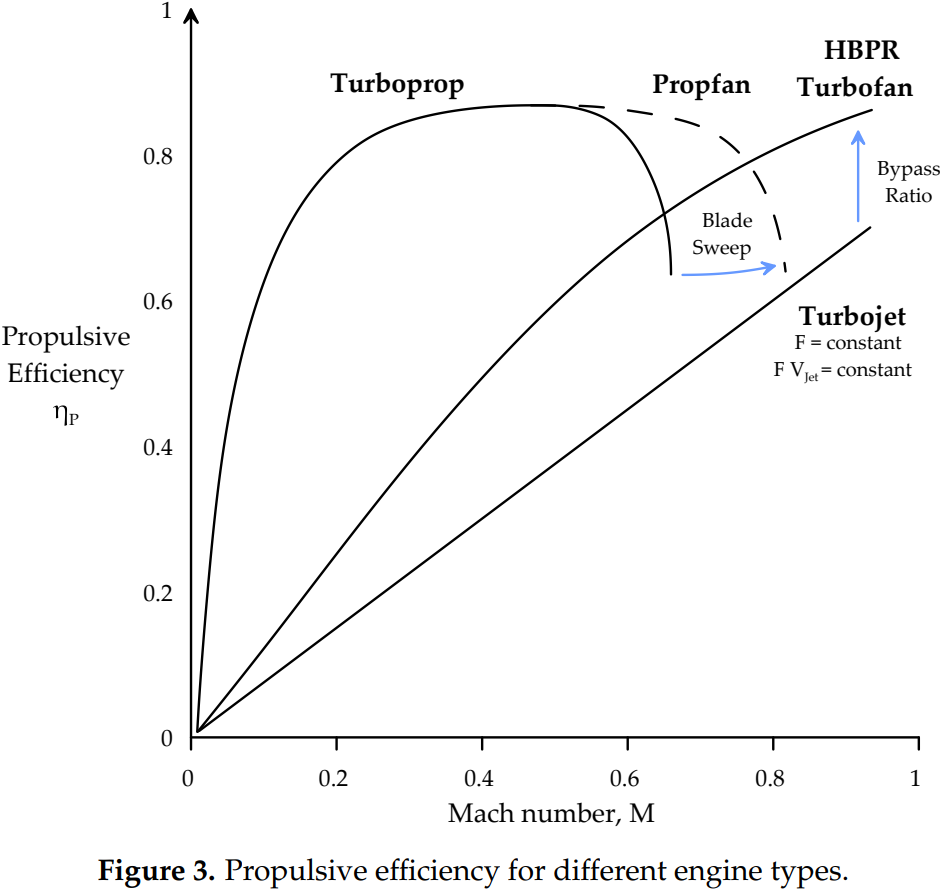
Propulsive efficiency for different engine types and Mach numbers

Exhaust thrust in a turboprop is sacrificed in favor of shaft power, which is obtained by extracting additional power (beyond that necessary to drive the compressor) from turbine expansion. Owing to the additional expansion in the turbine system, the residual energy in the exhaust jet is low. Consequently, the exhaust jet produces about 10% of the total thrust. A higher proportion of the thrust comes from the propeller at low speeds and less at higher speeds.

Turboprops have bypass ratios of 50–100, although the propulsion airflow is less clearly defined for propellers than for fans.

The propeller is coupled to the turbine through a reduction gear that converts the high RPM/low torque output to low RPM/high torque. This can be of two primary designs, free-turbine and fixed. A free-turbine turboshaft is found on the Pratt & Whitney Canada PT6, where only the turbine is connected to the propeller while the rest of the gas generator (compressor and combustor) spin independently. This allows for propeller strike or similar damage to occur without damaging the gas generator and allowing for only the power section (turbine and gearbox) to be removed and replaced in such an event, and also allows for less stress on the start during engine ground starts. By contrast, a fixed shaft engine has the gearbox, turbine, and gas generator connected on a shared shaft, such as on the Honeywell TPE331.

The propeller itself is normally a constant-speed (variable pitch) propeller type similar to that used with larger aircraft reciprocating engines, except that the propeller-control requirements are very different. Due to the turbine engine's slow response to power inputs, particularly at low speeds, the propeller has a greater range of selected travel in order to make rapid thrust changes, notably for taxi, reverse, and other ground operations. The propeller has 2 modes, Alpha and Beta. Alpha is the mode for all flight operations including takeoff. Beta, a mode typically consisting of zero to negative thrust, is used for all ground operations aside from takeoff. The Beta mode is further broken down into 2 additional modes, Beta for taxi and Beta plus power. Beta for taxi as the name implies is used for taxi operations and consists of all pitch ranges from the lowest alpha range pitch, all the way down to zero pitch, producing very little to zero-thrust and is typically accessed by moving the power lever to a beta for taxi range. Beta plus power is a reverse range and produces negative thrust, often used for landing on short runways where the aircraft would need to rapidly slow down, as well as backing operations and is accessed by moving the power lever below the beta for taxi range. Due to the pilot not being able to see out of the rear of the aircraft for backing and the amount of debris reverse stirs up, manufacturers will often limit the speeds that beta plus power may be used at and restrict its use on unimproved runways. Feathering of these propellers is performed by the propeller control lever.

The constant-speed propeller is distinguished from the reciprocating engine constant-speed propeller by the control system. The turboprop system consists of 3 propeller governors: a governor, an overspeed governor, and a fuel-topping governor. The governor works in much the same way a reciprocating engine propeller governor works, though a turboprop governor may incorporate a beta control valve or beta lift rod for beta operation and is typically located in the 12 o'clock position. There are also other governors that are included in addition depending on the model, such as an overspeed and fuel topping governor on a Pratt & Whitney Canada PT6, and an under-speed governor on a Honeywell TPE331. The turboprop is also distinguished from other kinds of turbine engine in that the fuel control unit is connected to the governor to help dictate power.

To make the engine more compact, reverse airflow can be used. On a reverse-flow turboprop engine, the compressor intake is at the aft of the engine, and the exhaust is situated forward, reducing the distance between the turbine and the propeller.

Unlike the small-diameter fans used in turbofan engines, the propeller has a large diameter that lets it accelerate a large volume of air. This permits a lower airstream velocity for a given amount of thrust. Since it is more efficient at low speeds to accelerate a large amount of air by a small degree than a small amount of air by a large degree, a low disc loading (thrust per unit disc area) increases the aircraft's energy efficiency, and this reduces the fuel use.

Propellers work well until the flight speed of the aircraft is high enough that the airflow past the blade tips reaches the speed of sound. Beyond that speed, the proportion of the power that drives the propeller that is converted to propeller thrust falls dramatically. For this reason turboprop engines are not commonly used on aircraft that fly faster than 0.6–0.7 Mach, with some exceptions such as the Tupolev Tu-95. However, propfan engines, which are very similar to turboprop engines, can cruise at flight speeds approaching 0.75 Mach. To maintain propeller efficiency across a wide range of airspeeds, turboprops use constant-speed (variable-pitch) propellers. The blades of a constant-speed propeller increase their pitch as aircraft speed increases. Another benefit of this type of propeller is that it can also be used to generate reverse thrust to reduce stopping distance on the runway. Additionally, in the event of an engine failure, the propeller can be feathered, thus minimizing the drag of the non-functioning propeller.

While the power turbine may be integral with the gas generator section, many turboprops today feature a free power turbine on a separate coaxial shaft. This enables the propeller to rotate freely, independent of compressor speed.

== History ==
Drawings of the Hungarian Varga RMI-1 X/H – the world's first working turboprop-powered aircraft.

Alan Arnold Griffith had published a paper on compressor design in 1926. Subsequent work at the Royal Aircraft Establishment investigated axial compressor-based designs that would drive a propeller. From 1929, Frank Whittle began work on centrifugal compressor-based designs that would use all the gas power produced by the engine for jet thrust.

The world's first turboprop was designed by the Hungarian mechanical engineer György Jendrassik. Jendrassik published a turboprop idea in 1928, and on 12 March 1929 he patented his invention. In 1938, he built a small-scale (100 Hp; 74.6 kW) experimental gas turbine. The larger Jendrassik Cs-1, with a predicted output of 1,000 bhp, was produced and tested at the Ganz Works in Budapest between 1937 and 1941. It was of axial-flow design with 15 compressor and 7 turbine stages, annular combustion chamber. First run in 1940, combustion problems limited its output to 400 bhp. Two Jendrassik Cs-1s were the engines for the world's first turboprop aircraft – the Varga RMI-1 X/H. This was a Hungarian fighter-bomber of WWII which had one model completed, but before its first flight it was destroyed in a bombing raid. In 1941, the engine was abandoned due to war, and the factory converted to conventional engine production.

A Rolls-Royce RB.50 Trent on a test rig at Hucknall, in March 1945

The first mention of turboprop engines in the general public press was in the February 1944 issue of the British aviation publication Flight, which included a detailed cutaway drawing of what a possible future turboprop engine could look like. The drawing was very close to what the future Rolls-Royce Trent would look like. The first British turboprop engine was the Rolls-Royce RB.50 Trent, a converted Derwent II fitted with reduction gear and a Rotol 7 ft 11 in (2.41 m) five-bladed propeller. Two Trents were fitted to Gloster Meteor EE227 — the sole "Trent-Meteor" — which thus became the world's first turboprop-powered aircraft to fly, albeit as a test-bed not intended for production. It first flew on 20 September 1945. From their experience with the Trent, Rolls-Royce developed the Rolls-Royce Clyde, the first turboprop engine to receive a type certificate for military and civil use, and the Dart, which became one of the most reliable turboprop engines ever built. Dart production continued for more than fifty years. The Dart-powered Vickers Viscount was the first turboprop aircraft of any kind to go into production and sold in large numbers. It was also the first four-engined turboprop. Its first flight was on 16 July 1948. The world's first single engined turboprop aircraft was the Armstrong Siddeley Mamba-powered Boulton Paul Balliol, which first flew on 24 March 1948.

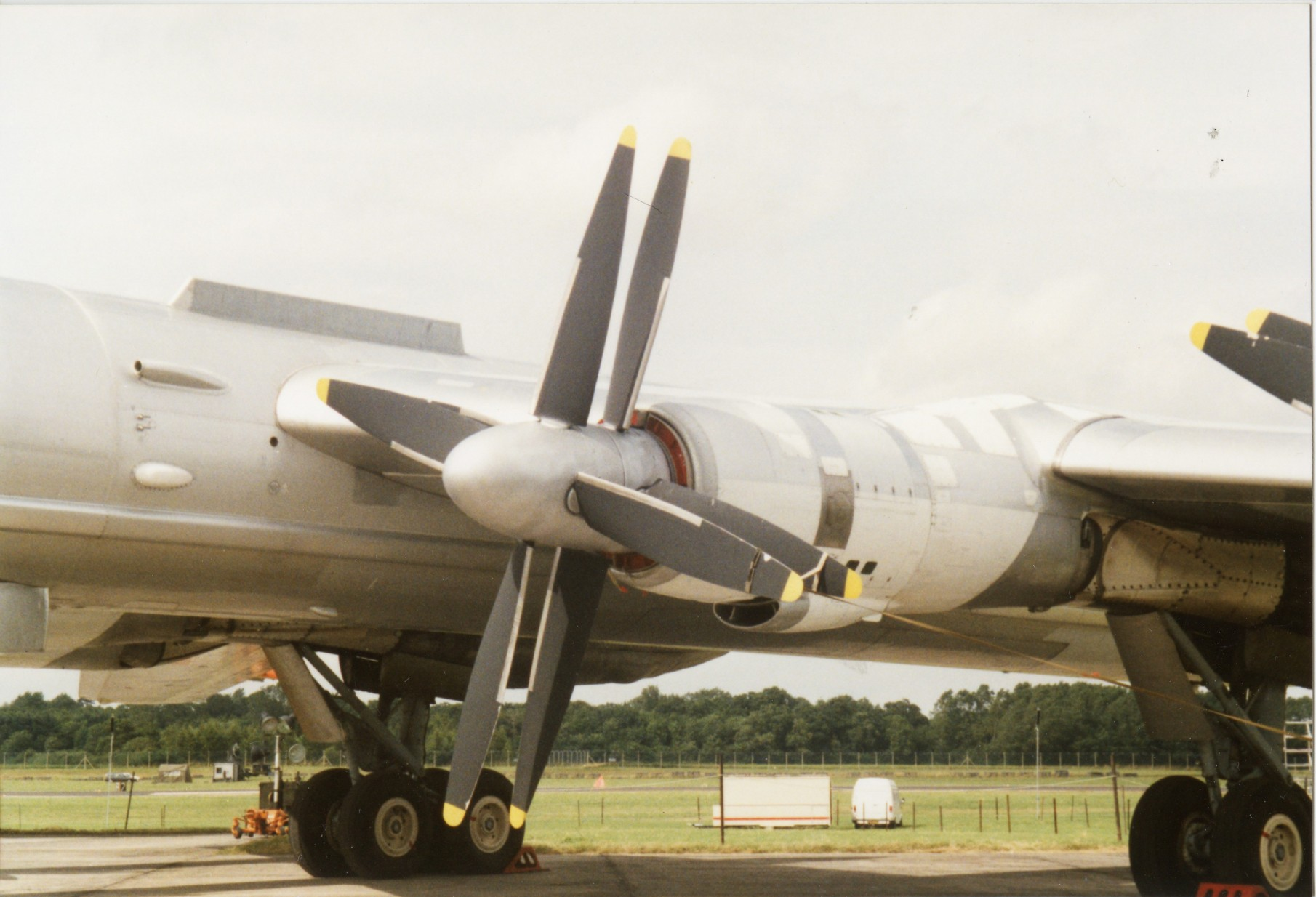
The Kuznetsov NK-12 is the most powerful turboprop to enter service

The Soviet Union built on German World War II turboprop preliminary design work by Junkers Motorenwerke, while BMW, Heinkel-Hirth and Daimler-Benz also worked on projected designs. While the Soviet Union had the technology to create the airframe for a jet-powered strategic bomber comparable to Boeing's B-52 Stratofortress, they instead produced the Tupolev Tu-95 Bear, powered with four Kuznetsov NK-12 turboprops, mated to eight contra-rotating propellers (two per nacelle) with supersonic tip speeds to achieve maximum cruise speeds in excess of 575 mph, faster than many of the first jet aircraft and comparable to jet cruising speeds for most missions. The Bear would serve as their most successful long-range combat and surveillance aircraft and symbol of Soviet power projection through to the end of the 20th century. The USA used turboprop engines with contra-rotating propellers, such as the Allison T40, on some experimental aircraft during the 1950s. The T40-powered Convair R3Y Tradewind flying-boat was operated by the U.S. Navy for a short time.

The first American turboprop engine was the General Electric XT31, first used in the experimental Consolidated Vultee XP-81. The XP-81 first flew in December 1945, the first aircraft to use a combination of turboprop and turbojet power. The technology of Allison's earlier T38 design evolved into the Allison T56, used to power the Lockheed Electra airliner, its military maritime patrol derivative the P-3 Orion, and the C-130 Hercules military transport aircraft.

The first turbine-powered, shaft-driven helicopter was the Kaman K-225, a development of Charles Kaman's K-125 synchropter, which used a Boeing T50 turboshaft engine to power it on 11 December 1951.

December 1963 saw the first delivery of Pratt & Whitney Canada's PT6 turboprop engine for the then Beechcraft 87, soon to become Beechcraft King Air.

1964 saw the first deliveries of the Garrett AiResearch TPE331, (now owned by Honeywell Aerospace) on the Mitsubishi MU-2, making it the fastest turboprop aircraft for that year.

== Usage ==
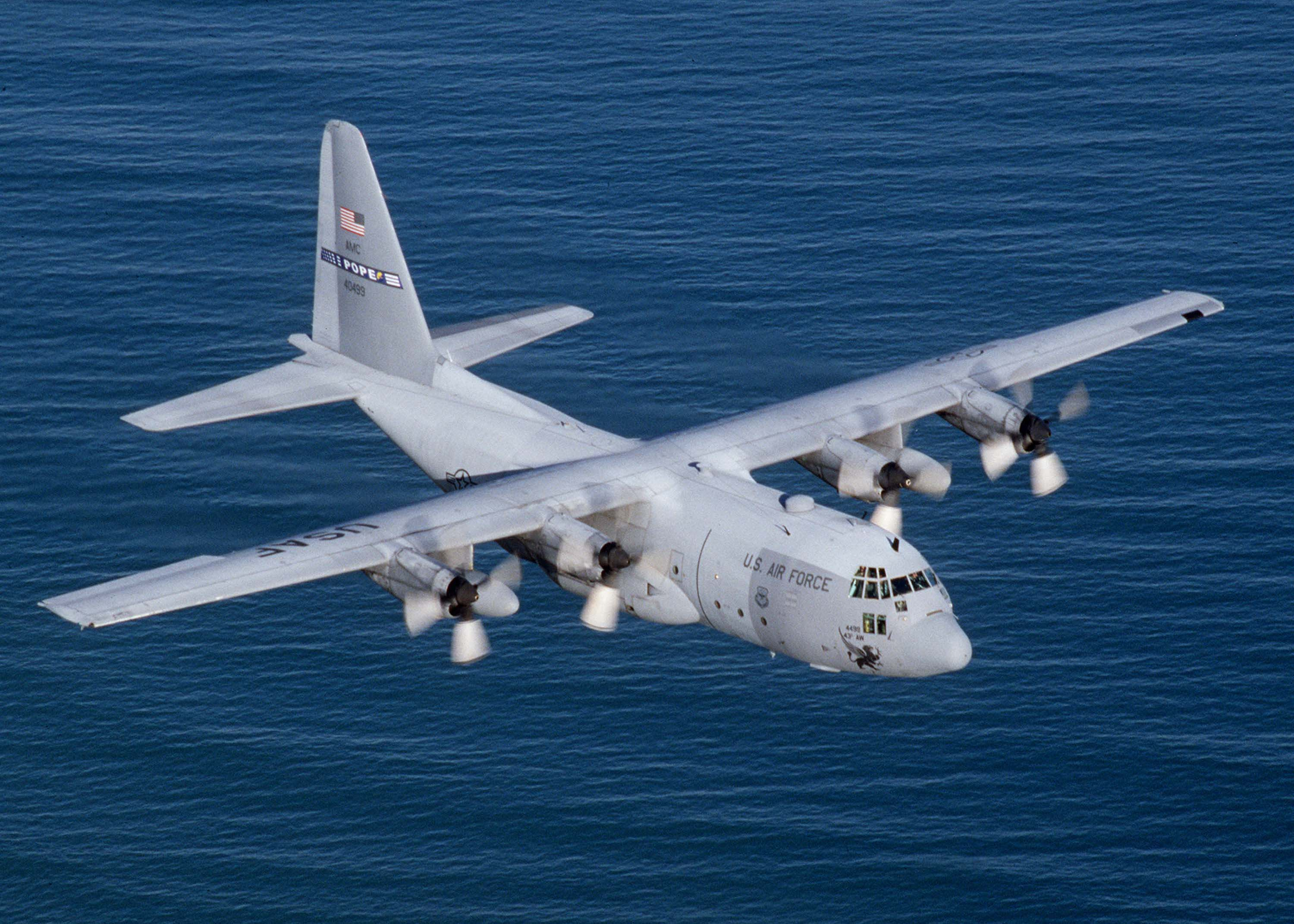
A military transport aircraft, over 2,500 Lockheed C-130 Hercules have been built

In contrast to turbofans, turboprops are most efficient at flight speeds below 725 km/h (450 mph; 390 knots) because the jet velocity of the propeller (and exhaust) is relatively low. Modern turboprop airliners operate at nearly the same speed as small regional jet airliners but burn two-thirds of the fuel per passenger.

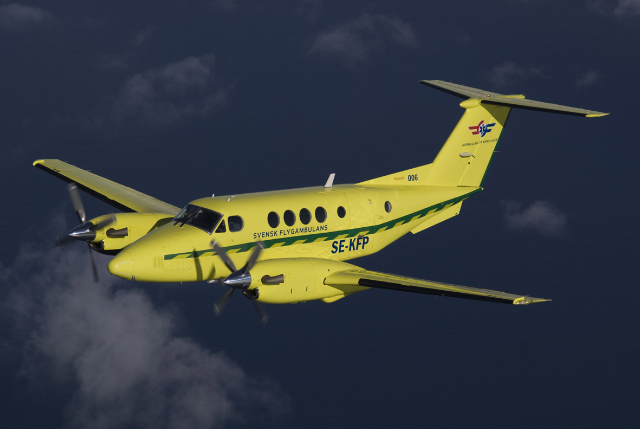
The Beech King Air and Super King Air are the most popular turboprop business aircraft, with a combined 7,300 deliveries as of May 2018

Compared to piston engines, their greater power-to-weight ratio (which allows for shorter takeoffs) and reliability can offset their higher initial cost, maintenance and fuel consumption. As jet fuel can be easier to obtain than avgas in remote areas, turboprop-powered aircraft like the Cessna Caravan and Quest Kodiak are used as bush airplanes.

Turboprop engines are generally used on small subsonic aircraft, but the Tupolev Tu-114 can reach 470 kn (870 km/h; 540 mph). Large military aircraft, like the Tupolev Tu-95, and civil aircraft, such as the Lockheed L-188 Electra, were also turboprop powered. The Airbus A400M is powered by four Europrop TP400 engines, the second most powerful turboprop engines ever produced, after the 11 MW (15,000 hp) Kuznetsov NK-12.

In 2017, the most widespread turboprop airliners in service were the ATR 42/72 (950 aircraft), Bombardier Q400 (506), De Havilland Canada Dash 8-100/200/300 (374), Beechcraft 1900 (328), de Havilland Canada DHC-6 Twin Otter (270), Saab 340 (225). Less widespread and older airliners include the BAe Jetstream 31, Embraer EMB 120 Brasilia, Fairchild Swearingen Metroliner, Dornier 328, Saab 2000, Xian MA60, MA600 and MA700, Fokker 27 and 50.

Turboprop business aircraft include the Piper Meridian, Socata TBM, Pilatus PC-12, Piaggio P.180 Avanti, Beechcraft King Air and Super King Air. In April 2017, there were 14,311 business turboprops in the worldwide fleet.

=== Reliability ===
Between 2012 and 2016, the ATSB observed 417 events with turboprop aircraft, 83 per year, over 1.4 million flight hours: 2.2 per 10,000 hours. Three were "high risk" involving engine malfunction and unplanned landing in single‑engine Cessna 208 Caravans, four "medium risk" and 96% "low risk". Two occurrences resulted in minor injuries due to engine malfunction and terrain collision in agricultural aircraft and five accidents involved aerial work: four in agriculture and one in an air ambulance.

== Current engines ==
Jane's All the World's Aircraft. 2005–2006.

Manufacturer	Country	Designation	Dry weight (kg)	Takeoff rating (kW)	Application
Europrop International	Multinational	TP400-D6	1800	8203	Airbus A400M
General Electric	United States	CT7-5A	365	1294	
General Electric	United States	CT7-9	365	1447	CASA/IPTN CN-235, Let L-610, Saab 340, Sukhoi Su-80
General Electric	United States / Czech Republic	H80 Series	200	550–625	Thrush Model 510, Let 410NG, Let L-410 Turbolet UVP-E, CAIGA Primus 150, Nextant G90XT
General Electric	United States	T64-P4D	538	2535	Aeritalia G.222, de Havilland Canada DHC-5 Buffalo, Kawasaki P-2J
Honeywell	United States	TPE331 Series	150–275	478–1650	Aero/Rockwell Turbo Commander 680/690/840/960/1000, Antonov An-38, Ayres Thrush, BAe Jetstream 31/32, BAe Jetstream 41, CASA C-212 Aviocar, Cessna 441 Conquest II, Dornier 228, General Atomics MQ-9 Reaper, Grumman Ag Cat, Mitsubishi MU-2, North American Rockwell OV-10 Bronco, Piper PA-42 Cheyenne, RUAG 228NG, Short SC.7 Skyvan, Short Tucano, Swearingen Merlin, Fairchild Swearingen Metroliner, HAL HTT-40
Honeywell	United States	LTP 101-700	147	522	Air Tractor AT-302, Piaggio P.166
KKBM	Russia	NK-12MV	1900	11033	Antonov An-22, Tupolev Tu-95, Tupolev Tu-114
Progress	Ukraine	TV3-117VMA-SB2	560	1864	Antonov An-140
Klimov	Russia	TV7-117S	530	2100	Ilyushin Il-112, Ilyushin Il-114
Ivchenko-Progress	Ukraine	AI20M	1040	2940	Antonov An-12, Antonov An-32, Ilyushin Il-18
Ivchenko-Progress	Ukraine	AI24T	600	1880	Antonov An-24, Antonov An-26, Antonov An-30
LHTEC	United States	LHTEC T800	517	2013	Ayres LM200 Loadmaster (not built)
OMKB	Russia	TVD-20	240	1081	Antonov An-3, Antonov An-38
Pratt & Whitney Canada	Canada	PT-6 Series	149–260	430–1500	Air Tractor AT-502, Air Tractor AT-602, Air Tractor AT-802, Beechcraft Model 99, Beechcraft King Air, Beechcraft Super King Air, Beechcraft 1900, Beechcraft T-6 Texan II, Cessna 208 Caravan, Cessna 425 Corsair/Conquest I, de Havilland Canada DHC-6 Twin Otter, Harbin Y-12, Embraer EMB 110 Bandeirante, Let L-410 Turbolet, Piaggio P.180 Avanti, Pilatus PC-6 Porter, Pilatus PC-12, Piper PA-42 Cheyenne, Piper PA-46-500TP Meridian, Shorts 360, Daher TBM 700, Daher TBM 850, Daher TBM 900, Embraer EMB 314 Super Tucano
Pratt & Whitney Canada	Canada	PW120	418	1491	ATR 42-300/320
Pratt & Whitney Canada	Canada	PW121	425	1603	ATR 42-300/320, Bombardier Dash 8 Q100
Pratt & Whitney Canada	Canada	PW123 C/D	450	1603	Bombardier Dash 8 Q300
Pratt & Whitney Canada	Canada	PW126 C/D	450	1950	BAe ATP
Pratt & Whitney Canada	Canada	PW127	481	2051	ATR 72
Pratt & Whitney Canada	Canada	PW150A	717	3781	Bombardier Dash 8 Q400
PZL	Poland	TWD-10B	230	754	PZL M28
RKBM	Russia	TVD-1500S	240	1044	Sukhoi Su-80
Rolls-Royce Limited	United Kingdom	Dart Mk 536	569	1700	Avro 748, Fokker F27, Vickers Viscount
Rolls-Royce Limited	United Kingdom	Tyne 21	1085	4500	Aeritalia G.222, Breguet Atlantic, Transall C-160
Rolls-Royce plc	United Kingdom	250-B17	88.4	313	Fuji T-7, Britten-Norman Turbine Islander, O&N Cessna 210, Soloy Cessna 206, Propjet Bonanza
Rolls-Royce plc	United Kingdom	Allison T56	828–880	3424–3910	P-3 Orion, E-2 Hawkeye, C-2 Greyhound, C-130 Hercules
Rolls-Royce plc	United Kingdom	AE2100A	715.8	3095	Saab 2000
Rolls-Royce plc	United Kingdom	AE2100J	710	3424	ShinMaywa US-2
Rolls-Royce plc	United Kingdom	AE2100D2, D3	702	3424	Alenia C-27J Spartan, Lockheed Martin C-130J Super Hercules
Rybinsk	Russia	TVD-1500V	220	1156	
Saturn	Russia	TAL-34-1	178	809	
Turbomeca	France	Arrius 1D	111	313	Socata TB 31 Omega
Turbomeca	France	Arrius 2F	103	376	Socata TB 31 Omega
Walter	Czech Republic	M601 Series	200	560	Let L-410 Turbolet, Aerocomp Comp Air 10 XL, Aerocomp Comp Air 7, Ayres Thrush, Dornier Do 28, Lancair Propjet, Let Z-37T, Let L-420, Myasishchev M-101T, PAC FU-24 Fletcher, Progress Rysachok, PZL-106 Kruk, PZL-130 Orlik, SM-92T Turbo Finist
Walter	Czech Republic	M602A	570	1360	Let L-610
Walter	Czech Republic	M602B	480	1500	Let L-610

== See also ==
- Intake momentum drag
- Jet engine
- Jetboat
- Scimitar propeller
- Supercharger
- Tiltrotor
- Turbocharger
- Smith XP-99 Prop-Jet
- Motorjet
