= JSC Russian Machines =

Russian conglomerate

- Native name: ООО «Русские машины»
- Romanized name: OOO "Russkiye mashiny"
- Type: Joint-stock company
- Industry: Mechanical engineering
- Founded: 2011
- Headquarters: Moscow, Russia
- Area served: Russia
- Key people: Oleg Burkatsky (CEO)
- Products: Automotive components, railway cars, aircraft, road construction machinery, agricultural machinery
- Owner: Basic Element
- Number of employees: 68,000
- Parent: Basic Element (100%)

JSC Russian Machines (Russian: ООО «Русские машины») is a Russian conglomerate that consists of industrial and engineering divisions. The group currently operates 27 plants throughout 12 regions in Russia and produces mechanical engineering products including motor vehicles, car parts, rail cars, aircraft, farming and construction equipment. Russian Machines was established in 2011 from a group of industrial assets owned by Oleg Deripaska's Basic Element, a Russian industrial group which wholly owns Russian Machines.

== Structure ==
The Russian Machines Group combines industrial operations in the following sectors:

- Automotive
- Automotive components
- Railway engineering
- Aircraft manufacturing
- Road construction machinery
- Agricultural machinery

== Automotive ==
Russian Machines is involved in the manufacturing, sales and servicing of the automotive assets for the "GAZ Group", the largest automotive company in Russia. GAZ Group was founded in 2005, after restructuring the production assets of "Ruspromavto" OJSK (started in 2001). The structure of GAZ Group includes 13 Russian automotive companies as well as sales and service companies. The company's headquarters are located in Moscow. Proceeds from the sale of the GAZ Group in 2012 amounted to 127 billion rubles.

== Aircraft manufacturing ==
Russian Machines' Aircraft Manufacturing utilizes the assets of the Aviakor plant, located in Samara and is one of the largest Russian aircraft construction enterprises.

Aviakor constructs, repairs, maintenances, and supplies spare parts for passenger aircraft the Antonov An-140 and Tupolev Tu-154. Launch of An-140 serial production on Aviakor reinforced the creation of the "International Aircraft project-140"(Russian: Международный авиационный проект-140) in collaboration with Kharkiv State Aircraft Manufacturing Company (KSAMC). The joint enterprise was founded on 15 September 2003 upon mutual agreement of Konstantin Titov, Governor of Samara region, and Pavlo Naumenko, General Director of KSAMC

The company owns Bezymyanka Airport.

== Railroad machinery ==
The uniform asset management center of Russian Machines in the field of railway engineering, JSC "Russian Corporation of Transport Machine Building" ("RKTM"), includes companies owned by Russian Machines and the shareholders of the VCR Group of companies. RKTM companies produce railroad cars and containers of various types, as well as railway castings and components for rolling stock. Companies included in the Russian Corporation of Transport Engineering:

- JSC "Abakanvagonmash" (ОАО «Абаканвагонмаш») (Abakan, Khakassia Republic) — the largest machine-building enterprise of Russia that specializes in the production of universal (special) containers and fitting platforms of 40 or 60 feet (12 or 18 m).
- JSC "Ruzkhimmash" (ОАО «Рузхиммаш») (Ruzaevsky Transport Mechanical Engineering Plant) (Ruzaevka, Mordovia) — produces railway tank wagons, open wagons, platforms of various types, as well as gas appliances and equipment for oil-filling stations.
- LLC "VKM-Stal" (ООО «ВКМ-Сталь») (Saransk) — mass-produces 180 types of casting products, 200 names for the machine tool repair and operational needs, which includes cast iron, heat-resistant steel, and cast steel. Products are delivered to 150 Russian enterprises.
- JSC "Vismut" (ОАО «Висмут») (Ruzaevka, Mordovia) — produces a range of insulation products used in the overhaul of the upper structure of railway track, as well as 3 types of semiconductor control equipment used in lighting complex passenger railroad cars.

Products of the railway sector of Russian Machines are operating in 16 countries, including Germany, the Netherlands, Belgium, Norway, and Finland.

== Management ==
On 15 November 2010, Siegfried Wolf (Russian: Зигфрид Вольф) became the head of the board of directors at Russian Machines and GAZ. Formerly, he was a co-director of the Canadian firm Magna International.
