= Aviakor =

Aviation plant in Samara, Russia

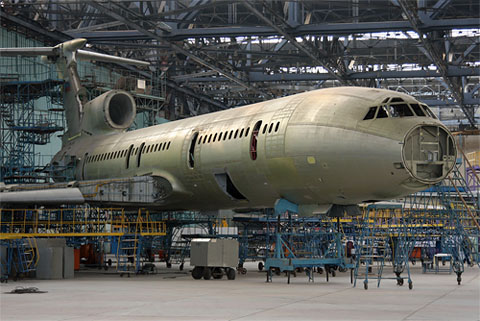
- Native name: Авиако́р
- Type: Open joint-stock company
- Founded: 1941
- Headquarters: Samara, Russia
- Key people: Alexey Viktorovich Gusev (CEO); Alexandr Valerievich Filatov (Chairman)
- Products: Tupolev Tu-154; Antonov An-140
- Parent: Russian Machines
- Subsidiaries: International Aircraft project-140; CJSC "Aviacor-Service"
- Website: www.aviacor.ru

OJSC Aviakor (Russian: ОАО Авиако́р) is an aviation plant located in Samara, Russia. It is part of the JSC Russian Machines holding under control of the financial industrial group Basic Element owned by Oleg Deripaska. Aviakor constructs, repairs, maintenances, and supplies spare parts for passenger aircraft the Antonov An-140 and Tupolev Tu-154. Launch of An-140 serial production on Aviakor reinforced the creation of the "International Aircraft project-140" (Russian: Международный авиационный проект-140) in collaboration with Kharkiv State Aircraft Manufacturing Company (KSAMC). The joint enterprise was founded on 15 September 2003 upon mutual agreement of Konstantin Titov, Governor of Samara region, and Pavlo Naumenko, General Director of KSAMC

The company owns Bezymyanka Airport.

== History ==
Before World War II Aircraft Plant No. 18 was founded and worked in the city of Voronezh since March 1932. Since the same year the Voronezh Aircraft Plant No. 18 was producing 11 types of aircraft. Since 1939 it was producing the Il-2, and to the beginning of 1941 it produced about 1,510 planes of that type. In USSR Kuibyshev Aviation Plant (No.18) was one of the five largest plants in the aviation industry. During World War II the factory produced 15,099 Ilyushin Il-2s.

For more than half a century the plant produced Tupolev, Antonov and Ilyushin-designed aircraft.

After problems receiving An-140 supplies, Aviakor filed for insolvency by the end of September 2017.

== Owners and management ==
- Chairman of the Aviakor — Alexandr Valerievich Filatov.
- CEO of Aviakor — Alexey Viktorovich Gusev.

With the creation of United Aircraft Corporation, Aviakor, according to estimate of Sergei Likharev (CEO of Aviakor), is only one of the plants producing passenger aircraft was not included in its structure. Negotiations on joining the plant to JSC United Aircraft Corporation are conducted since 2008. In summer 2010, Irkut Corporation, part of the United Aircraft Corporation, has bought 10% stake in Aviakor. However, as of August 2011, did not happen any further increasing the share or entering the representatives of Irkut to the board of directors.

== Activity ==
The plant is one of the few enterprises in Russia that have experience in the field of mass production of civil and military aircraft from parts, assemblies and assemblies of its own production. Over the years the plant has produced Il-2, Tu-4, Tu-94, Tu-154, Tu-142 and other models. During its existence it has produced more than 22500 aircraft.

For 2024 the plant's current activities included the overhaul of Tu-154, maintenance of Tu-154, Tu-95, An-140 and An-74 aircraft, and the supply of components for various types of aircraft.

Since March 2022, Aviakor has been participating in the project to create a new Russian turboprop aircraft TVRS-44 Ladoga developed by Ural Works of Civil Aviation.

In June 2022 the authorities of the Samara Region announced their intention to resume production of their own regional aircraft at Aviakor. The working name of the new car is D-70. However in October 2023 it became known that the project had been postponed indefinitely.

In December 2022 it became known about Aviakor's intention to supply portholes for MS-21 and SSJ-100 aircraft as part of the import substitution program. The first batch of portholes has already been delivered to the customer.

In August 2023, Aviakor presented its new product, the SVP-800 amphibious hovercraft, at the Army—2023 forum. The vessel has already passed pilot operation and can be launched in series in 2025.

== See also ==
- Aircraft industry of Russia
