= Basic Element (company) =

Russian industrial group

Basic Element Group of Companies
- Type: Diversified industrial group Private company limited by shares
- Industry: Energy, Manufacturing, Financial Services, Construction and Aviation.
- Founded: 1997
- Founder: Oleg Deripaska
- Headquarters: Moscow, Russia (Head office); Jersey (Registered office)
- Key people: Valery Pechenkin (General Director); Gulzan Moldazhanova
- Revenue: US$27 billion (2012)
- Owner: Oleg Deripaska
- Number of employees: Approximately 150,000 (2014)
- Website: www.basel.ru

Basic Element Ltd. (Russian: Ба́зовый элеме́нт, romanized: Bazovy element, IPA: [ˈbazəvɨj ɨlʲɪˈmʲent], or simply Базэл) is one of the largest diversified industrial groups in Russia. The company was founded in 1997 and is owned by Oleg Deripaska. It is based in the British tax haven of Jersey and is headquartered in Moscow. It was known as Siberian Aluminum until 2001.

== Overview ==
Basic Element manages Oleg Deripaska's investments into the six economic sectors of energy and mining, manufacturing, financial services, construction and real estate, agribusiness, and airport and airline management.

Over 150,000 people work at the group's companies in Russia and the CIS, Africa, Australia, Asia, Europe, and Latin America as of 2014.

In 2007 the company's revenues were US$26.8 billion, representing 45% growth relative to the previous year, and it had US$45 billion worth of assets. In 2012 the company's revenues were US$27 billion.

Basic Element built several Olympic facilities for 2014 Winter Olympics in Sochi, including the Coastal Olympic Village, Imeretisnkiy sea port, Doubler of Kurortny Avenue in Sochi, renovation of the Sochi International Airport. The total investments account for over $1.4 billion.

In June 2016, after the United States Treasury listed Basel on its list of Russian Oligarchs, Officials, and Entities in Response to Worldwide Malign Activity, Valery Pechenkin (Russian: Валерий Печенкин) became the general director of Basel, replacing Gulzhan Moldazhanova (Russian: Гульжан Молдажанова). Moldazhanova had been the general director from 2005 until 2009, when Deripaska became general director, and then again from the summer of 2012 until June 2018. (Note: Lieutenant General Valery P. Pechenkin (Russian: Валерий Печенкин) was in the Russian intelligence community for 30 years. He was the head of the FSB directorate for the Novosibirsk Oblast before becoming in charge of counter intelligence as the deputy director of the FSB from 1997 to 2000. Pechenkin supported Deripaska when Deripaska obtained billions in Russian money from Minatom's uranium deals. He then started working for Deripaska and Deripaska's SibAl. Valery Pechenkin headed the security services of the Mikhail, Lev, and David Cherneys-Deripaska-Makhmudov-Tokhtakhunov and the Sergei Aksyonov (Russian: Сергей Аксёнов), Sergei Popov (Russian: Сергей Попов), and Anton Malevsky (Russian: Антон Малевский) associated Izmaylovskaya and Podolskaya Bratvas. Pechenkin has former heads of both the FSB and the Ministry of Internal Affairs (Russian: Министерство внутренних дел) working in these private security services.)

== Operations ==
=== Energy and mining sector ===
En+ Group is Russia-based diversified mining, metals, and energy group. En+ Group holds:

- a 47.41% stake in alumina and aluminium producer UC RUSAL
- a 100% stake in EuroSibEnergo PLC power company
- a 100% in Strikeforce Mining and Resources Ltd (SMR) (ferromolybdenum producer)
- a 100% in En+ Downstream (includes aluminium downstream assets)
- a 100% in En+ Coal
- Central European Aluminium Company (CEAC), which has run the Kombinat Aluminijuma Podgorica (KAP) aluminium smelter in Montenegro, and the Rudnic Boxita Niksic bauxite mine, which supplies raw materials for the smelter, since 2005.
- Dmitrov Pilot Plant for Aluminium Canning Tape (DOZAKL) strip with a polished surface for the manufacture of lamplight reflectors and lath ceilings.

=== Machine building sector ===
JSC Russian Machines was established in 2005 to unite Basic Element's machine building assets.

=== Airport management ===
Basel Aero, a joint venture between the Singaporean Changi Airports International, Basic Element, Sochi International Airport and the Russian Sberbank, is a company-operator of airports in Sochi, Krasnodar, and Anapa. As of 2015 the company handles 9.5% of total passenger traffic and 3.5% of the total cargo traffic in Russia.

==== Basel Aero Airports ====
- Sochi Airport
- Krasnodar Airport
- Anapa Airport

=== Financial services sector ===
Basic Element has been managing Oleg Deripaska's personal stake in the amount of 10% of Ingosstrakh's ordinary shares.

=== Construction sector ===
JSC Glavstroy is a vertically integrated construction holding corporation. Management functions are carried out by Glavstroy-Management.

=== Other businesses ===
==== Agribusiness ====
- Kuban AgroHolding
- AquaDin (LLC), manufacturer of non-alcoholic beverages
- Voskhod Stud Farm

==== Port business ====
- Imeretinsky Port, Sochi

==== Real estate ====
- BasEl Real Estate

== Owners and management ==
The owner of the "Basic Element" is entrepreneur Oleg Deripaska. Legally most of the assets of the companies included in the "Basic Element" belong to one degree or another to Basic Element Ltd (registered on the island of Jersey), which is 100% owned by A-Finance, a company registered in the British Virgin Islands, the beneficiary of which is Deripaska.

CEO is Valery Pechenkin.
