= Aeromist-Kharkiv Flight 2137 =

2002 aviation accident

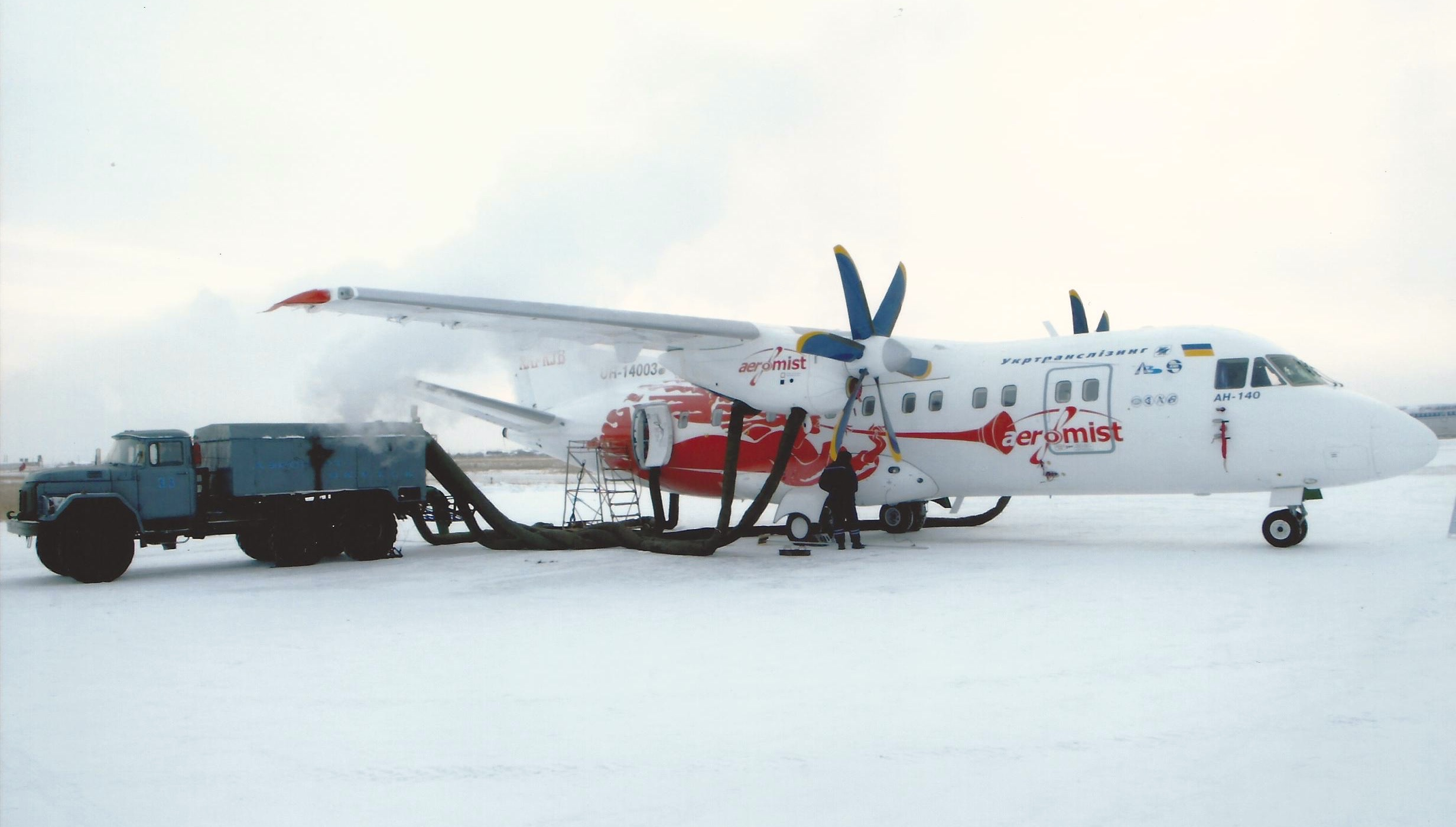
- UR-14003, the aircraft involved in the accident, seen two weeks before the crash

Accident
- Date: 23 December 2002
- Summary: Crashed into mountain on landing approach
- Site: Near Ardestan, Iran

Aircraft
- Aircraft type: Antonov An-140
- Operator: Aeromist-Kharkiv
- IATA flight No.: HT2137
- ICAO flight No.: AHW2137
- Call sign: AEROMIST 2137
- Registration: UR-14003
- Flight origin: Kharkiv International Airport, Ukraine
- Destination: Isfahan International Airport, Iran
- Occupants: 44
- Passengers: 38
- Crew: 6
- Fatalities: 44
- Survivors: 0

On 23 December 2002, an Antonov An-140 crashed near Ardestan, Iran, killing everyone on board. The crash, with 44 fatalities, killed a number of Russian and Ukrainian aviation specialists.

== Crash ==
The aircraft was en route from Kharkiv in Ukraine to Isfahan in Iran, having stopped in Trabzon, Turkey to refuel. It hit high ground on a night-time descent to Isfahan International Airport, killing all on board. The passengers, including several Russian and Ukrainian specialists and officials, were headed for the official inauguration of Iran's version of another Antonov plane, the An-140 commuter airliner, which is licensed by the Antonov design bureau. Iranian officials at first said they believed pilot error was the cause of the crash, but later said it was too early to determine what caused the accident. A short summary of the report was published on the Flight Global website.

== Investigation ==
The aircraft's flight data recorder was recovered and the initial investigation into the crash stated that the primary cause was due to "procedural navigation errors by the crew". The Commonwealth of Independent States' Interstate Aviation Committee report concluded that the main causes of the crash were poor crew management, failing to apply approach procedures, and incorrect use of the aircraft's GPS satellite navigation system, in breach of its operational requirements and their rating for its use on approach; failure to use information from other installed navigation equipment; failure to seek an alternative approach when they realised the GPS could not be giving a realistic distance measuring equipment readout.

== See also ==
- Azerbaijan Airlines Flight 217
