= Sepahan Airlines =

IATA	ICAO	Call sign
H8	SPN	SEPAHAN
- Founded: 2010
- Ceased operations: 2014
- Operating bases: Isfahan International Airport
- Parent company: HESA

Sepahan Airlines (Persian: هواپيمايي سپاهان, Havâpeymâyi-ye Sepâhân) was an airline based in Isfahan, Iran.

== History ==
The company has been an internal division of the manufacturer Iran Aircraft Manufacturing Industrial Company (HESA) and operated a fleet of 6 HESA-assembled Antonov An-140 turboprop aircraft. Following the 10 August 2014 crash, the entire IrAn-140 fleet in Iran was grounded, pending the outcome of the investigation, ultimately leading to the indefinite cessation of all Sepahan Airlines operations as it owned no other type of aircraft.

== Fleet ==
The Sepahan Airlines fleet consisted of the following aircraft:

Aircraft	In service	Orders	Notes
HESA IrAn-140	6	—	1 lost as Flight 5915
Total	6	—	

== Accidents and incidents ==
On 10 August 2014, a HESA IrAn-140 operating flight SPN 5915 to Tabas crashed near Tehran Mehrabad International Airport, killing at least 39 passengers. The plane had taken off from the airport moments earlier at 9:45 hours local time (0515 UTC), before at least one of its engines failed.
