= Aeromist-Kharkiv =

Ukrainian airline

| IATA | ICAO | Call sign |
|---|---|---|
| HT | AHW | AEROMIST |
- Founded: 2002
- Ceased operations: 2007
- Operating bases: Kharkiv International Airport
- Headquarters: Kharkiv, Ukraine
- Website: www.aeromost.com (defunct)

Aeromist-Kharkiv (Ukrainian: Аероміст-Харків) or Aeromost-Kharkov (Russian: Аэромост-Харьков) was an airline headquartered in Kharkiv, Ukraine, operating scheduled and chartered regional flights out of its base at Kharkiv International Airport using a fleet of up to three Antonov An-140 aircraft, the first ones of that type to enter commercial airline service (registered UR-14002, UR-14003 and UR-14004). The company was established on 6 June 2002 under Pavlo Naumenko's initiative (then president of InterAMI). It ceased operations in June 2007 (at that time, the website was shut down).

== Destinations ==
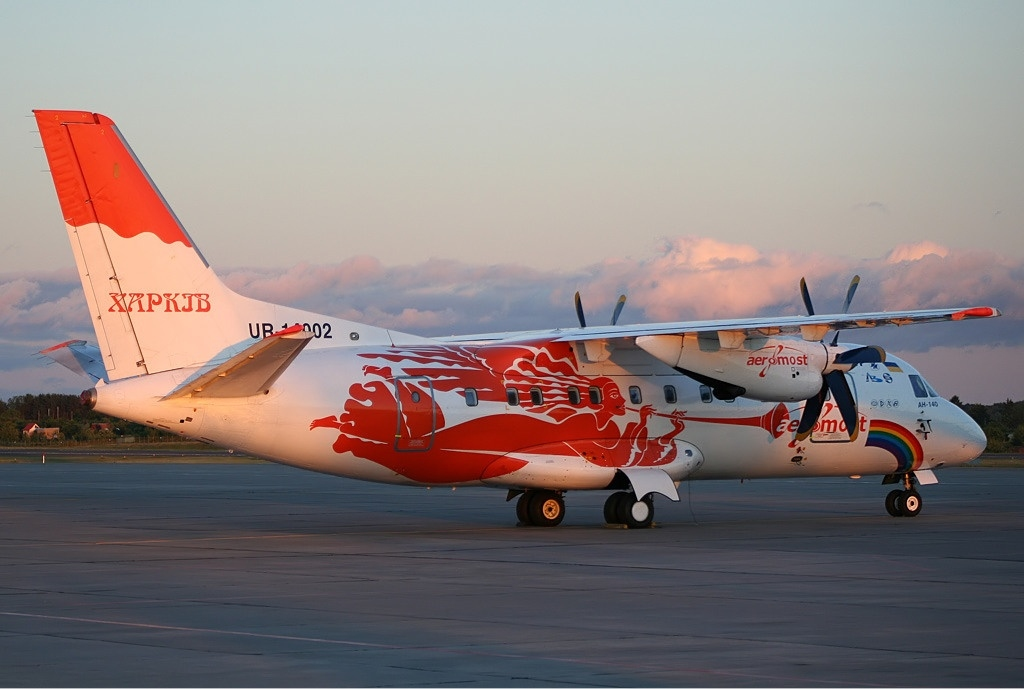
An Antonov An-140 of Aeromist at Gdańsk Lech Wałęsa Airport in 2005

Aeromist offered scheduled passenger flights to the following destinations:

Armenia

- Yerevan - Zvartnots International Airport

Georgia

- Batumi - Batumi International Airport

Russia

- Moscow - Domodedovo International Airport

Slovakia

- Bratislava - M. R. Štefánik Airport

Ukraine

- Kharkiv - Kharkiv International Airport (base)
- Kyiv - Kyiv International Airport (Zhuliany)

== Accidents and incidents ==
On 23 December 2002 at 19:29 local time, an Aeromist Antonov An-140 (registered UR-14003) crashed into a mountain near Isfahan, Iran, whilst approaching Isfahan International Airport in poor visibility conditions. The aircraft had been operating Flight 2137, a chartered service from Kharkiv to Isfahan with a refueling stop at Trabzon Airport, carrying 38 passengers (all of which were Antonov employees heading for a test flight of the HESA IrAn-140) and six crew members, none of whom survived. It was later determined that the most probable reason for the crash was the flawed usage of the onboard GPS by the pilots. The accident marked the first, and to date the worst accident involving an aircraft of that type.
