= Sepahan Airlines Flight 5915 =

2014 aviation accident in Iran

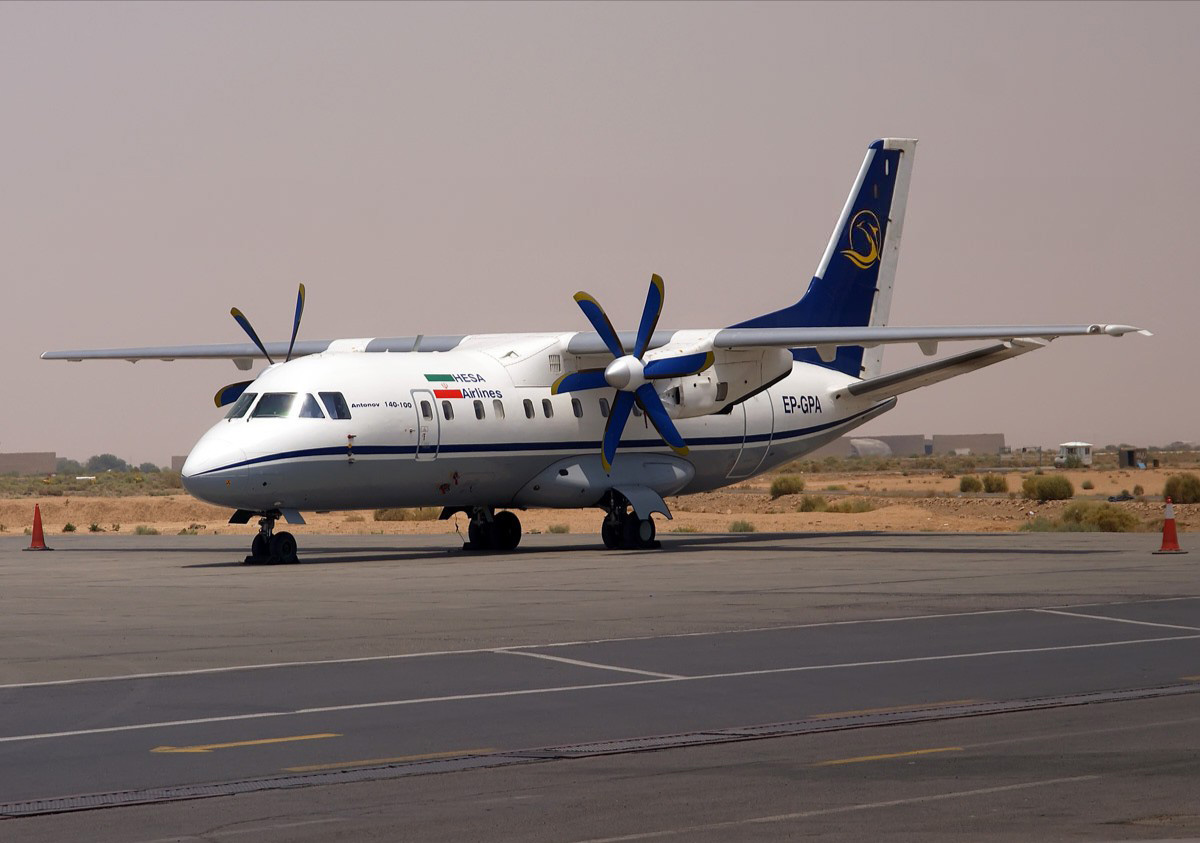
- EP-GPA, the aircraft involved in the accident, pictured in 2011

Accident
- Date: 10 August 2014
- Summary: Mishandled engine failure on take-off, pilot error and overloading leading to crash
- Site: Mina Glass Boulevard, near Mehrabad International Airport, Tehran, Iran; 35°42′25.51″N 51°16′55.79″E

Aircraft
- Aircraft type: HESA IrAn-140
- Operator: Sepahan Airlines
- IATA flight No.: H85915
- ICAO flight No.: SPN5915
- Call sign: SEPAHAN 5915
- Registration: EP-GPA
- Flight origin: Mehrabad International Airport, Tehran, Iran
- Destination: Tabas Airport, Tabas, Iran
- Occupants: 48
- Passengers: 42
- Crew: 6
- Fatalities: 40
- Injuries: 8
- Survivors: 8

Sepahan Airlines Flight 5915 was a scheduled domestic passenger flight from Iranian capital Tehran Mehrabad International Airport to Tabas, South Khorasan province, Iran. On 10 August 2014, the HESA IrAn-140 twin turboprop serving the flight crashed shortly after takeoff from Mehrabad International Airport, falling into a boulevard near the Azadi Stadium. Of the 42 passengers and six crew on board, 40 people died.

Iran's Civil Aviation Organization mainly attributed the crash to mechanical error. The aircraft suffered a malfunction on one of its engines shortly after take-off. Mismanagement of the emergency by the crew caused the aircraft to lose altitude rapidly, causing it to crash onto a boulevard. Subsequently, investigators also blamed the confusing Aircraft Flight Manual (AFM) that caused the crew to over-estimate the maximum take-off weight.

== Accident ==
Sepahan Airlines Flight 5915 was scheduled to fly to Tabas, a major city in South Khorasan province from Iranian capital Tehran. The aircraft was carrying 42 passengers and 6 crew members. 2 Sepahan Airlines off-duty mechanics were listed as passengers. Flight 5915 took off from Tehran's Mehrabad International Airport from Runway 29L at 09:22 a.m local time.

Just 2 seconds prior to its rotation, a malfunction occurred on the right engine. The crew immediately declared an emergency and asked to return to the airport with an immediate left turn. As the co-pilot kept reporting on the engine failure to the tower, the aircraft stalled. It kept descending rapidly to the right. The right wing then contacted trees and the ground.

The aircraft crashed onto trees and broke into pieces. It crashed in a residential block near Mina Glass Boulevard in western Tehran. The impact ruptured the fuel lines, causing the aircraft to erupt in flames. The engines and the wings detached. The aircraft then hit a concrete wall on the side of the boulevard and exploded. The tail of the aircraft then flung onto the boulevard.

The airport's emergency response team was immediately notified. However, due to miscommunication and poor coordination, the team didn't reach the crash site in a timely manner. At least 11 passengers were extricated alive from the wreckage and were taken to local hospitals, all of whom were in serious condition. 3 passengers later succumbed to their injuries, leaving only 8 survivors. A total of 40 passengers and crews were killed in the crash. At least another three persons on the ground also received burns and were taken to hospitals.

== Aircraft ==
The aircraft, an Antonov An-140, was manufactured in 2008 and was completed in Isfahan with a serial number of 90–05. It was registered to Sepahan Airlines with a registration code of EP-GPA. At the time of the accident, the aircraft had accrued a total of 1,370 flight hours and 1058 hours of flight cycles. The aircraft was equipped with two engines. The left engine was manufactured in 2007 and had accrued a total of 1,311 cycles. The right engine was manufactured in 2004 and had accrued a total of 1,329 cycles.

The Antonov An-140 (upon which the HESA IrAn-140 is based) is a relatively recent development, with knock-down kits being delivered for domestic Iranian assembly as recently as 2007.

== Passengers and crew ==
There were 42 passengers and a crew of six. Of the 42 passengers, 36 were adults and six were children. 34 passengers and all six crew members were killed in the accident.

The pilot flying was 63-year-old Captain Nazarali Izadpanah. (Note: Persian: نظرعلی ایزدپناه) had accumulated a total of more than 9,400 hours of flying, including 2,000 hours as a pilot on the Antonov An-140. He held a certificate for flying the Antonov An-140 since May 2014. Examination on the medical records revealed that he had no medical limitations and that he was not fatigued during the crash.

The pilot monitoring was 32-year-old Captain Amir Barghian. (Note: Persian: امير برقيان) and had accumulated a total flying time of 572 hours, 400 of which were on the Antonov An-140. He began his transition training as a Captain of Antonov An-140 in September 2005. Documents revealed that he was well-rested during the crash.

== Investigation ==
=== Right engine failure ===
Survivors recalled that the right engine of the aircraft malfunctioned during its take-off. Analysis on the aircraft's logbook revealed that numerous errors and failures had been recorded on the right engine. In April 2014, at least 2 engine failures were recorded. On 23 April and 24 April, while en route to Bandar Abbas, the right engine failed during the aircraft's cruising stage. On 28 April, the engine failure warning light was illuminated for a short time. On 29 April, during the inspection on both engines, a corrosion on the left engine's compressor blade was discovered by ground crews.

Just 3 days before the crash, on 7 August, during its flight from Tabriz to Isfahan, a violent shaking was recorded on the right engine. The FDR recorded this shaking and the warning alarm was triggered. A sensor replacement was conducted to eliminate the problem. However, after the replacement there was a difference in the shaking of the right engine and the left engine, which was deemed by investigators as unreliable. Investigators stated that the replacement was improperly installed by crews.

Further investigation revealed that the right engine failure was caused by a malfunction on the aircraft's fuel supply system. The fuel lines to the combustion chamber was cut off, causing it to fail. This was caused by a malfunction on the aircraft's electronic engine control (known as SAY-2000) The SAY-2000 didn't work as expected, in which the system caused a 17 seconds delay on the feathering of the aircraft. After 17 seconds, the feather pump was switched on and the aircraft's system finally detected the failing right engine and began the propeller feathering.

Investigators noted that the flight crews immediately detected the right engine failure approximately 5 seconds after the failure, whereas the warnings occurred only 14 seconds later.

Reports on previous studies on the Antonov An-140's SAY-2000 system revealed that there had been some modifications on the software of the system. This was due to the fact that previous occurrences revealed that the system had caused numerous engine failures with a rate that was above the acceptable level. The modifications were not effective as the failure rate was not reduced to acceptable level.

=== Further findings ===
The investigation also revealed that the aircraft had been overloaded. This was due to the Aircraft Flight Manual (AFM) that was not clear and was deemed as confusing by investigators. It was suspected that the AFM confused the pilot during their calculations on the maximum take-off weight, which caused an over-estimation on the weight by 190 kg. The aircraft's fuel was also 500 kg more than the required amount. The investigation also revealed that the aircraft didn't take off at the supposed take-off speed. Instead of taking off at the supposed 224 km/h, the crew elected to take off at a speed of 219 km/h. According to the accident investigation report, after boarding passengers from east to west (Azadi - Karaj), the pilot operates the takeoff process and after 2 minutes the right engine, so-called flight engine, "goes out" and fails. At the same time, the plane tilts to the right and the control tower orders the pilot to turn left (counterclockwise and towards the live engine) and enter Mehrabad from the direction of the Kan River. However, the pilot mistakenly turns towards the dead engine and does not execute the command. At these moments, he raises the nose of the plane more than allowed, which causes the plane to slow down and approach a stall. He intended to increase altitude, but his previous mistakes, such as not retracting the landing gear, taking off at a low and inappropriate speed, and adding the load and fuel he had accepted, did not allow him to continue this process, and therefore the pilot stalled his plane and hit a high-voltage power cable, which led to the tail of the plane separating and the tank exploding.

=== Final report ===
It was later determined that multiple factors had contributed to the accident. The aircraft was overloaded by 2,666 kilograms (5,878 lb), and was not properly trimmed for takeoff. The stabilizer should have been trimmed upwards between zero and six degrees, however the trim setting used during the accident flight was two degrees downwards. The rudder trim had not been centered. The flaps, which were supposed to be set at 15 degrees, were set only at ten degrees. During the takeoff roll, a malfunction in the electronic fuel delivery system caused a loss of power in the right engine. Two seconds later, although rotation speed had not yet been reached, the captain brought the plane into the air. Shortly afterwards, the crew noticed the engine failure but did not immediately attempt to feather the propeller. The plane began to lose airspeed, reaching a maximum height of 40 metres (130 ft) before descending and eventually entering an aerodynamic stall. By the time the crew feathered the propeller, 17 seconds after the initial failure, it was too late to recover the plane, which impacted a highway 1.6 kilometres (0.99 mi; 0.86 nmi) from the end of the runway. The final investigation concludes:

The accident investigation team determined that the main cause of this accident was combination of:

1. Electronic engine control (SAY-2000) failure simultaneously with engine No: 2 shutdown, just about 2 seconds before aircraft lift-off.
2. AFM Confusing performance chart resulted the pilots relying on performance calculation that, significantly over-estimate the aircraft MTOM.
