= HESA Simourgh =

Iranian light transport aircraft

- Simourgh prototype in 2022

General information
- Type: light transport aircraft
- Manufacturer: HESA
- Status: In serial production
- Number built: 3
- Total hours: 100 hrs

History
- Introduction date: 2023
- First flight: 30 May 2023
- In service: 2023-present
- Developed from: IrAn-140

HESA Simourgh, sometimes known as Simorgh (Persian: هسا سیمرغ) is an Iranian light transport aircraft unveiled on 19 May 2022. It is a variation of the IrAn-140 turboprop airliner, which evolved from the An-140. It is a general-purpose cargo plane and can carry troops or goods.

For commercial operations, the Simourgh is undergoing testing, and is expected to enter full operational service in 2027.

The Simorgh name was also used for an iranian built two-seat trainer Northrop F-5A to F-5B conversion.

== Development ==
According to Iranian official sources, the airplane is a modified version of the IrAn-140, which addresses some deficiencies of that design. According to pictures of the prototype Simourgh, there have been some changes to the wings, tail and fuselage compared to the IrAn-140 (the most notable difference being the cargo ramp added to the back of the aircraft).

The first prototype of this aircraft was first unveiled on 19 May 2022 by Iranian official news. According to military officials the plane was in the fast-taxi testing phase.

On 29 April 2023, a picture was published that showed the prototype version doing the fast-taxi test on the runway. On 30 May 2023, Iranian Ministry Of Defense reported that the aircraft has successfully had its first flight.

In December 2024, the Simorgh aircraft participated in various flights at the Kish Airshow in the Persian Gulf, featuring a new paint scheme.

On 29 October 2025, the Simourgh has completed 100 hours of flight time to get airworthiness certification from the Civil Aviation Organization (CAO).

== Design ==
=== General characteristics ===
As said earlier this aircraft is based on the IrAn-140 and shares lots of characteristics with it. The aircraft is 23m long, 25m wide (with wings) and 8m tall. It can carry 6 tons of cargo, has a range of 3900 km and has a max speed of 533 km/h. Simourgh is suitable for transporting cargo (Including 463L standard pallets, light vehicles and aircraft engines), evacuation of injured people (Able to carry 24 stretchers) or carry paratroopers. The minimum runway length needed for takeoff is 1450m and for landing is 900m.

=== Difference with IrAn-140 ===
Despite IrAn-140 which has trapezius-shaped wings, this aircraft has rectangular wings to give it more lift. Also the horizontal stabilisers went from V-shaped to completely horizontal. the back part of fuselage has also been modified. But the most notable difference is the cargo ramp added to HESA Simourgh.

=== Engine ===
HESA Simourgh is powered by two TV3-117 turboprop engines (probably reverse-engineered and modified version).

== Specifications ==
Data from

General characteristics

- Crew: 2
- Capacity: 52 pax / 6,000 kg (13,228 lb) max payload
- Length: 23 m (75 ft 6 in)
- Wingspan: 25 m (82 ft 0 in)
- Height: 8.225 m (27 ft 0 in)
- Max takeoff weight: 21,500 kg (47,399 lb)
- Powerplant: 2 × Klimov TV3-117VMA-SBM1 turboprop engines, 1,838 kW (2,465 hp) each
- Propellers: 6-bladed, 3.6 m (11 ft 10 in) diameter constant-speed fully feathering reversible propellers

Performance

- Cruise speed: 533 km/h (331 mph, 288 kn) at 7,200 m (23,622 ft) max
- Economical cruise speed: 500 km/h (310 mph; 270 kn) at 7,200 m (23,622 ft)
- Range: 900 km (560 mi, 490 nmi) with 6,000 kg (13,228 lb) payload at econ. cruise
- Service ceiling: 7,200 m (23,600 ft)
- Balanced field length: 1,450 m (4,757 ft)

Avionics
weather radar

== See also ==
Related development

- Antonov An-140

Aircraft of comparable role, configuration, and era

- EADS CASA C-295
