= Safiran Airlines =

Safiran Airlines هواپیمايی سفیران
IATA	ICAO	Call sign
-	SFN	SAFIRAN
- Founded: 1988
- Ceased operations: 2013
- Hubs: Mehrabad International Airport
- Fleet size: 4
- Destinations: 14
- Parent company: Iran National Airlines Corporation
- Headquarters: Tehran, Iran
- Website: http://www.safiranair.com

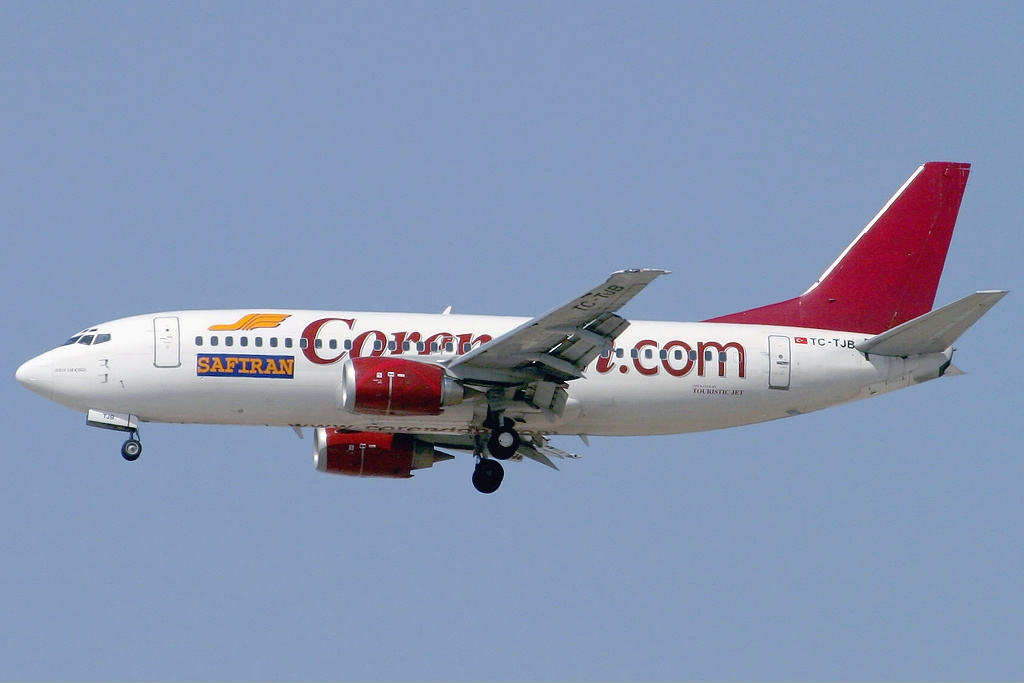
Safiran Airlines Boeing 737-300

Safiran Airlines (Persian: هواپیمايی سفیران, Havâpeymâyi-ye Safirân) was a cargo airline based in Tehran, Iran. It specialised in international cargo flights on a charter basis, especially outsized cargo, handling and wet-leasing aircraft when required.

== History ==
The airline was established in 1988 and started operations in 1990. It was owned by M. A. Habibian and family (30%), M. B. Nahvi and family (30%), M. J. Nahvi and family (25%) and other shareholders (15%). The management structure is as follows:

- Chairman: M. B. Nahvi
- Managing Director: M. A. Habibian
- VP Technical Support: Kamal Bakhshi

== Fleet ==
As of March 2008 the Safiran Airlines fleet includes:

- 3 Antonov An-140
- 1 Boeing 737

== Accidents ==
- On 12 August 2005, a Safiran Airlines HESA IrAn-140 diverted to Arak Airport due to an engine failure. During landing, the aircraft overran the runway and was badly damaged. There were no fatalities. The cause of the engine failure appeared to be technical problems with the fuel control unit. The airframe was eventually repaired in the early 2010s and is to be used by HESA as a test bed for the future versions of the aircraft. After the Arak incident, Safiran Airlines returned its two remaining examples to HESA.
