= Nikšić mine =

Bauxite mine in Montenegro

Rudnici boksita Nikšić
- Location: Nikšić Municipality, Nikšić, Montenegro
- Products: Bauxite
- Production: 1,200,000.00 tonnes of bauxite
- Financial year: 2009
- Opened: 1948

The Rudnici boksita Nikšić is a large mine located in the Central - Western part of Montenegro in Nikšić Municipality 55 km North - West of the capital, Podgorica. Nikšić represents the largest bauxite reserve in Montenegro and one of the largest in Europe, having estimated reserves of 135.2 million tonnes.
