= Azerbaijan Airlines Flight 217 =

2005 aviation accident

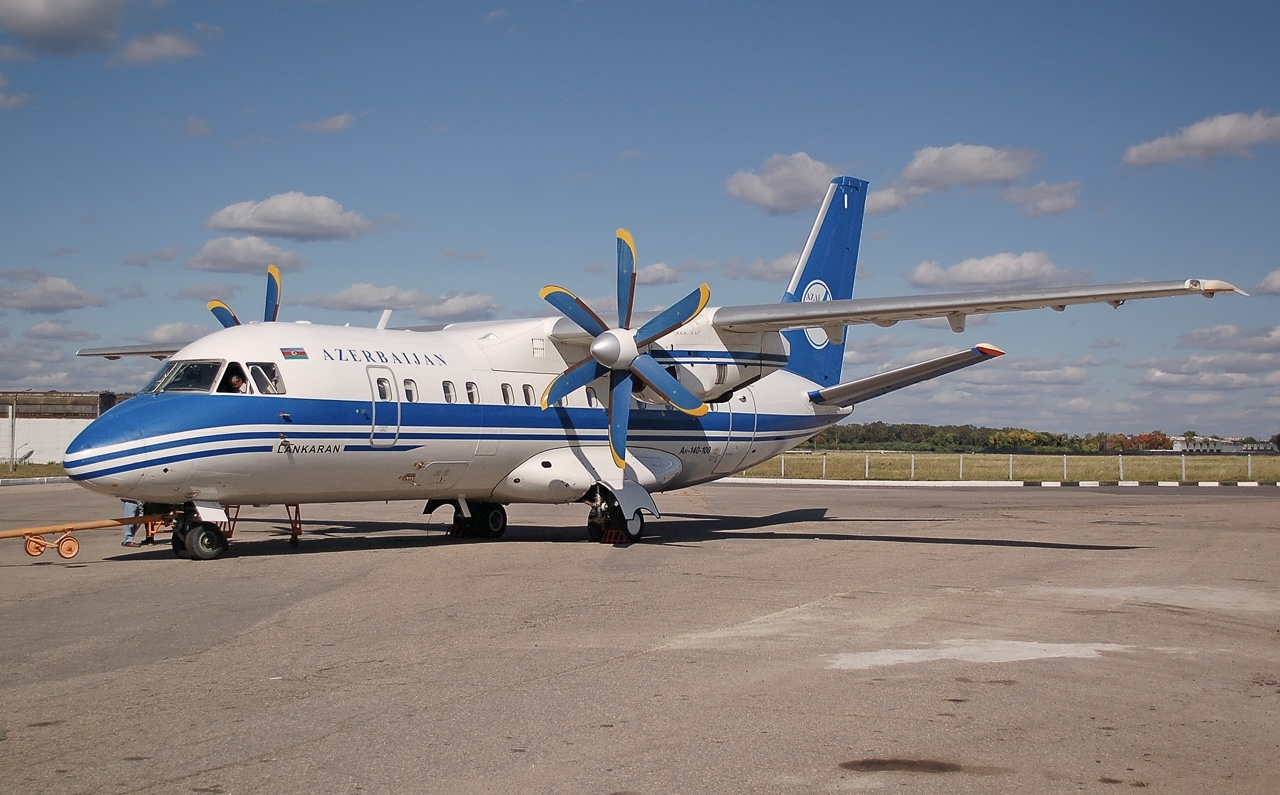
- 4K-AZ48, the aircraft involved in the accident, pictured in 2003

Accident
- Date: 23 December 2005
- Summary: Controlled flight into water
- Site: Caspian Sea, near Nardaran, Azerbaijan; 40°35′22.1″N 50°02′03.2″E

Aircraft
- Aircraft type: Antonov An-140-100
- Aircraft name: Yevlakh
- Operator: Azerbaijan Airlines
- IATA flight No.: J2217
- ICAO flight No.: AHY217
- Call sign: AZAL 217
- Registration: 4K-AZ48
- Flight origin: Baku Airport, Azerbaijan
- Destination: Aktau Airport, Kazakhstan
- Occupants: 23
- Passengers: 18
- Crew: 5
- Fatalities: 23
- Survivors: 0

Azerbaijan Airlines Flight 217 was a scheduled passenger flight between Baku and Aktau, Kazakhstan that crashed into the Caspian Sea at ca. 22:40 on 23 December 2005. The flight was operated by an Antonov An-140.

== Accident ==
Around five minutes after a night-time departure from Baku Airport, the crew reported a systems failure. Heading over the Caspian Sea at night without flight instruments made it difficult for the crew to judge their flight parameters. Whilst attempting to return to Baku, the aircraft crashed shortly afterwards on the shore of the Caspian Sea, killing all 23 passengers and crew on board.

== Aftermath ==
Azerbaijan Airlines suspended flights operated by its remaining Antonov An-140s and cancelled plans to order two more aircraft of the same make.

== Investigation ==
It seemed the aircraft had taken off "with caged gyro horizons". Investigations from the Kharkiv State Aircraft Manufacturing Company found that during the climb, the aircraft's three independent gyroscopes had failed and were not providing stabilised pitch, roll, heading, and altitude performance information to the crew.
