= Bezymyanka Airport =

Airport in Russia

Bezymyanka Безымянка
- IATA: local (Russian: СБЫ); ICAO: UWWG

Summary
- Airport type: experimental
- Operator: JSC Aviakor
- Location: Samara
- Elevation AMSL: 135 ft / 41 m
- Coordinates: 53°13′N 50°20′E
- Interactive map of Bezymyanka

Runways
Direction	Length		Surface
Direction	ft	m	Surface
02/20	9,186	2,800х45	Concrete

Bezymyanka Airport is an experimental aerodrome in the Aviakor aviation plant in the city of Samara, Russia. It is located 4 kilometres (2.5 mi) east of the Bezymyanka railroad station in the Kirov district of Samara, 12 kilometres (7.5 mi) east of the city center.

To the east of the airport, the Smyshlyaevka airport is located. To the south, the settlements Chkalov, Padovka, and the Samara River. To the north, the Aviakor aviation plant and the TsSKB-Progress plant.

The airport has a class 1 rating and can serve most airplane and helicopter types. The total runway length is 3,600 metres (11,800 ft).

Founded in 1942, the first runway utilized bricks as its pavement. After World War II, the aviation plants 1 and 18 were evacuated to Kuibyshev (now known as Samara), from Moscow and Voronezh. At the earliest possible date they set up the production of Il-2 aircraft.

In the second part of the 20th century, the airport served as the testing ground for a number of Tupolev, Ilyushin, and Antonov aircraft produced by the above-mentioned aviation plants.

Since 1958, plant 1 was redesigned for the production of space rockets and artificial satellites. The airport also started a charter transportation service to Baikonur and Plesetsk, which continue today. In 1980, the airport was used to transport components of the Energia rocket carrier to Baikonur on the VM-T aircraft in preparation for the Buran Shuttle flight. The runway was extended to a length of 3,600 metres (11,800 ft).

== See also ==
- List of airports in Russia
