= Pavlo Naumenko =

Ukrainian aerospace engineer (1965–2023)

- Ukrainian: Павло Олегович Науменко
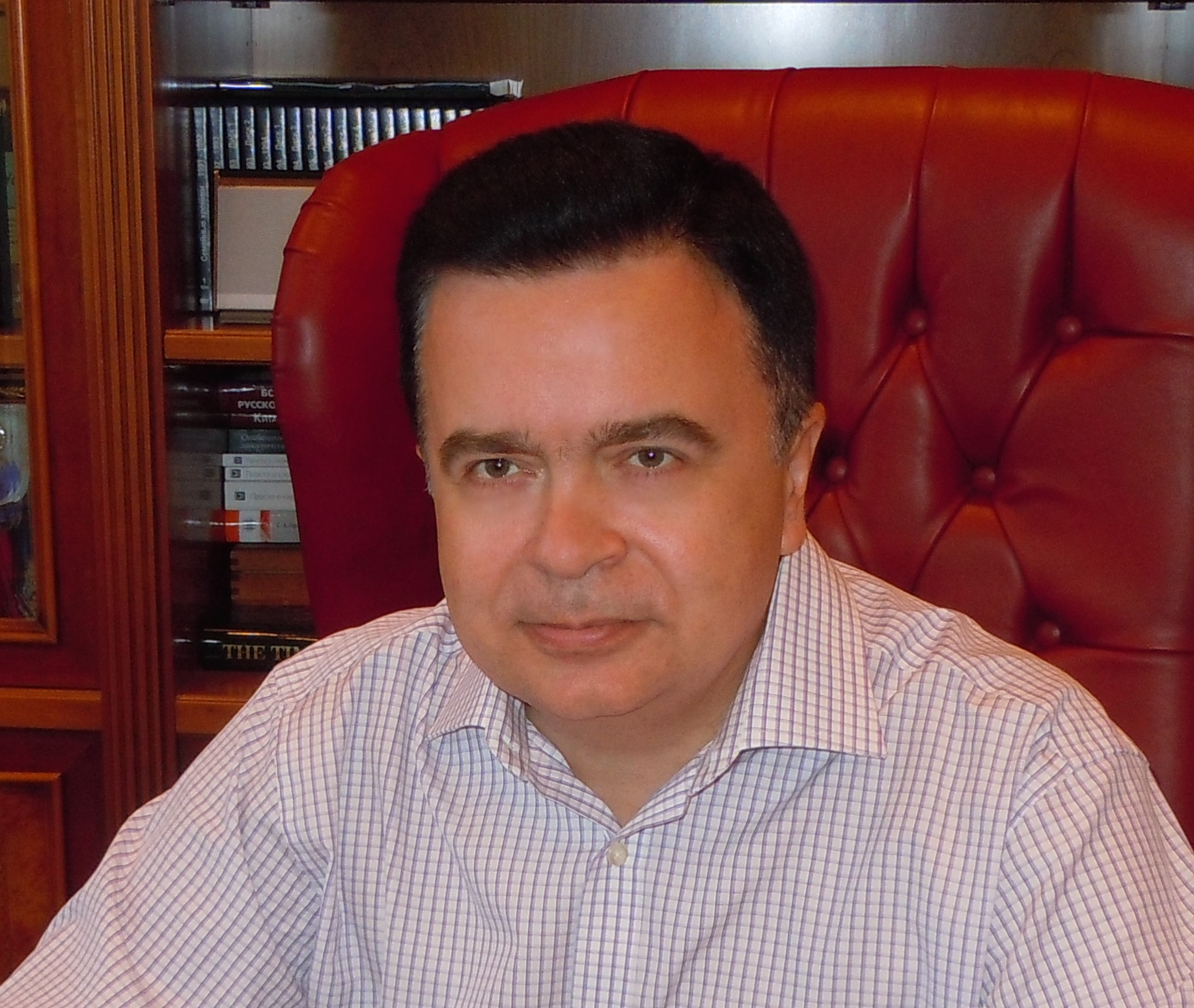
- Born: Pavlo Naumenko; 9 September 1965; Kyiv, Ukrainian SSR, USSR
- Died: 11 January 2023 (aged 57)
- Education: National Aerospace University – Kharkiv Aviation Institute (Graduated in 1988)
- Scientific career
- Thesis: Газодинамические тепловыделяющие энергоустановки летательных аппаратов для обеспечения безопасности полетов (2003)
- Website: www.naumenko.info

Pavlo Naumenko (Ukrainian: Павло Олегович Науменко; 9 September 1965 – 11 January 2023) was a Ukrainian aerospace engineer.

Naumenko was awarded the Best Employer of 2003 as the General Director of Kharkiv State Aircraft Manufacturing Company (KSAMC) in 2004. Laureate of "Aviation Week and Space Technology" (US) Award for successes on the international market in promotion of An-140 – first passenger aircraft designed and produced in the independent Ukraine. He held a Ukrainian PhD in Sciences, Full member (Academician) of the Engineering Academy of Ukraine docent of the National Aerospace University – Kharkiv Aviation Institute.

Naumenko was author of numerous academic works and inventions in the area of developing and manufacturing of piloted and unmanned aerial vehicles (UAV), which received Ukrainian, Russian and Iranian patents.

== Early life ==
Naumenko graduated from Klovskyi Lyceum in Kyiv, Ukraine in 1982 and went to National Aerospace University – Kharkiv Aviation Institute, having graduated with distinction in 1988 as an engineer-mechanic. He started to work as Master of the manufacturing site at the aggregate-assembly workshop of Kharkiv Aircraft Plant. At this period, KSAMC launched a series production of An-72 (first flight of the serial An-72 was on 20 December 1985). An-72 became the base for a whole new family of multi-purpose airplanes An-72 / 74 nicknamed as "Flying SUV" due to their unique flight characteristics, simplicity of service and capability to take off and land on poorly equipped runways.

== InterAMI ==
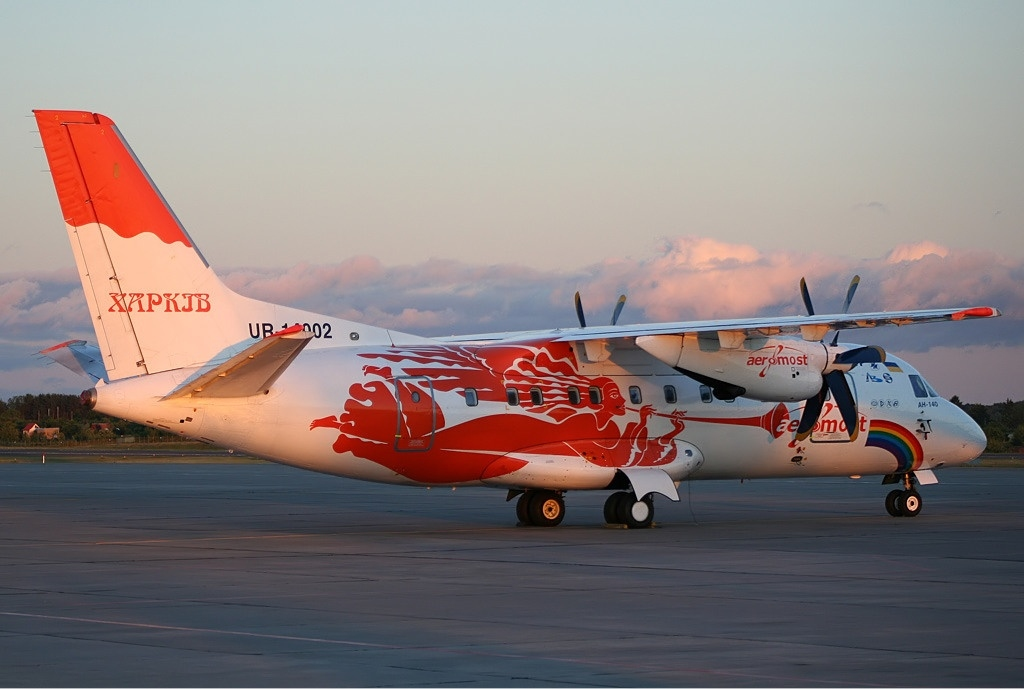
Aeromost Kharkiv Antonov An-140 Idaszak

In August 1990, on the eve of the collapse of the Soviet Union, Naumenko left KSAMC to set up a private engineering company InterAMI. The most famous projects of the company were joint production of Amitron TV sets with Samsung (1992–1995) and production of polymer products according to the technology of the German company ADM Isobloc (1994–2004). InterAMI restores its collaboration with KSAMC in 1996 the result of which was a specialized enterprise "KSAMC Trading House" for professional promotion of An-74 of different modifications on the international market, which enabled to implement a contract with the Government of Iran to deliver 12 An-74 aircraft in the middle of economic crisis in Ukraine. InterAMI sets up its engineering department InterAMI-Interior that designs and develops aircraft and helicopter interiors, particularly for An-74 and An-140 in 1999. "InterAMI-Interior" succeeded to radically change old-fashioned post-Soviet aircraft interiors on new technological Western types, which were more competitive on the market. Naumenko leads InterAMI in the process of setting up a new airline Aeromist-Kharkiv in 2002. It became one of the first airlines to use An-140 that this airline used until 2007 on domestic and international routes to the EU countries, Armenia, Azerbaijan and Russia. Aeromist-Kharkiv became an authorised company from KSAMC to exhibit An-140 during international air shows, such as Le Bourget Air Show, Farnborough Airshow, Dubai Air Show and others.

== Aerospace ==
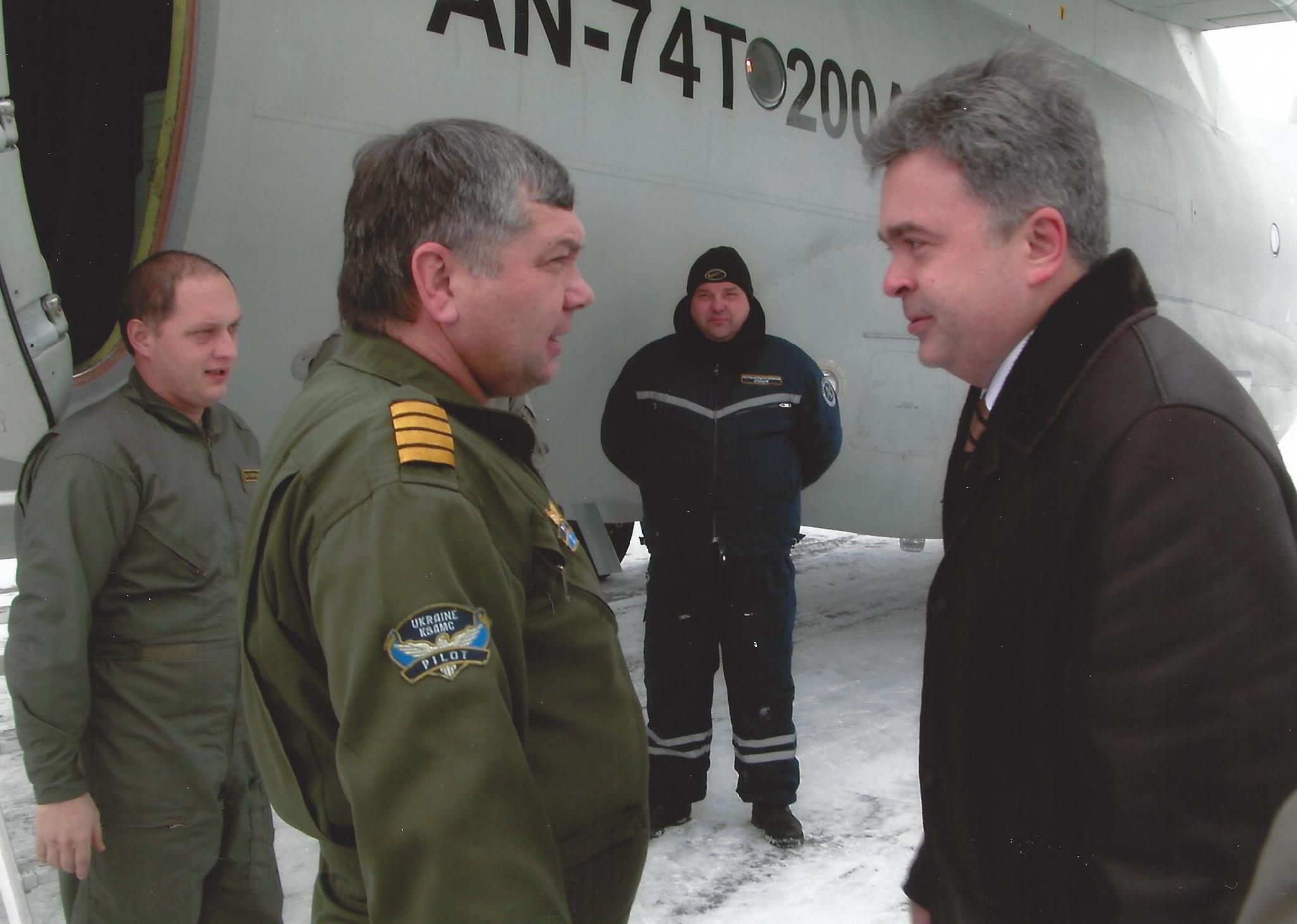
An-74T-200A first test flight (Kharkiv, December 2004)

From the late 1990s, Naumenko took part in the organisation of serial production of new An-140 and An-74TK-300 designed by "Antonov" Aeronautical Scientific Technical Complex. Starting from 2002 until 2007, Naumenko led a production process of the following aircraft modifications on KSAMC: regional An-140-100 (2004), business An-74TK-300D(2004), multi purpose An-74T-200A (2004–2005), business An-140 VIP(2004). Upon the Ministry of Transport of Ukraine's initiative, the first An-74TK-300D was given a special registry number that highlighted that presidents of Ukraine use an aircraft produced in Ukraine. After the aircraft was transferred in 2004 into the ownership of "Ukraine" State Enterprise, it acquired a registry number UR-LDK (L.D. Kuchma) and was later renamed as UR-YVA (Yushchenko V.A.). The number was changed to a neutral UR-AWB in 2012. The aircraft received an index of An-74T-200A in which "A" stands for "Arabic". It was linked with KSAMC's victory in a tender announced by the Government of Egypt to deliver three, and eventually six, aircraft of the Egyptian Air Force in 2003. An-74T-200A competed with C-27J Spartan (Lockheed Martin (US), Alenia Aeronautica (Italy)), EADS CASA C-295 (CASA (Spain) and Airbus Military (EU)). From 2012, Naumenko was a consultant for a number of EU companies on the UAVs based on piloted aircraft projects, using Fly-by-Wire or Fly-by-Optics control systems together with full authority digital engine control systems (FADEC).

== IT-projects ==
Naumenko supported and promoted a range of IT projects since 2014. One of them was DROTR – DROID TRANSLATOR represented as the most promising communicator with a capability of online translation on 29 languages. Since mid-2021, Naumenko was an Independent Consultant of Swiss startups YouGiver and vidby.

== Death ==
Naumenko died on 11 January 2023, at the age of 57.

== Recognition ==
Naumenko received various awards recognizing different areas including aerospace and philanthropy.

Ukrainian: Order of Merit (Ukraine) of II (2004) and of III (1999) classes; "For effective management" of the International Cadre Academy – 2001; "Kharkiv Resident" of the Year – 2001–2003; Honorary title "Social recognition" of ІІІ grade – 2002; "Best Employer of 2003 in Ukraine" award – 2004; Honorary badge of the Ministry of Internal Affairs of Ukraine – 2004; “For cooperation in ensuring safety of Ukraine's borders" Medal – 2003; “Sloboda glory" honorary badge of the chairman of Kharkiv Oblast Administration – 2003; «For efforts" badge of Kharkiv's Mayor – 2003; Medal of the National Olympic Committee of Ukraine – 2004; “Honor, Glory and Labour" St George's Silver medal – 2004;

- "Man of Year (2004)" in the nomination "Industrialist of the Year".

International: Winner of the "Aviation Week and Space Technology" (US) Award for successes in promotion of An-140 aircraft on the international market – 2004; Golden medal of Societe d'Encouragement pour L'industrie Nationale (SPI) – Association for promotion of French industries – 2003;

Orders of Ukrainian Orthodoxy: "Venerable Nestor the Chronicler" of I, II and III grades – 2003–2004, "Venerable Agapetus of Pechersk" of II and III grades – 2004–2005; Medal of "The Saint and Equal to Apostles Prince Vladimir" of I grade – 2005; Medal of "Saint Anthony and Feodosia of Pechersk" – 2006.
