= Ferromolybdenum =

Alloy of molybdenum and iron

Ferro molybdenum is an important iron-molybdenum metal alloy, with a molybdenum content of 60–75% It is the main source for molybdenum alloying of HSLA steel.

== Production ==
The alloy is produced by heating a mixture of molybdenum(VI) oxide MoO_{3}, aluminium, and iron. The oxide and the aluminium combine via an aluminothermic reaction to give molybdenum in situ. The ferromolybdenum can be purified by electron beam melting or used as it is. For alloying with steel the ferromolybdenum is added to molten steel before casting.
