= Antonov An-140 =

Twin-turboprop regional airliner by Antonov

An-140
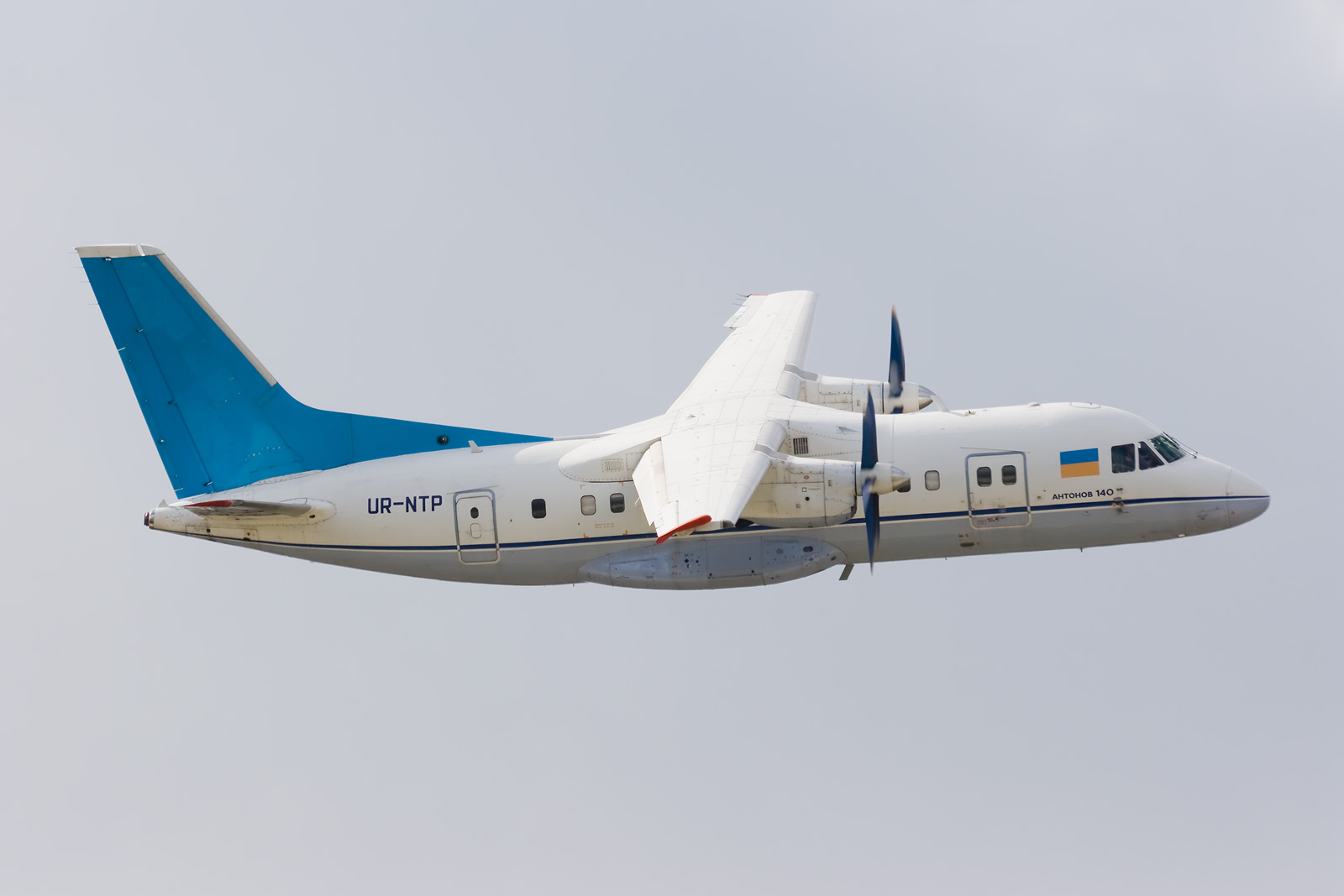
- Antonov An-140. Hostomel Airport, Ukraine, 2008

General information
- Type: Turboprop regional airliner
- Manufacturer: Antonov; Aviakor; HESA
- Designer: Antonov
- Status: In service
- Primary users: Ministry of Defense (Russia) Russian Naval Aviation; Motor Sich Airlines; Yakutia Airlines
- Number built: 33

History
- Manufactured: 1997–2016
- Introduction date: 2002
- First flight: 17 September 1997
- Developed into: HESA Simourgh

The Antonov An-140 is a turboprop regional airliner, designed by the Ukrainian Antonov ASTC bureau as a successor to the Antonov An-24, with extended cargo capacity and the ability to use unprepared airstrips.

== Design and development ==
First flown on 17 September 1997, the 52 passenger An-140 is manufactured at the main production line in Kharkiv by KHDABP, in Samara by Aviakor, and assembled under license by Iran Aircraft Manufacturing Industrial Company (HESA) in Iran as the IrAn-140. Assembly in Kazakhstan has also been discussed in tri-partite discussions between the Kazakh government, Ukraine and Russia.

Production in Kharkiv ended in 2005. In total 11 planes were manufactured.

Production in Isfahan ran from 2000 to 2015, made from Ukrainian and Iranian components. Iran has complained that Antonov did not fulfill its obligations on parts deliveries.

An identical-in-appearance airplane with the same name was also manufactured by Aviakor in Samara, Russia. Since Ukraine is no longer cooperating with Russia in aircraft production, the Aviakor version of the An-140 is manufactured entirely with Russian components. The P&W Canada engine option is not offered. In 2016 Aviakor produced its last An-140 and in 2017 delivered it to the customer.

== Variants ==
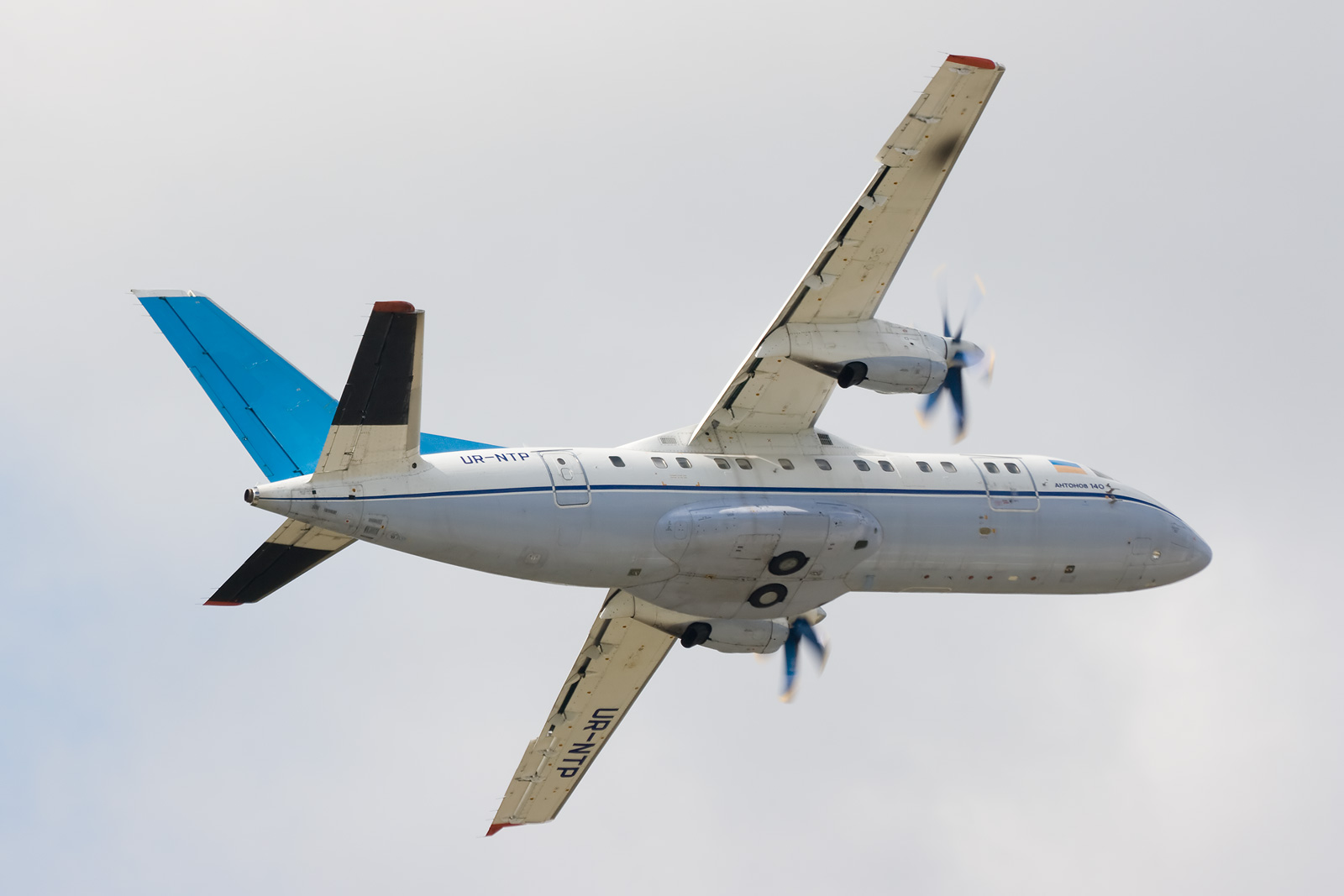
Antonov An-140

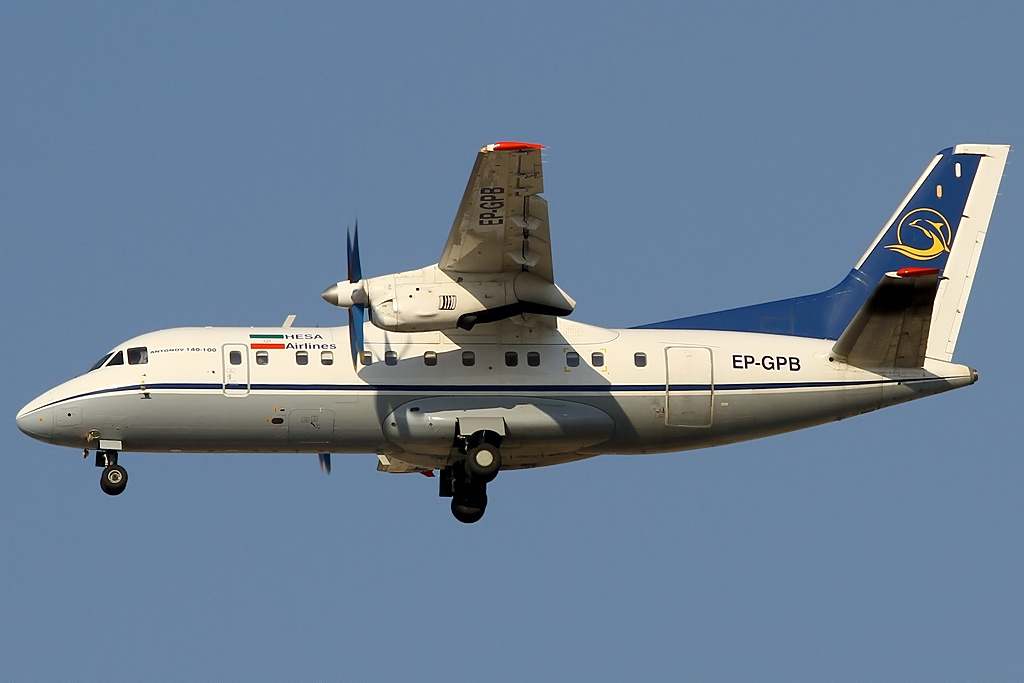
HESA IrAn-140-100

An-140T (Tactical airlifter)
The An-140T is a light military transport aircraft developed on the basis of the An-140-100 turboprop airliner. The An-140T features a rear ramp for loading/unloading of cargo and personnel. The An-140S is the same military transport aircraft equipped with a larger loading/unloading hatch. In 2013 Aviakor announced the first deliveries of the An-140T/S aircraft to the Russian Ministry of Defense were scheduled for 2017 as the replacement for the current fleet of 300 An-24 and An-26 airplanes operated by the Russian Aerospace Forces. However, in 2014, Russian deputy prime minister for military–industrial complex, Dmitry Rogozin, announced that Russia was abandoning the An-140T/S project due to worsening relations with Ukraine and would pursue development of the Ilyushin Il-112.

An-140TK (convertible cargo-passenger)

An-140 VIP
Regional aircraft An-140 in VIP-configuration is designed to carry up to 30 passengers in comfort. The passenger compartment of the aircraft can be divided into two or three zones—the exclusive lounge, equipped with four comfortable seats with audio and video, business class and economy class cabin, in which it has 24 standard seats with a standard aisle.

An-140-100
The AN-140-100 aircraft differs from the basic version with the larger wingspan. Can be built for civilian, military and special purpose: maritime patrol, medical, aerial photography, geological exploration, freight etc.

HESA IrAn-140
The IrAn-140 is a license-built version of the An-140, assembled by HESA in Shahin Shahr, Iran, from complete knock-down kits supplied by Antonov. As of 2008, 13 aircraft per year were planned to be constructed. There were plans to produce maritime patrol (IrAn-140MP) and freighter (IrAn-140T) versions. 100 aircraft in total were planned to be built; 20 of them were to be acquired by the Iranian government for border patrol and surveillance.

On 9 November 2010, during his opening speech of the Kish air show, the Iranian transport minister announced that 14 IrAn-140 aircraft had so far been completed; the first six entered commercial service on 19 February 2011. However, after the Sepahan Airlines Flight 5915 crash, An-140 operations were banned by the Civil Aviation Organisation of Iran, with all remaining Iranian-registered examples grounded. On 23 August 2014 Brigadier General Hossein Dehqan, Iran's Minister of Defence, announced full compliance of IrAn-140 airplanes with ICAO requirements and that the aircraft is certified by Iran's Civil Aviation Organisation.

=== HESA Simourgh ===
On 19 May 2022, a transport plane based on An-140/IrAn-140 was unveiled by Iran. The plane is named the Simourgh and can carry cargo up to 6 tonnes or troops. According to Iranian officials, this plane is a modified version of the Iranian IrAn-140 plane and its previous problems are solved. There are some changes in the tail, wings and the body of the plane and it also has a cargo ramp.

== Operators ==
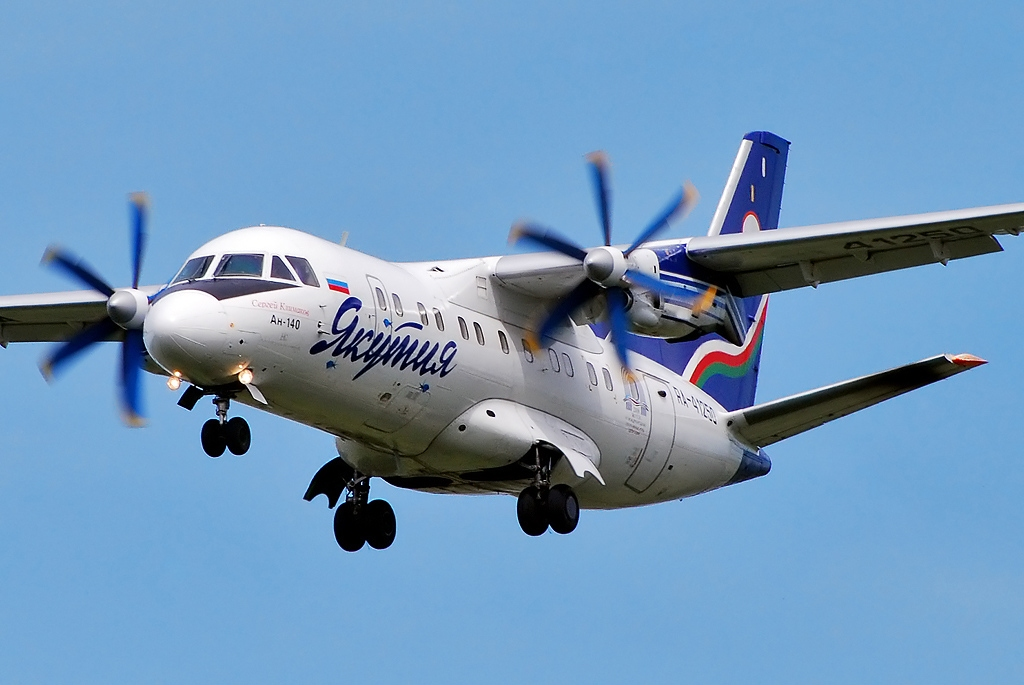
Yakutia Airlines Antonov An-140

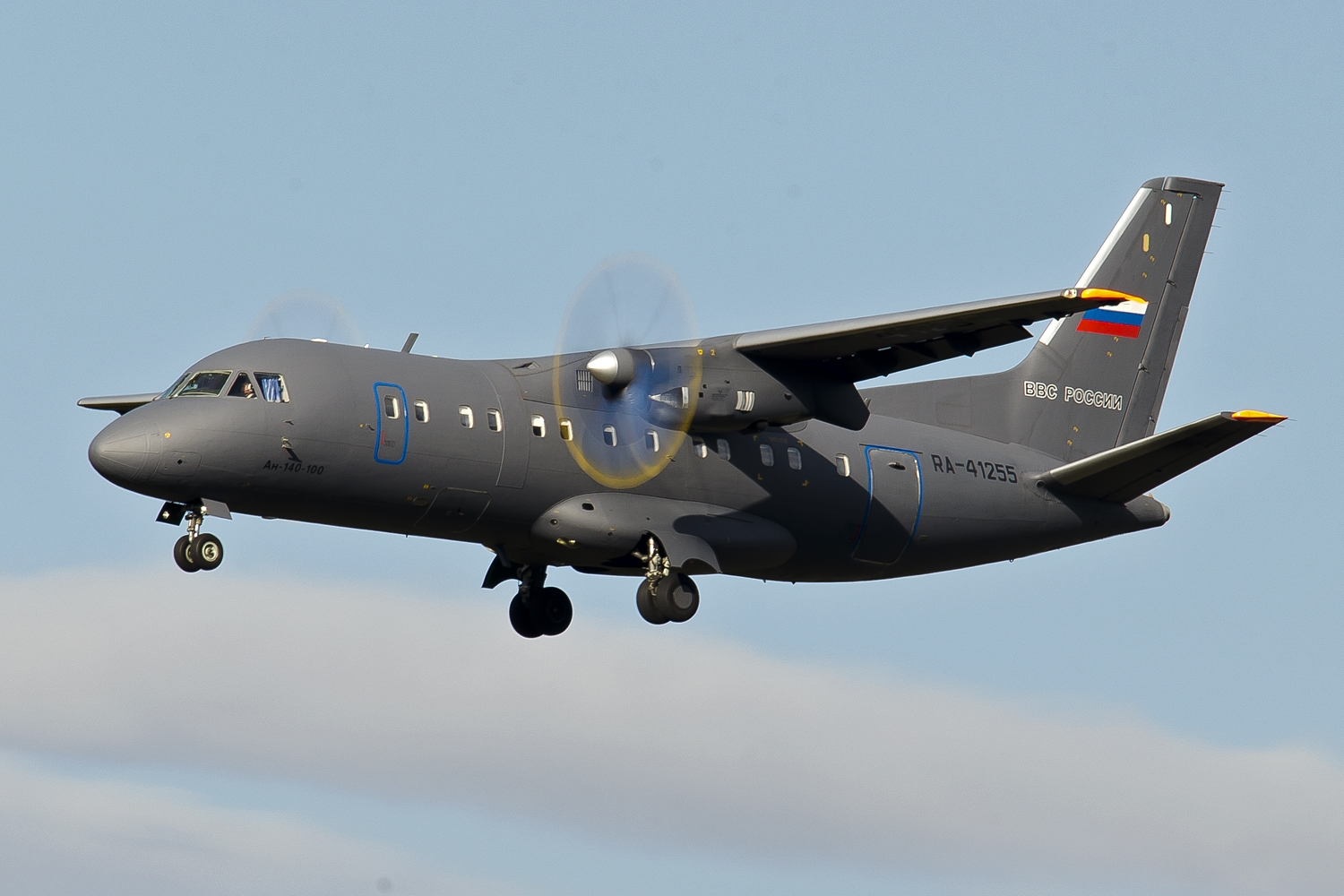
Russian Ministry of Defense Antonov An-140

As of December 2022, 23 An-140 and further 10 HESA IrAn-140 have been built for airline and government service, including prototypes. Of these 33 aircraft, only 9 remain in active service. While 20 further aircraft are stored, four An-140 were lost in accidents.

Operator	In service	On order
(Russia) Yakutia Airlines	2	—
(Russia) Russian Aerospace Forces	3	3
(Russia) Russian Naval Aviation	4	—
Total	9	3

== Accidents and incidents ==
Since its introduction in 2002, the Antonov An-140 has been involved in five accidents and incidents, including four hull-loss accidents, resulting in 111 occupant fatalities. Of the aircraft lost, three were HESA IrAn-140 aircraft built in Iran from knock-down kits supplied by Antonov.

- On 23 December 2002, Aeromist-Kharkiv Flight 2137, an An-140 (UR-14003) carrying many of Ukraine's top aviation designers and engineers, crashed into a mountainside as it was preparing to land at Isfahan, Iran, killing all 44 on board. The delegation was to have attended the inauguration ceremonies for the first HESA IrAn-140 airframe. The probable cause was controlled flight into terrain (CFIT) due to incorrect use of the cockpit satellite navigation system.
- On 12 August 2005, a Safiran Airlines HESA IrAn-140 diverted to Arak Airport due to an engine failure. During landing, the aircraft overran the runway and was badly damaged. There were no fatalities. The cause of the engine failure appeared to be technical problems with the fuel control unit. The airframe was eventually repaired in the early 2010s and is to be used by HESA as a test bed for the future versions of the aircraft. After the Arak incident, Safiran Airlines returned its two remaining examples to HESA.
- On 23 December 2005, Azerbaijan Airlines Flight 217, an An-140-100 (4K-AZ48), crashed into the Caspian Sea at CA 22:40, killing all 23 passengers and crew on board. Investigations discovered that three independent gyroscopes were not providing stabilized heading and attitude information to the crew early in the flight. The airline grounded its remaining An-140 airplanes, and cancelled plans to purchase more of the type from Ukraine.
- On 15 February 2009, an IrAn-140-100 (test registration HESA 90-04) crashed at Shahin Shahr, Isfahan province, Iran, during a training flight, killing the five crew.
- On 10 August 2014, Sepahan Airlines Flight 5915, an IrAn-140-100 (registration EP-GPA), crashed shortly after taking off from Tehran Mehrabad International Airport. The aircraft was on a domestic service to Tabas. According to initial reports, around 40 passengers and 8 crew members were on board the aircraft, which broke up and burst into flames. It was reported that the aircraft suffered an engine failure shortly after take-off. There were 8 survivors. The aircraft was built in 2008 and was fitted with the Klimov TV3-117VMA-SBM1 engines. Survivors reported that the number two engine had stopped during the take off. Following this crash, the Iranian IrAn-140 fleet was grounded, pending outcome of the investigation. On 23 August 2014 Brigadier General Hossein Dehqan, Iran's Minister of Defence, announced full compliance of IrAn-140 airplanes (Iranian licensed production of An-140-100) with ICAO requirements and that the aircraft is certified by Iran's Civil Aviation Organisation. The announcement was made due to the investigation of IrAn-140 crash in Tehran on 10 August 2014.

== Specifications (An-140 AI-30 engines) ==
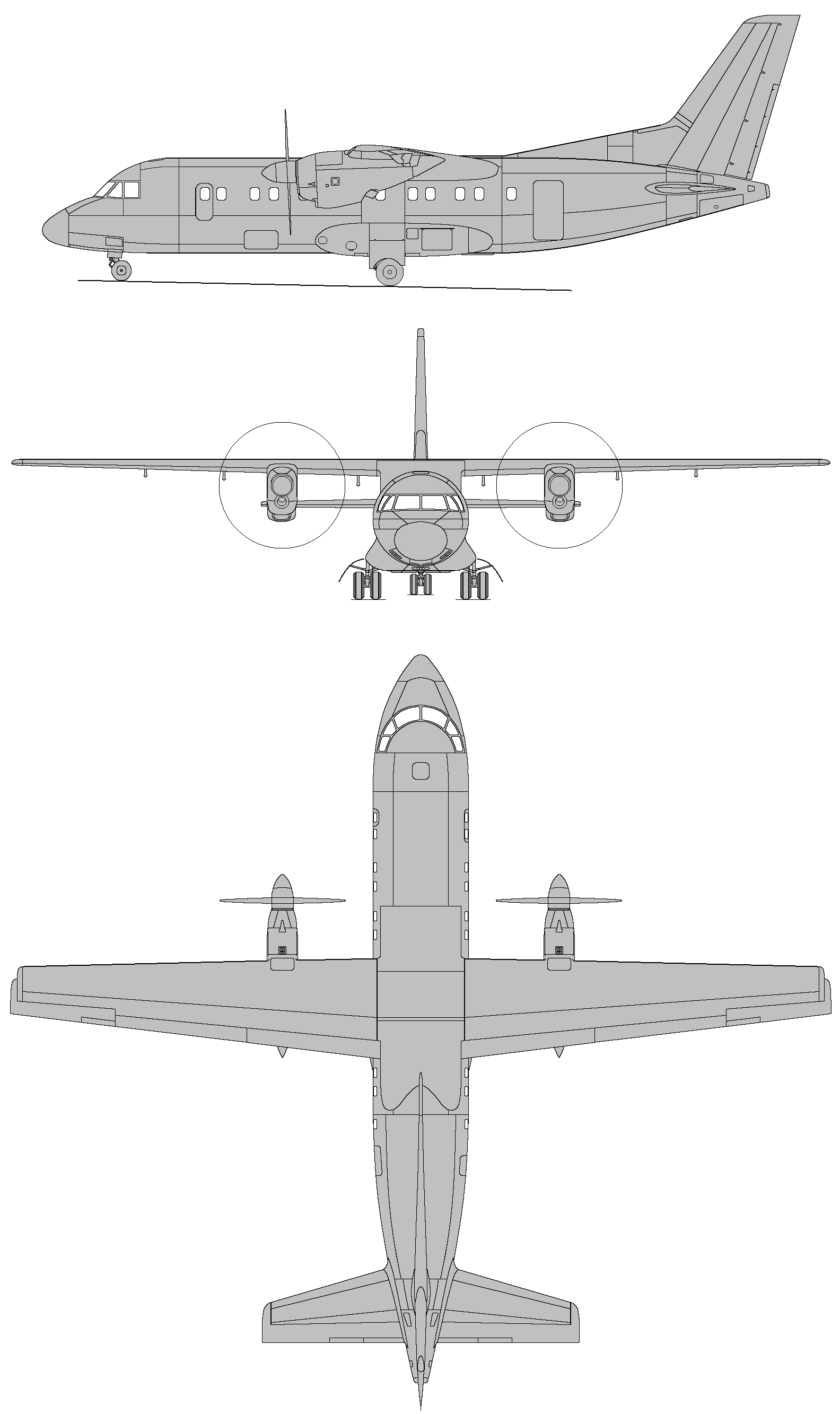

Data from Jane's all the World's Aircraft 2000–01, www.antonov.com

General characteristics

- Crew: 2
- Capacity: 52 pax / 6,000 kg (13,228 lb) max payload
- Length: 22.605 m (74 ft 2 in)
- Wingspan: 24.505 m (80 ft 5 in)
- Height: 8.225 m (27 ft 0 in)
- Wing area: 51 m^{2} (550 sq ft)
- Empty weight: 12,810 kg (28,241 lb)
- Max takeoff weight: 19,150 kg (42,219 lb)
- Maximum zero fuel weight: 17,800 kg (39,242 lb)
- Maximum landing weight: 19,100 kg (42,108 lb)
- Fuel capacity: 4,370 kg (9,634 lb)
- Powerplant: 2 × Motor-Sich AI-30 series 1 turboprop engines, 1,838 kW (2,465 hp) each (licence-built Klimov TV3-117VMA-SBM1)

- Alternate engines: 2x Pratt & Whitney Canada PW127A turboprops driving Hamilton Sundstrand 247F propellers

- Propellers: 6-bladed Aerosila SV-14, 3.6 m (11 ft 10 in) diameter constant-speed fully feathering reversible propellers

Performance

- Cruise speed: 575 km/h (357 mph, 310 kn) at 7,200–7,500 m (23,600–24,600 ft) max
- Economical cruise speed: 520 km/h (320 mph; 280 kn) at 7,200–7,500 m (23,600–24,600 ft)
- Range: 900 km (560 mi, 490 nmi) with 6,000 kg (13,228 lb) payload at econ. cruise

2,100 km (1,300 mi; 1,100 nmi) with 52 pax
3,700 km (2,300 mi; 2,000 nmi) with 33 pax

- Service ceiling: 7,600 m (24,900 ft)
- Rate of climb: 6.83 m/s (1,344 ft/min)
- Power/mass: 0.19 kW/kg (0.12 hp/lb)
- Balanced field length: 1,350 m (4,429 ft)

Avionics
Buran weather radar

== See also ==
Related development

- HESA Simourgh

Aircraft of comparable role, configuration, and era

- ATR 42
- De Havilland Canada Dash 8
- Dornier 328
- Fokker 50
- Ilyushin Il-114
- Let L-610
- Saab 340
- Xian MA600

Related lists

- List of civil aircraft
