= Akaflieg München Mü30 Schlacro =

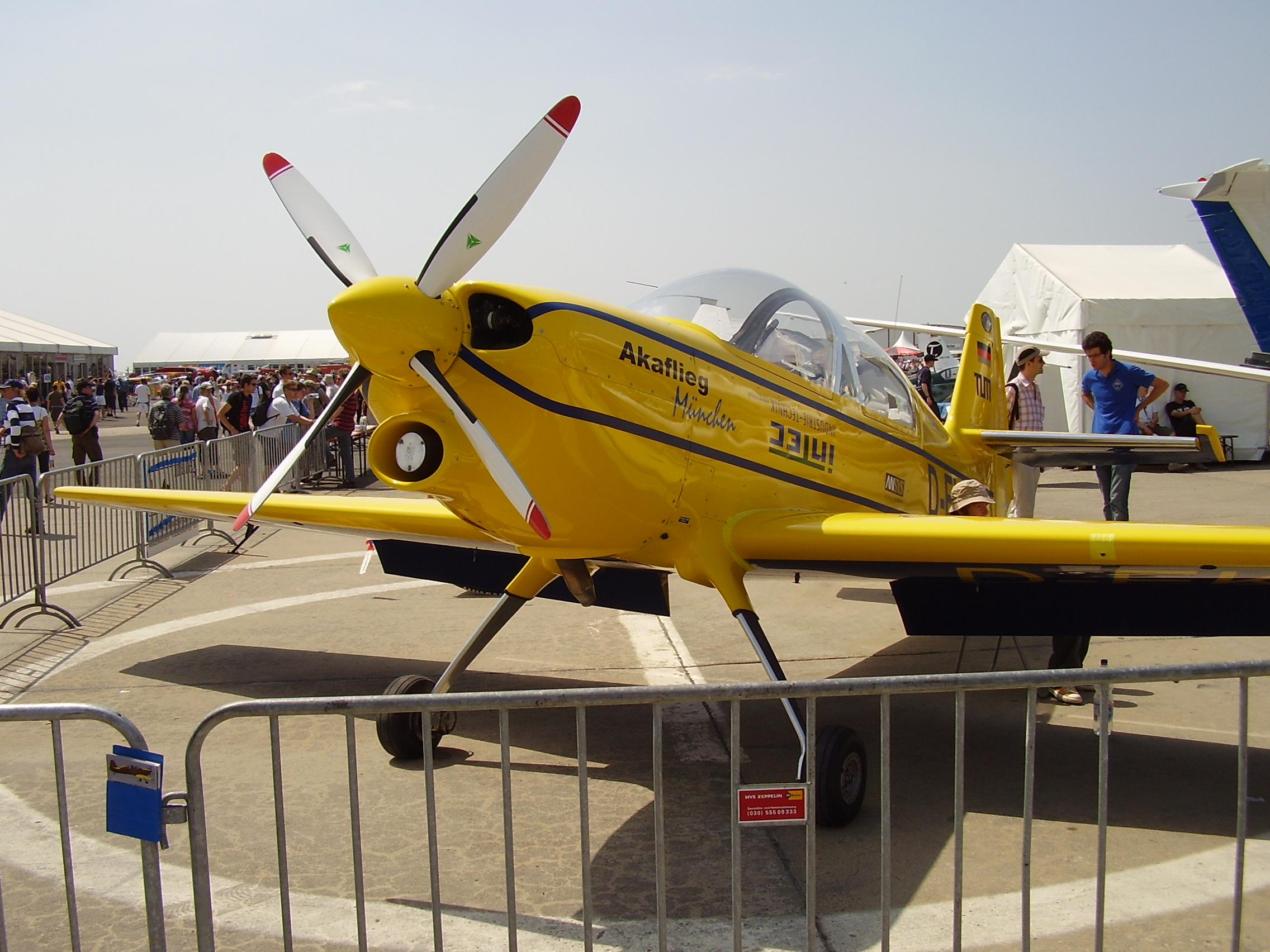
- The Mü30 Schlacro in the static park at the 2008 ILA at Berlin Tempelhof

General information
- Type: Aerobatic Aircraft and Glider Tug
- National origin: Germany
- Manufacturer: Akaflieg München
- Designer: Dieter Thomas
- Number built: 1

History
- First flight: 2000

The Akaflieg München Mü30 Schlacro (SCHLepp-ACRObatic) is a high performance two-seat glider tug and aerobatic aircraft designed and built in Germany from 1985.

== Development ==
Students at Akaflieg München recognized that the requirements of an aerobatic aircraft and glider tug coincided, both needing a high power-to-weight ratio, high rate of climb at relatively low speed, and high control authority. To meet these requirements design and construction of the Mü30 began in 1985. Initially it was intended to fit a Porsche PFM 3200, obtained from Porsche at no cost. Use of the PFM 3200 promised to cut operating costs and environmental impact dramatically, with the engine certified to use MOGAS in place of the very expensive AVGAS, but Porsche abandoned development of the PFM3200 in 1992, leaving the Mü30 without an engine.

During development the ailerons were optimized for maximum roll rate, the wings revised with carbonfibre structure and the center of gravity adjusted by moving the wings 150 mm (5.9 in) forward, compensating for a heavier Lycoming engine and ensuring reserve for possible future re-design.

Work on the prototype continued and an alternative engine installation was designed for the 223 kW (300 hp) Lycoming AEIO-540 driving a four-bladed propeller. First flight with the Lycoming engine was carried out in 2000 with flight testing continuing till 2003. Problems with cooling the Lycoming engine necessitated the complete re-design of the cooling air intake, exhaust system and cowling.

Flying re-commenced on 16 February 2007, resuming flight tests which, so far, have proved to be satisfactory and certification is well advanced. Initial problems with lateral stability have been overcome by altering the control geometry and flight tests by Uli Schell have revealed the aircraft to have adequate stability and be easy to control. Flight testing was completed by New Year's Eve 2007, with the exception of V_{d} (Maximum Design Dive Speed – 1.2x V_{ne}) which had earlier highlighted problems with the elevator trim. After thickening the trailing edge of the elevators the trim problems were alleviated and the V_{d} test was carried out successfully.

== Specifications (Mü30) ==
General characteristics

- Crew: 2
- Length: 7.5 m (24 ft 7 in)
- Wingspan: 9 m (29 ft 6 in)
- Empty weight: 748 kg (1,649 lb)
- Powerplant: 1 × Lycoming AEIO-540 6-cyl. air-cooled horizontally-opposed piston engine, 220 kW (300 hp)

Performance

- Maximum speed: 400 km/h (250 mph, 220 kn)

== Gallery ==
Akaflieg München Mü30 Schlacro
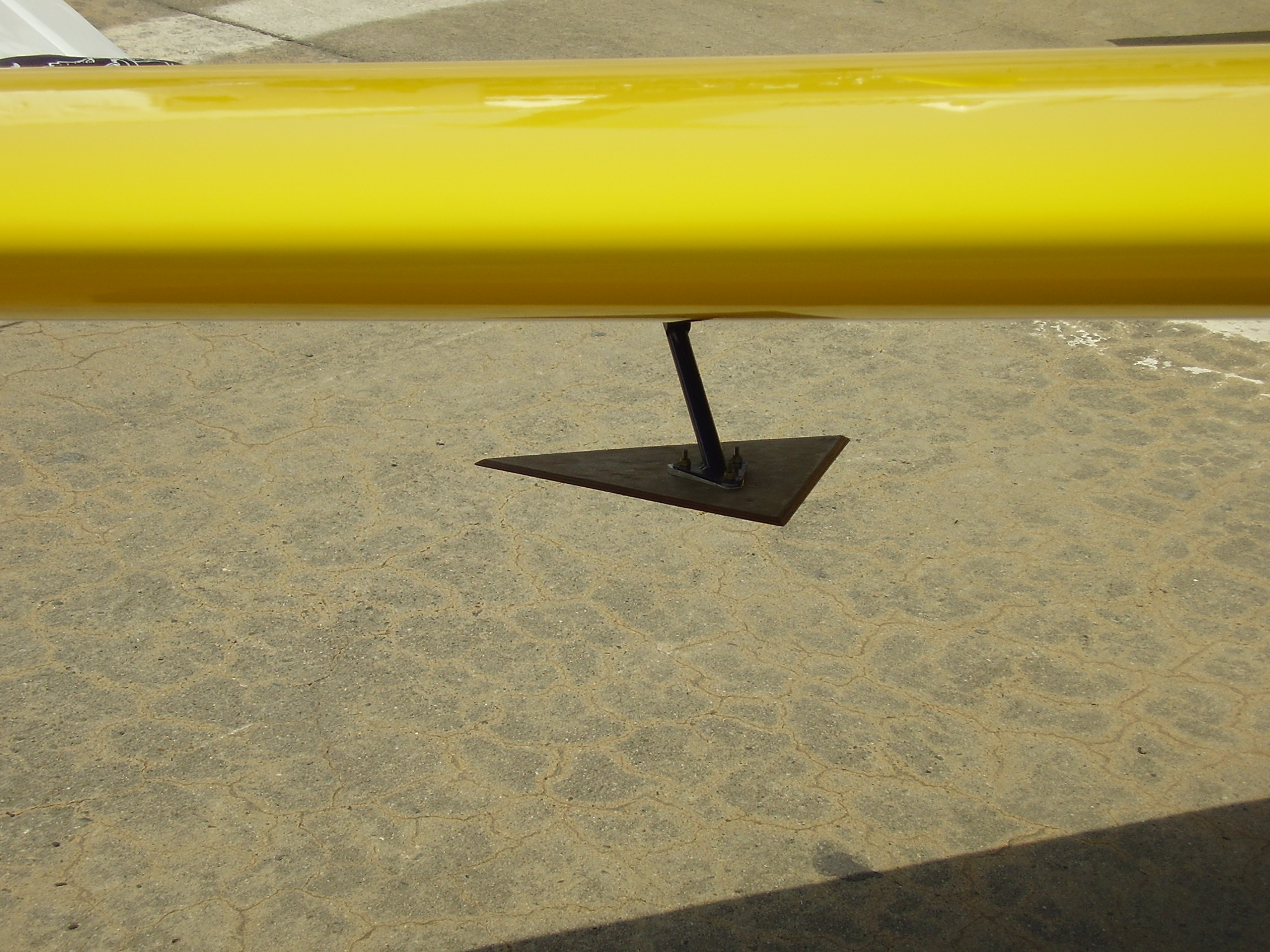
The aileron servo balance

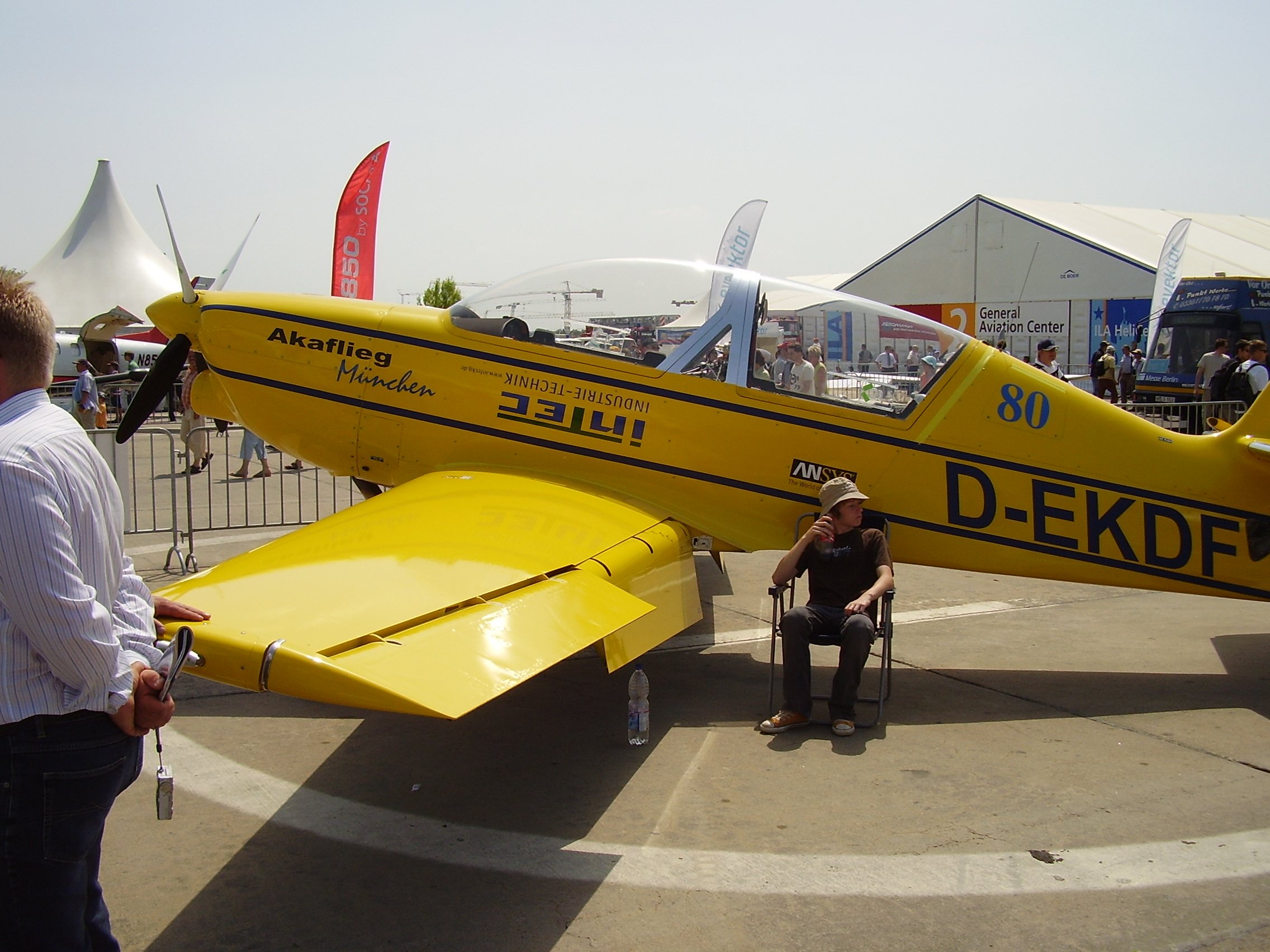
A side view showing the tandem cockpit and deflected flaps

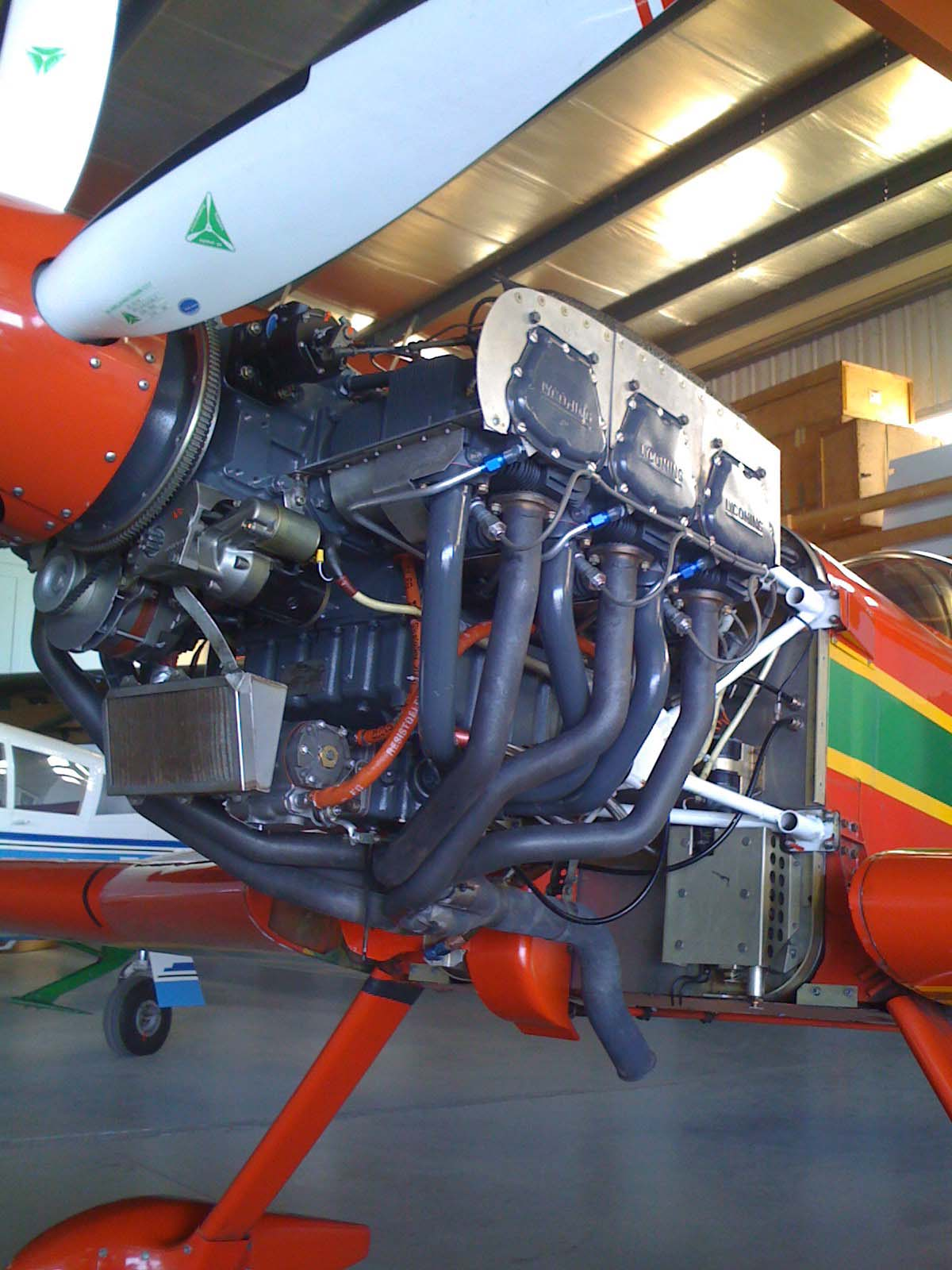
The Lycoming AEIO-540 installation in a CAP 231

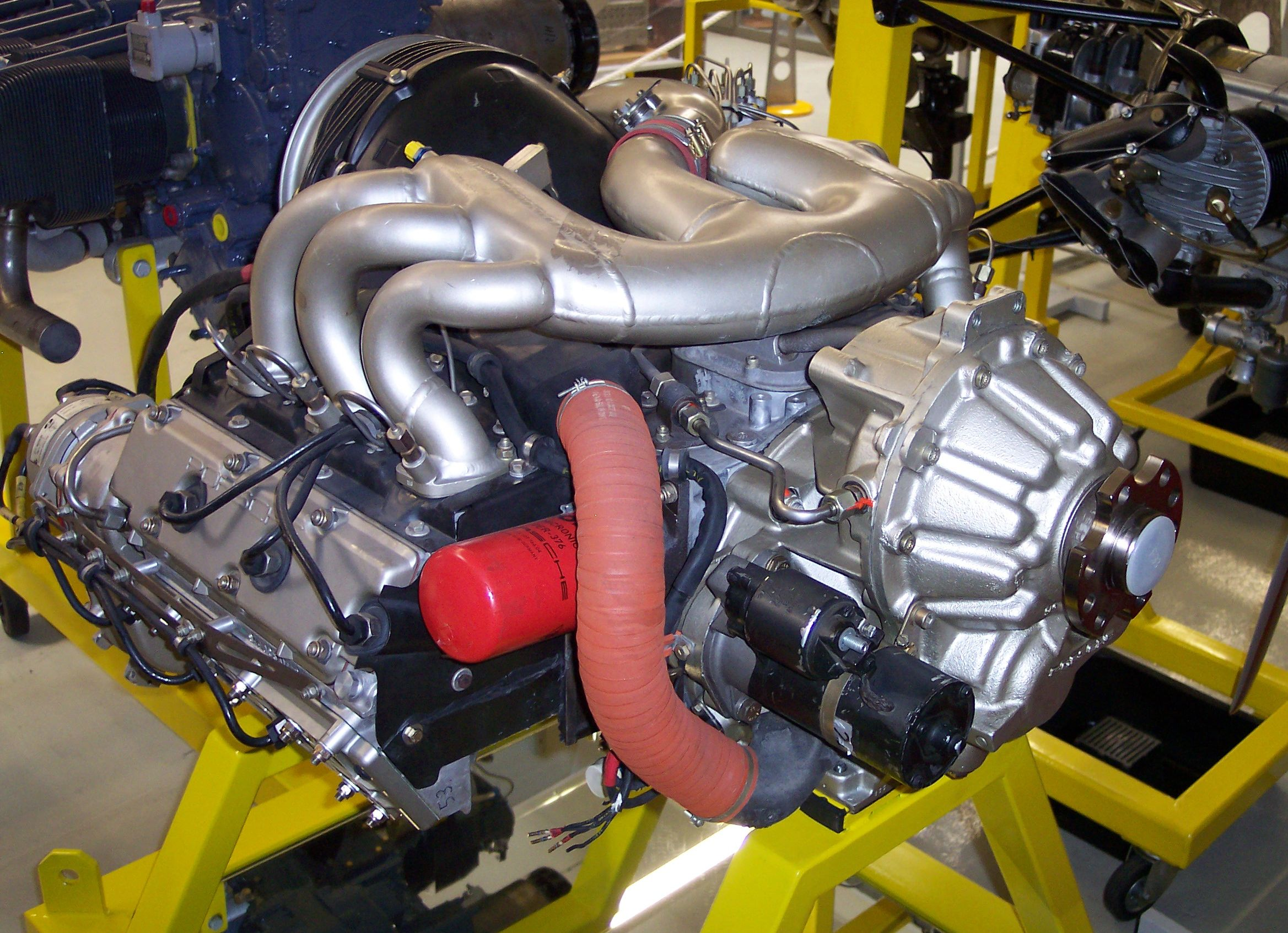
The Porsche PFM 3200

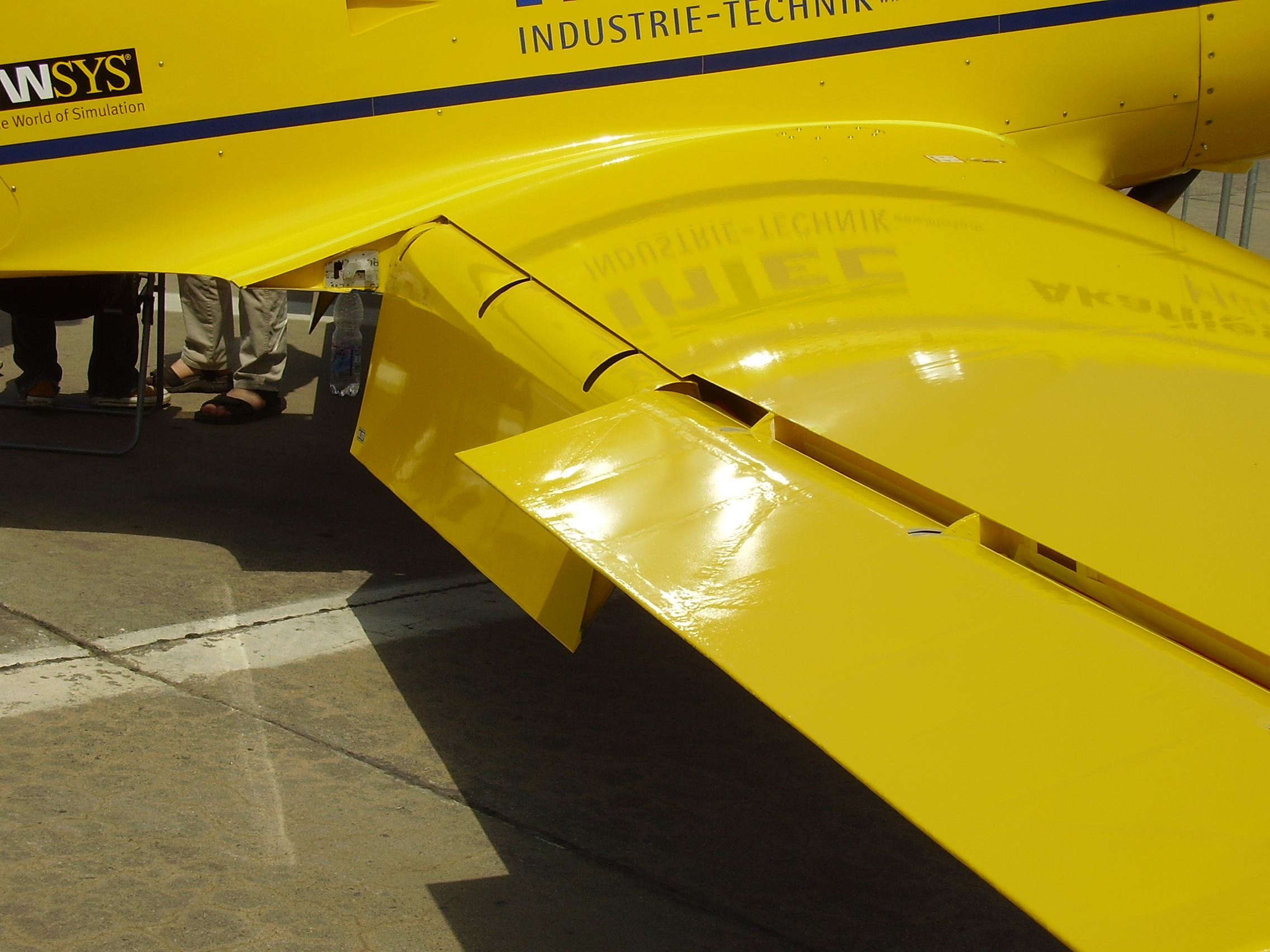
The flaps on the Mü30

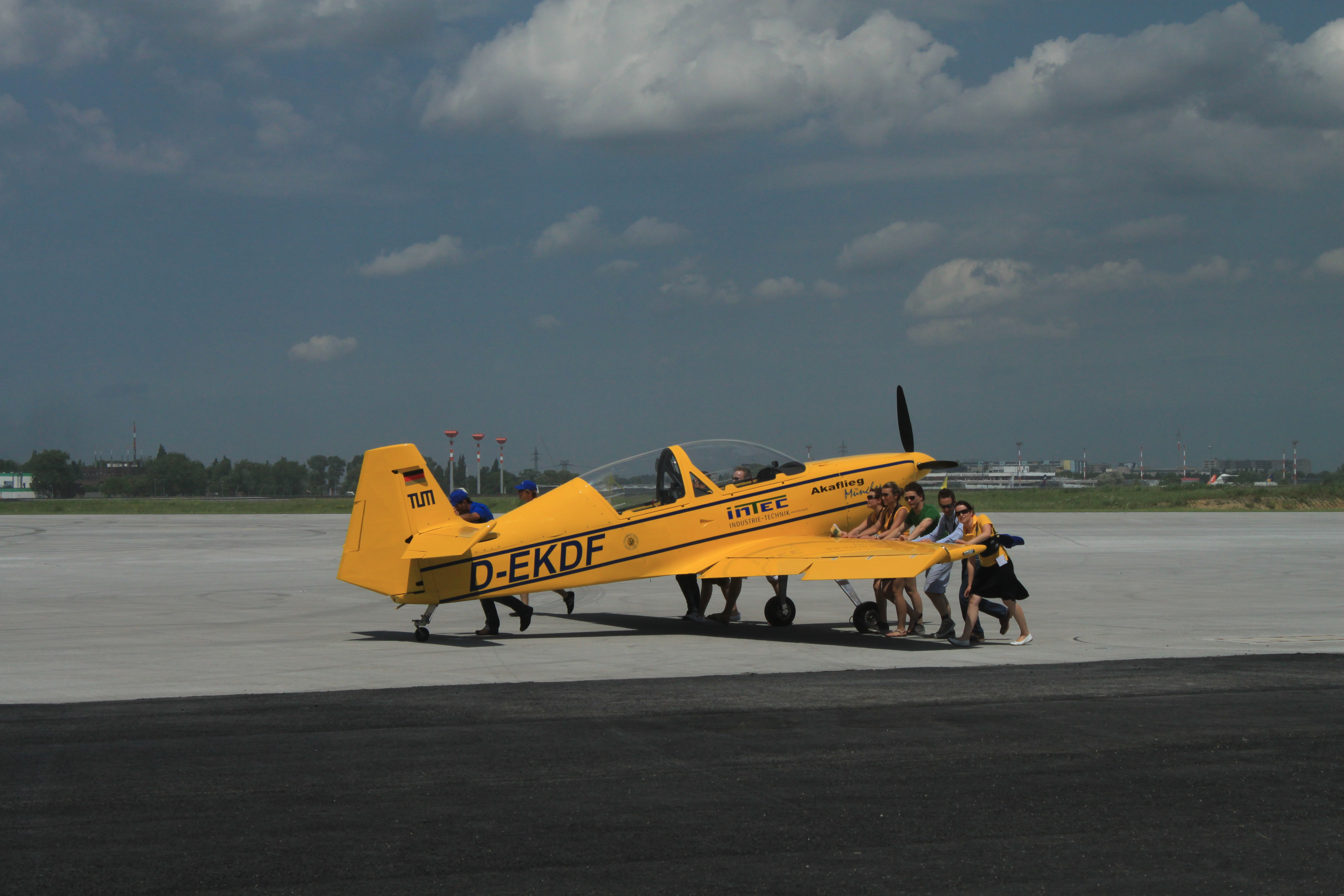
The Mü30 at ILA 2010
