= Performance Aircraft Formula GT =

American homebuilt airplane

Formula GT
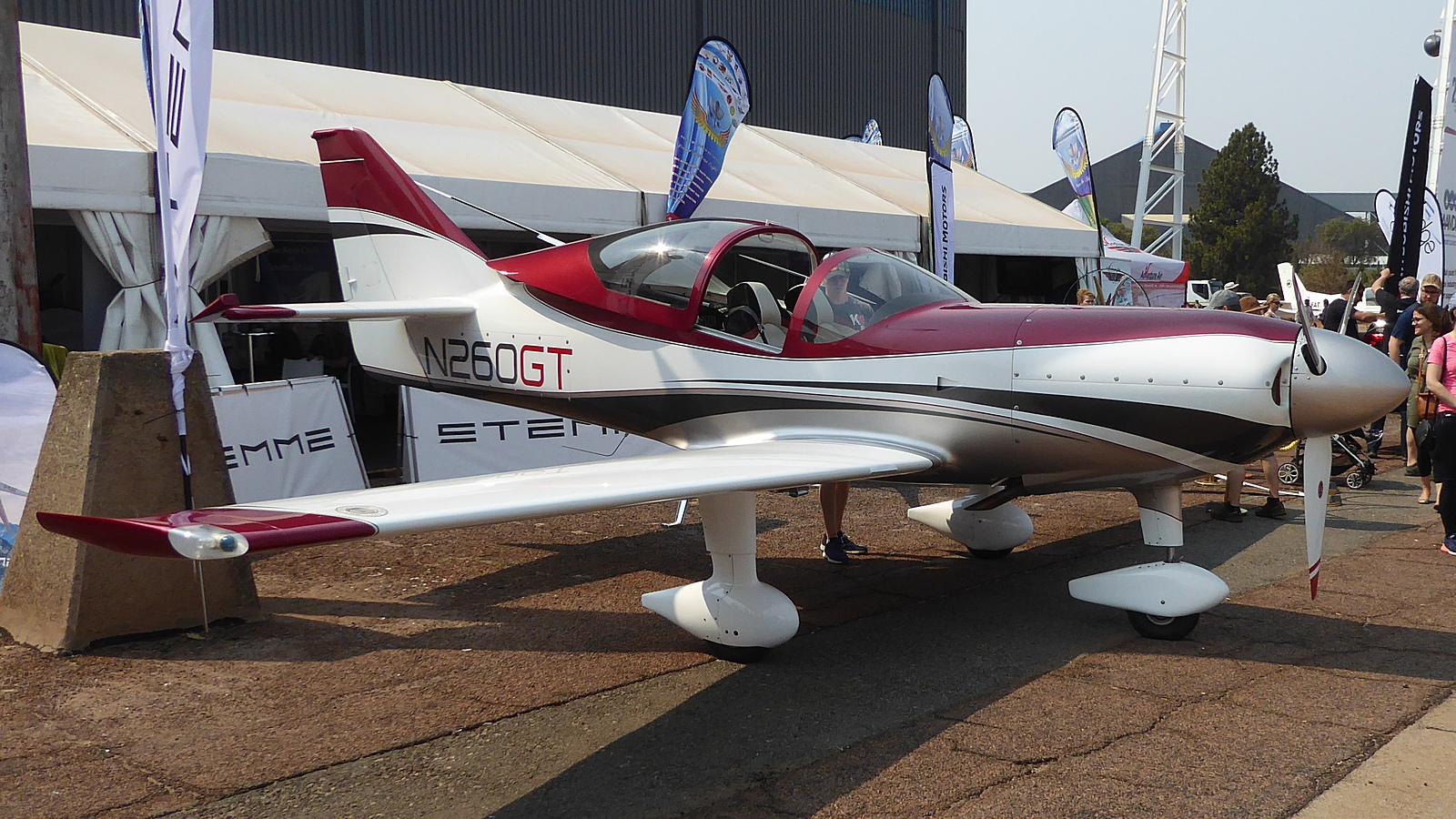

General information
- Type: Homebuilt aircraft
- National origin: United States
- Manufacturer: Performance Aircraft
- Designer: Jeff Ackland
- Status: Production completed
- Number built: At least one

History
- Introduction date: 1990s

The Performance Aircraft Formula GT is an American homebuilt aircraft that was designed by Performance Aircraft of Olathe, Kansas, introduced in the 1990s. Developed from the Performance Aircraft Legend, work was delayed while the company concentrated on the Turbine Legend. In 2002 the president of Performance Aircraft, Jeff Ackland, sold the company, which became Legend Aircraft Inc in Louisiana, and, with Mark Borrow, started Midwest Aerosport Inc, using the Performance Aircraft facilities in Kansas to develop the Formula GT.

The aircraft was to be supplied as a kit for amateur construction.

== Design and development ==
The Formula GT features a cantilever low-wing, a two-seats-in-side-by-side configuration enclosed cockpit under a bubble canopy, fixed tricycle landing gear with wheel pants and a single engine in tractor configuration.

The aircraft is made from composite materials. Its 28.5 ft (8.7 m) span wing, mounts slotted electric flaps and has a wing area of 100 sq ft (9.3 m^{2}). The cabin width is 47 in (120 cm). The design includes dual side sticks and a large baggage compartment with its own external door. The acceptable power range is 250 to 350 hp (186 to 261 kW) and the standard engine specified is a 300 hp (224 kW) liquid-cooled V-8 automotive conversion powerplant.

The aircraft has a typical empty weight of 1,400 lb (640 kg) and a gross weight of 2,300 lb (1,000 kg), giving a useful load of 900 lb (410 kg). With full fuel of 110 U.S. gallons (420 L; 92 imp gal) the payload for the pilot, passenger and baggage is 240 lb (110 kg).

The standard day, sea level, no wind, take off with a 300 hp (224 kW) engine is 800 ft (244 m) and the landing roll is 600 ft (183 m).

The manufacturer estimated the construction time from the supplied kit as 1500 hours.

== Operational history ==
The prototype, registered N260GT and powered by a Lycoming IO-540 of 260 horsepower (190 kW), was introduced at EAA Airventure Oshkosh in July 2002. The registration was cancelled in 2021 after the aircraft had been exported to South Africa where it was registered ZU-FGT. There is no evidence of any further aircraft being completed.

== Specifications (Formula GT) ==
Data from AeroCrafter

General characteristics

- Crew: one
- Capacity: one passenger
- Wingspan: 28 ft 6 in (8.69 m)
- Wing area: 100 sq ft (9.3 m^{2})
- Aspect ratio: 8.1:1
- Empty weight: 1,400 lb (635 kg)
- Gross weight: 2,300 lb (1,043 kg)
- Powerplant: 1 × Liquid-cooled V-8 automotive conversion , 300 hp (220 kW)

Performance

- Maximum speed: 250 mph (400 km/h, 220 kn)
- Cruise speed: 230 mph (370 km/h, 200 kn)
- Stall speed: 61 mph (98 km/h, 53 kn) flaps down
- Range: 1,500 mi (2,400 km, 1,300 nmi)
- Service ceiling: 23,000 ft (7,000 m)
- Rate of climb: 2,000 ft/min (10 m/s)
- Wing loading: 23.0 lb/sq ft (112 kg/m^{2})
