= Steen Skybolt =

American homebuilt aircraft

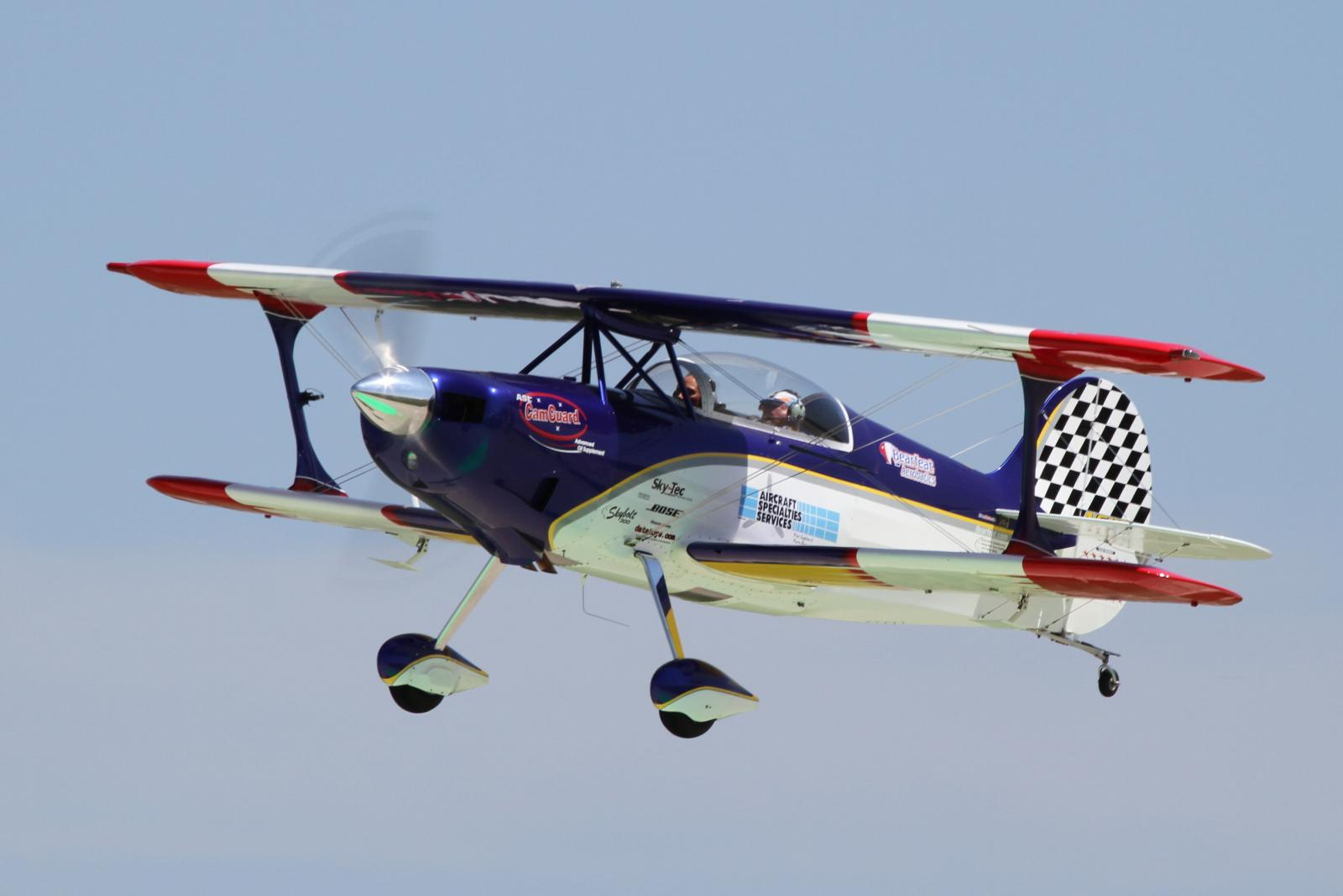

General information
- Type: Aerobatic biplane
- National origin: United States
- Manufacturer: Steen Aero Lab Inc
- Designer: Lamar Steen
- Status: Plans available
- Primary user: private owner pilots
- Number built: over 400

History
- First flight: October 1970
- Variant: Starfire Firebolt

The Steen Skybolt is an American homebuilt aerobatic biplane. Designed by teacher Lamar Steen as a high school engineering project, the prototype first flew in October 1970.

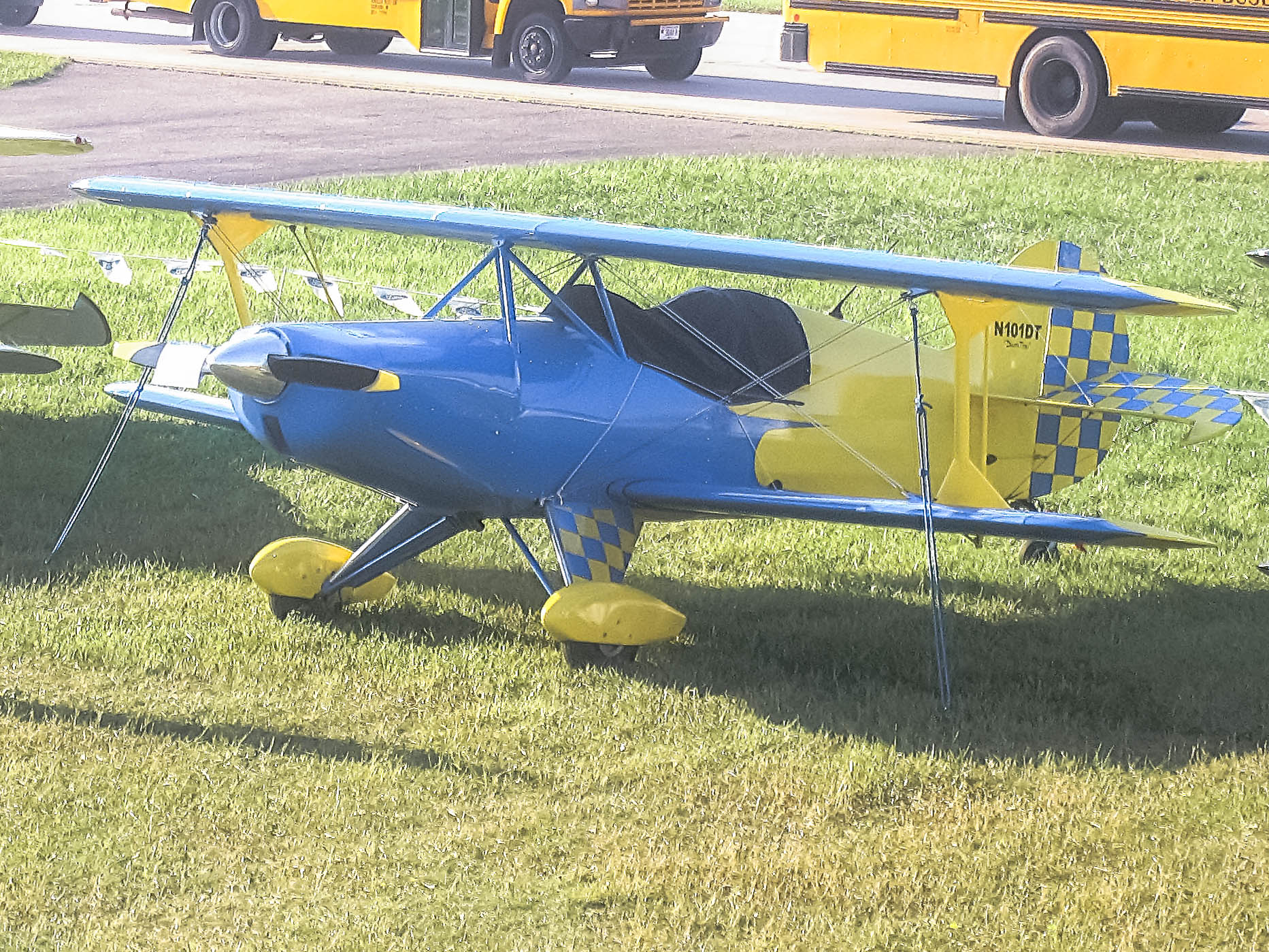
Steen Skybolt I

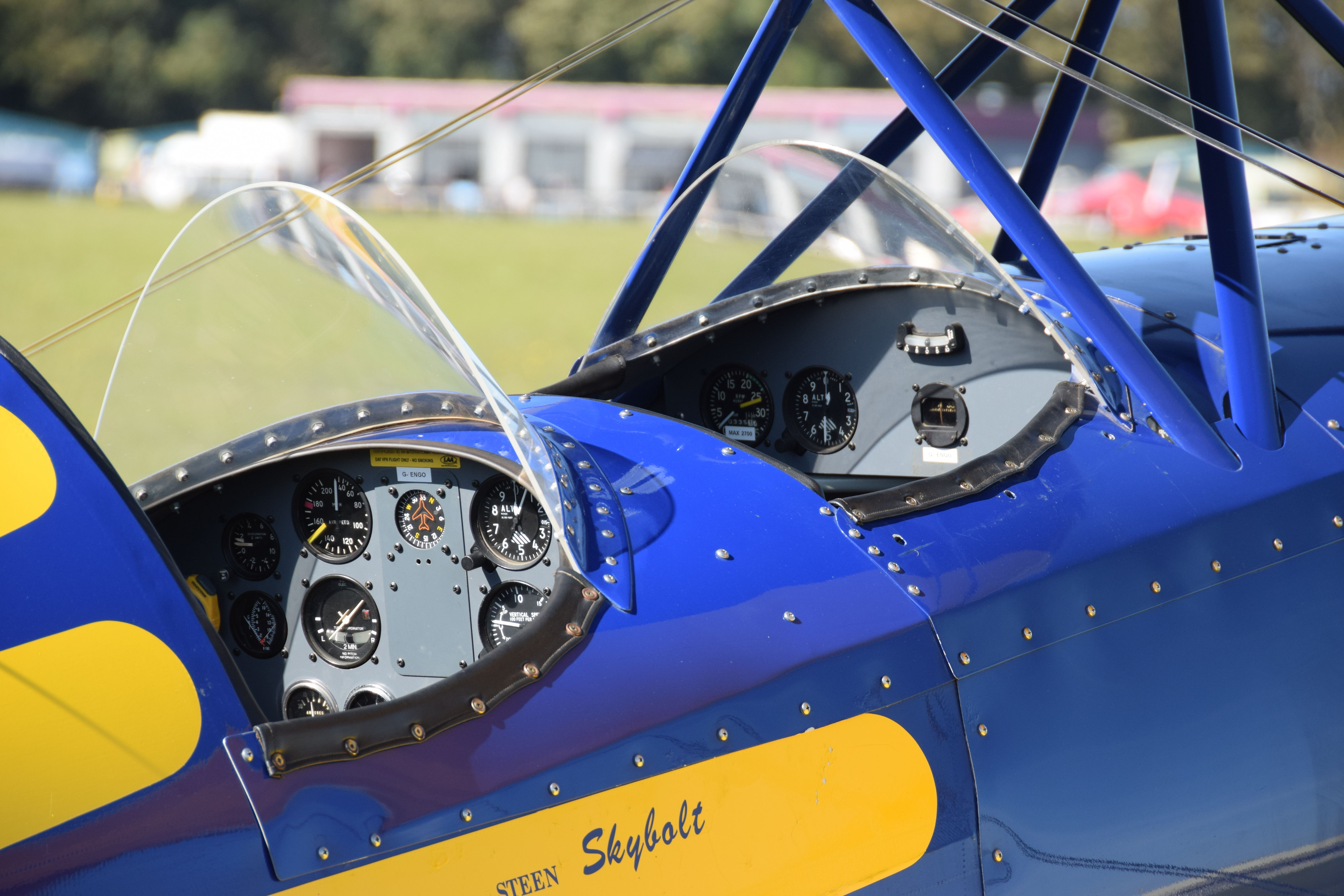
Steen Skybolt cockpit

== Design and development ==
The aircraft has a classic structure consisting of a welded tube fuselage and wooden wings, all fabric covered. It is a tandem open-cockpit two-seat biplane and is stressed for normal aerobatics. The cockpits are frequently constructed as a single tandem cabin with an enclosing bubble canopy. Some aerobatic competition aircraft are built as single seaters with the front cockpit closed off.

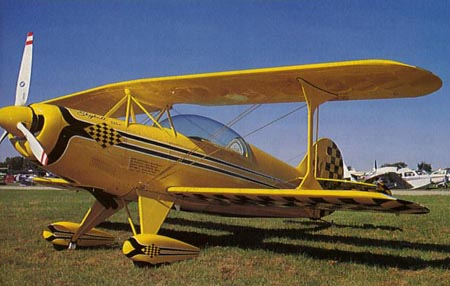
The original Steenaero Hale Wallace over 300 hp Skybolt named Yellow Bird

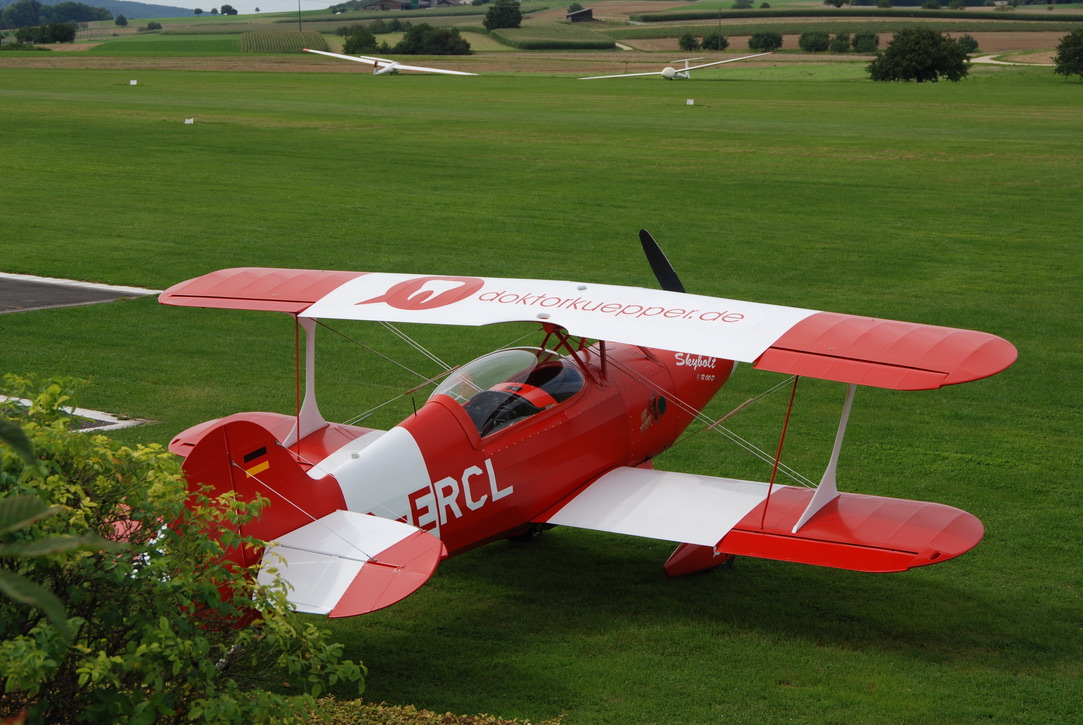

The original Skybolt had a 180 hp (134 kW) Lycoming HO-360-B1B engine, but powerplants of 150 to 260 hp (112 to 194 kW) can be installed.

== Operational history ==
The Skybolt has become popular as an amateur-built sporting biplane, with over 400 aircraft having been completed from construction plans sold in over 29 countries. A Skybolt won the Reserve Grand Champion Custom Built for 1979 at the Experimental Aircraft Association airshow in Oshkosh Wisconsin. Sixteen examples were registered in the United Kingdom in January 2009.

== Variants ==
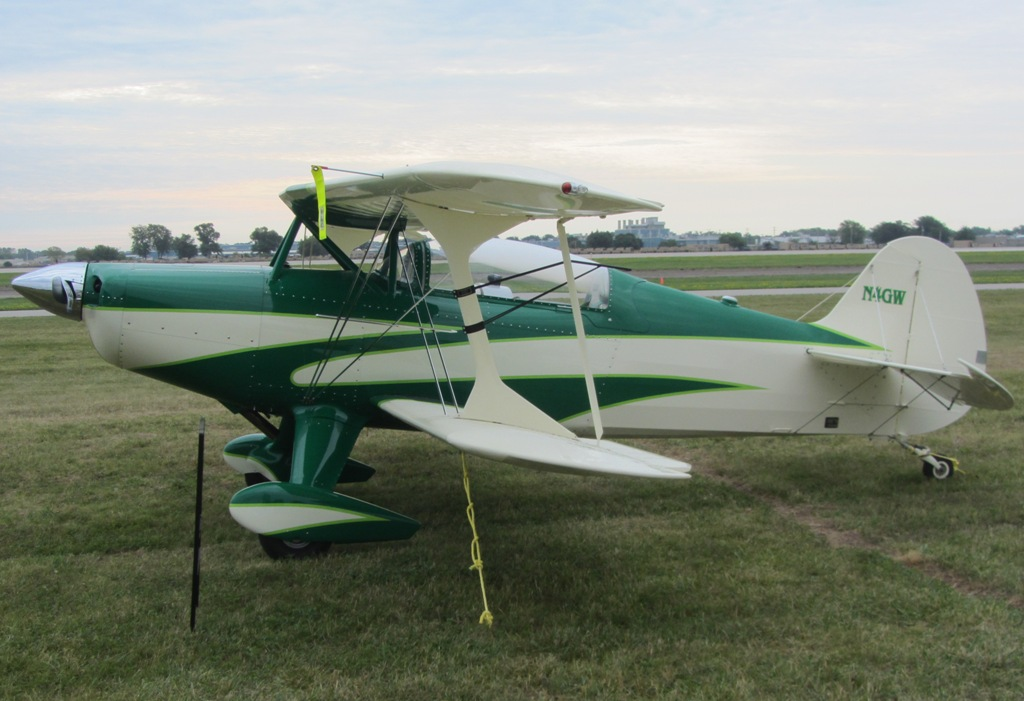
Steen Firebolt

Skybolt (S)
The standard Skybolt as originally released for home-building
Skybolt (D)
A revised structure and capability to have engines from 180 to 350 hp (134 to 261 kW) fitted.
Skybolt (R)
A radial engined derivative, with revised fuselage plus the improved structure of the (D), fitted with either a 360 hp (268 kW) Vedeneyev M14P or a 400 hp (298 kW) Vedeneyev M14PF nine-cylinder radial.
Skybolt 300
A derivative of the Skybolt fitted with a 300 hp (224 kW) engine.
Super Skybolt
A two seater version created by John Shipler by amalgamating a Pitts S-2 with a Skybolt, the prototype of which is named Storm Warning.
Starfire Firebolt
A development of the Skybolt with a 300 hp (224 kW) Lycoming IO-540 powerplant that gives a cruise speed of 202 mph (325 km/h) and an initial climb rate of 4,000 ft/min (20 m/s).

== Specifications (Skybolt (D)) ==
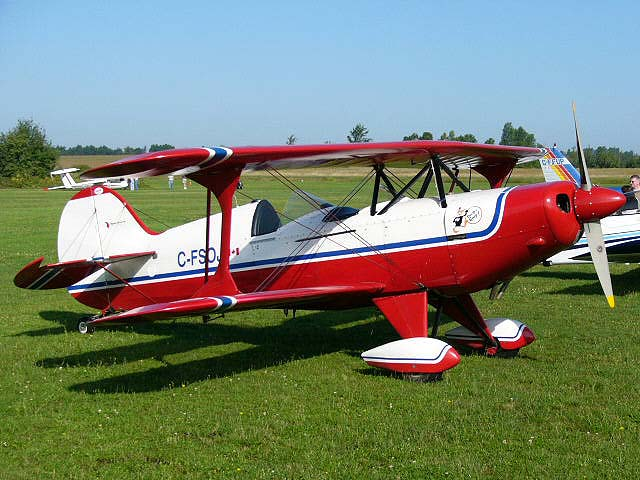
Steen Skybolt

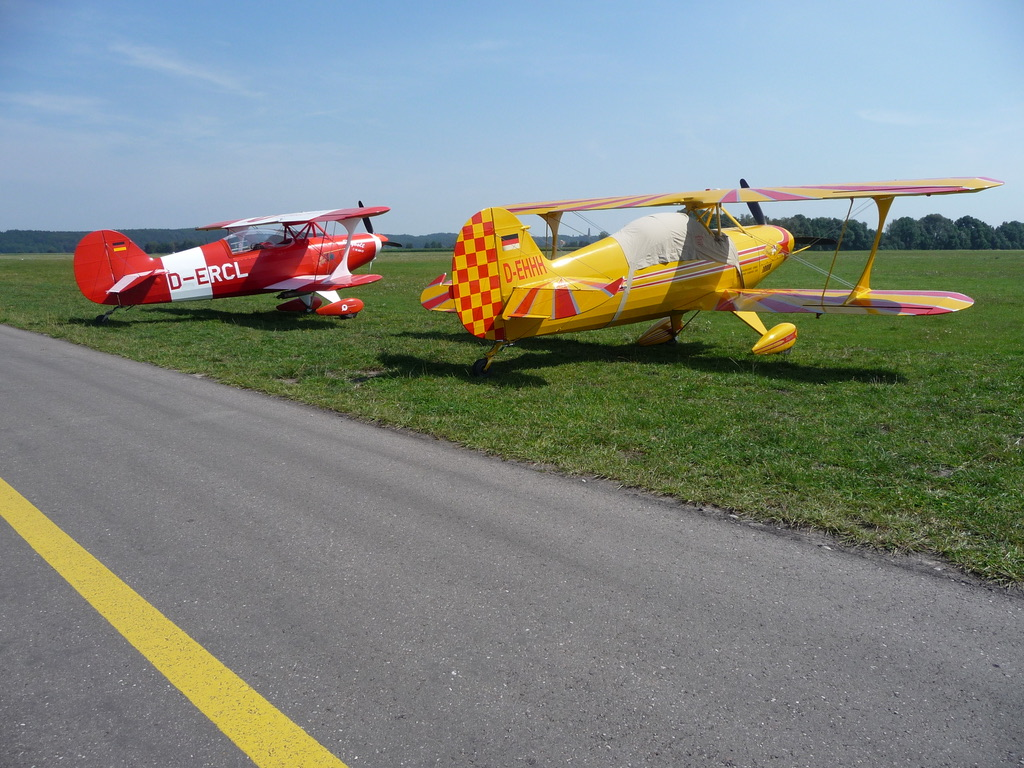
German Steen Skybolt aircraft D-ERCL and D-EHHH at Augsburg airport. D-EHHH was destroyed in a mid-air-collision https://aviation-safety.net/wikibase/214043

Data from Simpson 2001

General characteristics

- Crew: one
- Capacity: one passenger
- Length: 19 ft 0 in (5.79 m)
- Wingspan: 24 ft 0 in (7.32 m)
- Height: 7 ft 0 in (2.13 m)
- Empty weight: 1,080 lb (490 kg)
- Max takeoff weight: 1,650 lb (748 kg)
- Powerplant: 1 × Lycoming HO-360-B1B piston, 180 hp (130 kW)

Performance

- Maximum speed: 145 mph (233 km/h, 126 kn)
- Cruise speed: 130 mph (210 km/h, 110 kn)
- Range: 450 mi (720 km, 390 nmi)
- Rate of climb: 2,500 ft/min (13 m/s)

== See also ==
Aircraft of comparable role, configuration, and era

- Acro Sport II
- Pitts Special
- Sorrell Hiperbipe
- Aviat Eagle II (Christen Eagle)
