= Firebolt =

Firebolt may refer to:

- Starfire Firebolt, an American homebuilt aerobatic biplane
- USS Firebolt (PC-10), a coastal patrol boat of the United States Navy
- AQM-81A Firebolt, an American target drone
- Firebolt (Harry Potter), a fictional flying broomstick in the Harry Potter Quidditch game
- The Buell XB9R Firebolt and Buell XB12R Firebolt sport bikes
