= Wheeler Express =

Type of aircraft

Express
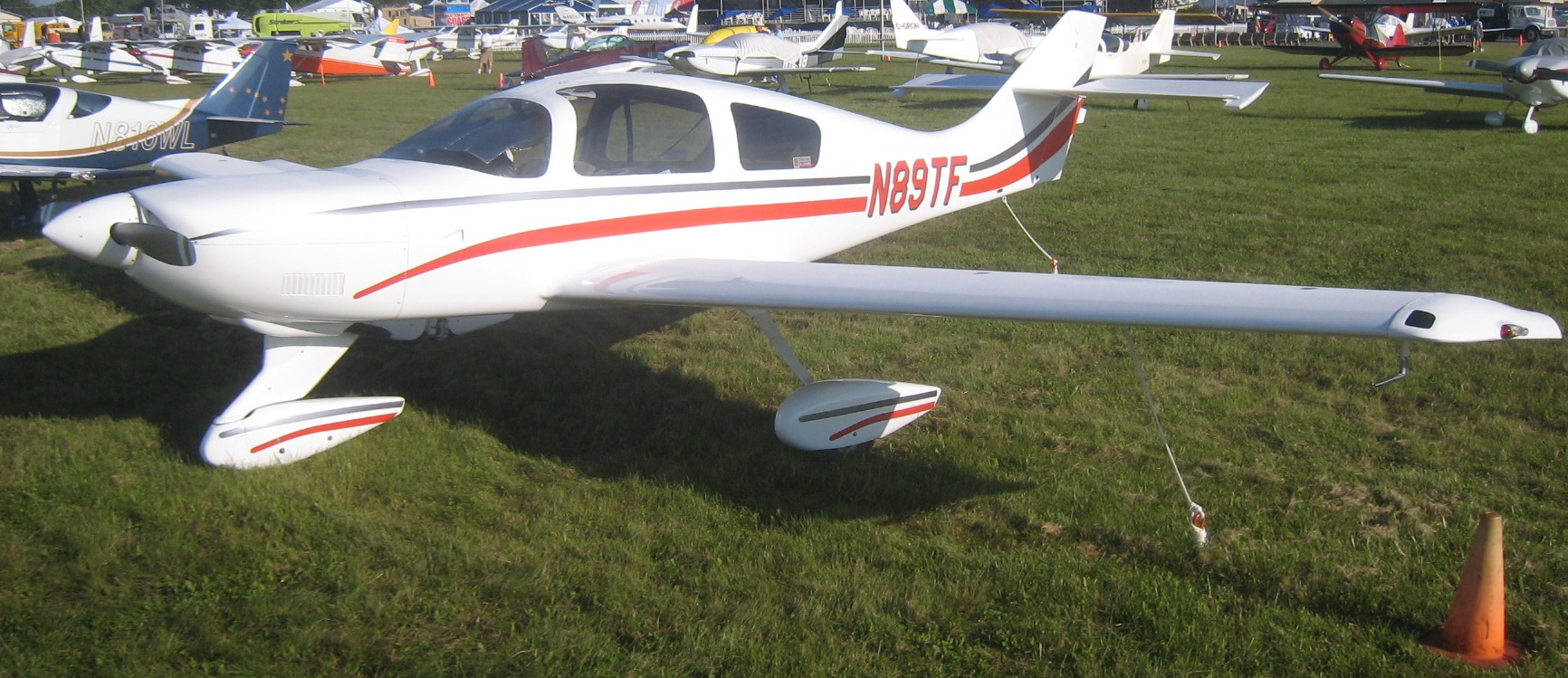

General information
- Type: Experimental Aircraft
- National origin: United States
- Manufacturer: Wheeler Technology; Express Design, Inc. Express Aircraft Company, LLC; Composite Aircraft Technology, LLC
- Designer: Ken Wheeler

History
- Introduction date: 1984
- First flight: 28 July 1987
- Variant: Express Series 90

The Wheeler Express (or later known as EDI Express) is a four-seat low-wing composite homebuilt aircraft.

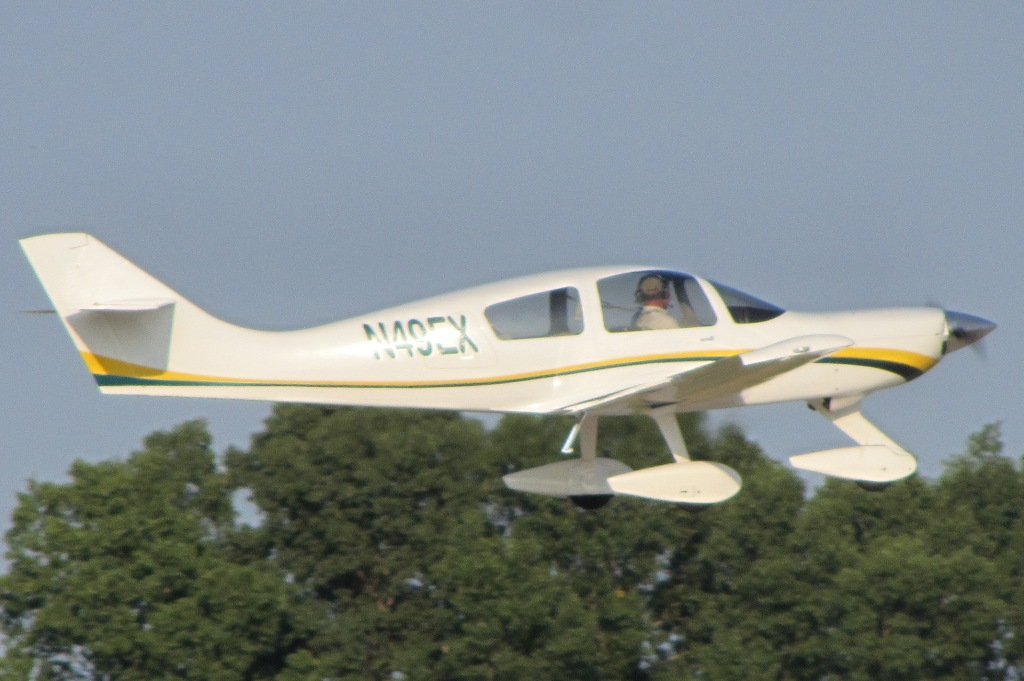
Wheeler Express takeoff

== Development ==
Designed by Ken Wheeler and developed by Wheeler Technology as a high-speed homebuilt aircraft for cross-country flights, the first of the kit built prototypes was first flown on 28 July 1987, a factory-built aircraft first flew in 1990. Wheeler Technology went into bankruptcy and the assets were bought by Express Design Incorporated (EDI) of Redmond, Oregon. Kits that were under construction were completed by EDI and they continued with kit production. A six-seat variant was produced by EDI as the Loadmaster 3200. EDI closed its doors and disconnected telephone lines after it filed for Chapter 7 bankruptcy on 6 January 1996.

In 1997, Paul Fagerstrom of Express Aircraft Company, LLC (EAC) purchased rights to the Express cruciform plans, machine tools, jigs, inventory, engineering records, and production potential. Together with Larry Olsen, daily operations manager, production was moved to Olympia, Washington. EAC planned to use subcontractors with extensive Glasair experience to build fiberglass components. EAC later became a subsidiary of Exosphere Aircraft Company, Inc. and in 2005 Madison Bay Holding, Inc. acquired a 20% stake in Exosphere.

In September 2007, Darrell Peterson, president of Composite Aircraft Technology, LLC. (CAT), purchased and acquired all assets of the former EAC through bankruptcy court. CAT moved business and production to Toledo, Washington. and provides kits, Builder Assistance Programs, and parts supply.

== Design ==
The fiberglass composite compound curved fuselage was chosen to reduce the number of stiffeners and stringers needed. The design used an unusual seating position where one rear seat faced forward and one aft to maximize interior space. The fuselage was built with similar construction methods to Glasair aircraft with a Cruciform tail. The aircraft was only produced in kit form with five main packages that included pre-cut ribs, pre-welded steel assemblies, and a spar prebonded to the upper wing surface.

The cabin width is 46 in (120 cm).

== Operational history ==
A crash of an early example of the Wheeler Express was said to demonstrate the airframe's safety due to the energy absorption during the non-fatal crash. Although the airframe is touted as being structurally sound, the National Transportation Safety Board issued a July 2015 report in which it cited pilot error and aircraft design, specifically the cruciform tail’s yaw stability, as a possible culprit to a fatal Wheeler Express accident in which the pilot failed to maintain airspeed during a maneuver resulting in a stall. All three lives were lost. Critics and Wheeler Express pilots argue that the loss of control was simply pilot error and that any plane involved in a high-angle steep turn would experience a stall below Vs, or stall speed.

== Variants ==
- Wheeler Express FT — Fixed landing gear
- Wheeler Express RG — Retractable landing gear

== Specifications ==
Source: Express Aircraft Company

Data from Cavin and Purdy

General characteristics

- Crew: one
- Capacity: three passengers
- Length: 26 ft 0 in (7.92 m)
- Wingspan: 31 ft 6 in (9.60 m)
- Wing area: 130.0 sq ft (12.08 m^{2})
- Airfoil: NASA NLF-1(0215)F
- Empty weight: 1,825 lb (828 kg)
- Gross weight: 3,200 lb (1,451 kg)
- Fuel capacity: 92 U.S. gallons (350 L; 77 imp gal)
- Powerplant: 1 × Lycoming IO-540 , 250 hp (190 kW)
- Propellers: 2-bladed constant-speed propeller

Performance

- Maximum speed: 196 kn (225 mph, 362 km/h)
- Cruise speed: 190 kn (220 mph, 350 km/h)
- Stall speed: 47 kn (54 mph, 87 km/h) flaps down
- Range: 1,600 nmi (1,800 mi, 2,900 km)
- Service ceiling: 24,000 ft (7,300 m)
- g limits: +8.8 -4.4
- Rate of climb: 1,800 ft/min (9.1 m/s)
- Wing loading: 24.6 lb/sq ft (120 kg/m^{2})
