= Raven 2XS =

Canadian aerobatic biplane

2XS

General information
- Type: Amateur-built aircraft
- National origin: Canada
- Manufacturer: Raven Aircraft
- Status: In production (2012)
- Number built: 2 (2011)

History
- Introduction date: 2009
- Developed from: Pitts Special

The Raven 2XS (English: To Excess) is a Canadian aerobatic amateur-built biplane, designed and produced by Raven Aircraft of Surrey, British Columbia. The aircraft is supplied as a kit or as plans for amateur construction.

== Design and development ==
The 2XS features a strut-braced biplane layout, a two-seats-in-tandem enclosed cockpit under a bubble canopy, fixed conventional landing gear and a single engine in tractor configuration. The cockpit is 24 in (61 cm) wide

The aircraft is made from mixed construction, using welded steel tubing, aluminum and wood, with its flying surfaces covered in doped aircraft fabric. Its 19.1 ft (5.8 m) span wing has an area of 119.4 sq ft (11.09 m^{2}). The aircraft's recommended engine power range is 260 to 400 hp (194 to 298 kW) and standard engines used include the 280 hp (209 kW) Lycoming IO-540 four-stroke powerplant. The 2XS has a roll rate of 330 degrees/second. Construction time from the supplied kit is estimated as 2000 hours.

== Operational history ==
By November 2012 one example had been registered in the United States with the Federal Aviation Administration, but none in its home country with Transport Canada.

== Specifications (2XS) ==
Data from Kitplanes and Raven Aircraft

General characteristics

- Crew: one
- Capacity: one passenger
- Length: 19 ft 4 in (5.89 m)
- Wingspan: 19 ft 2 in (5.84 m)
- Height: 6 ft 6 in (1.98 m)
- Wing area: 119.4 sq ft (11.09 m^{2})
- Empty weight: 1,180 lb (535 kg)
- Gross weight: 1,780 lb (807 kg)
- Fuel capacity: 37 U.S. gallons (140 L; 31 imp gal)
- Powerplant: 1 × Lycoming IO-540 six cylinder, air-cooled, four stroke aircraft engine, 280 hp (210 kW)
- Propellers: 3-bladed composite

Performance

- Maximum speed: 200 mph (320 km/h, 170 kn)
- Cruise speed: 188 mph (303 km/h, 163 kn)
- Stall speed: 60 mph (97 km/h, 52 kn)
- Range: 450 mi (720 km, 390 nmi)
- Rate of climb: 3,300 ft/min (17 m/s)
- Wing loading: 14.9 lb/sq ft (73 kg/m^{2})
