= Colani Cormoran =

Cormoran CCE208
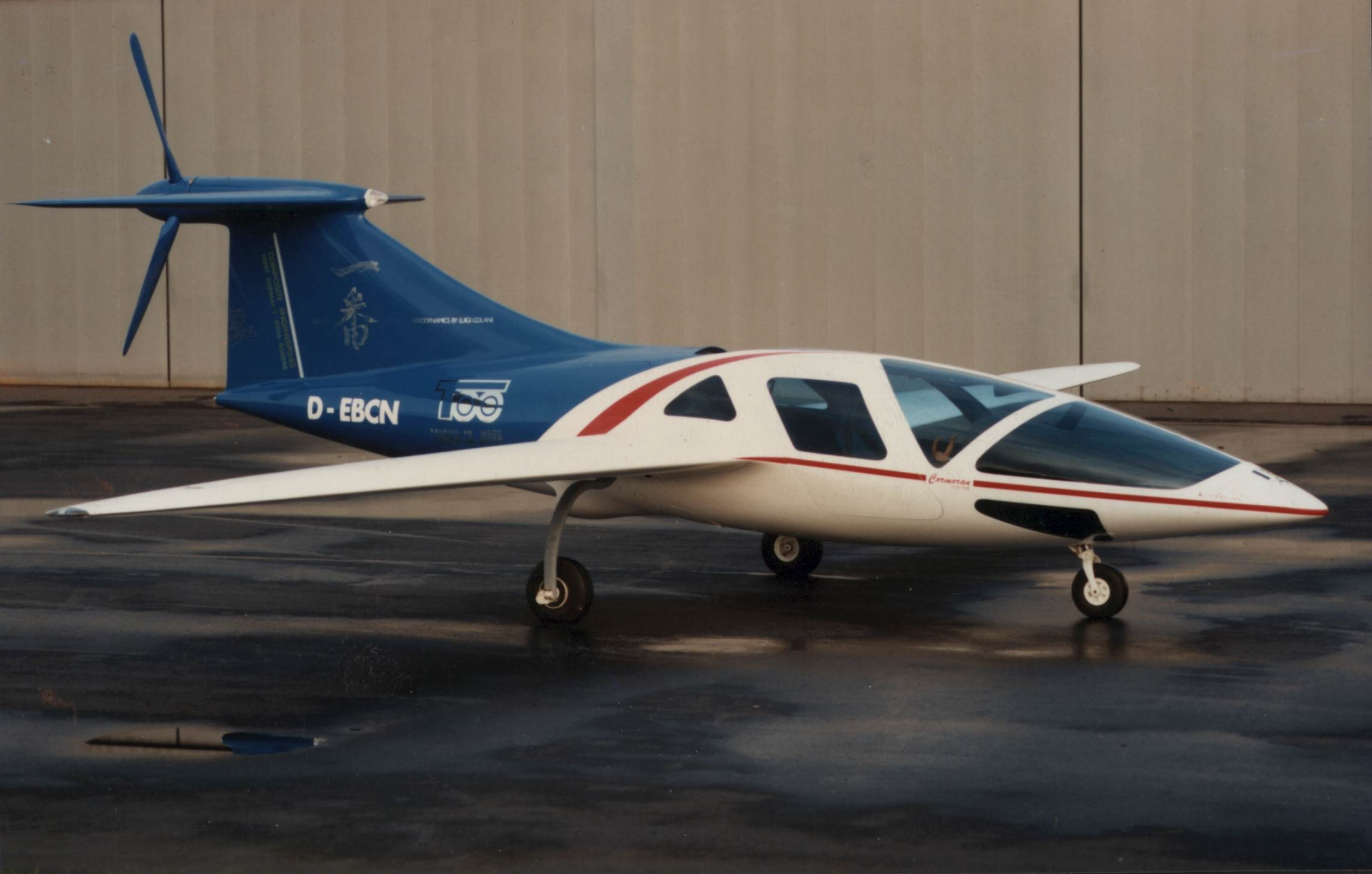

General information
- Type: Civil utility aircraft
- Manufacturer: Composite Engineering, Germany
- Designer: Walter Schulze
- Status: Mockup only

The Colani Cormoran CCE208 was a five-seat light aircraft under development in Germany in the late 1980s. The highly streamlined and unusual design was the work of the aeronautical engineer Walter Schulze with the collaboration of the celebrated industrial designer Luigi Colani. A particularly unorthodox feature was the pusher propeller mounted behind the top of the T-tail. Power was to be supplied by a converted Porsche automobile engine rated at 245 horsepower. The airframe was to be largely composite construction. A mockup was displayed at the Paris Air Show in 1987.

Construction of the prototype aircraft was to have been undertaken by the Composite Engineering Company in Germany, with financial backing from Tohshin of Japan.

== Specifications (as designed) ==
Data from Jane's All The World's Aircraft 1988-89

General characteristics

- Crew: 1
- Capacity: 4 passengers
- Length: 8.60 m (28 ft 3 in)
- Wingspan: 11.80 m (38 ft 9 in)
- Height: 3.60 m (11 ft 10 in)
- Wing area: 14.0 m^{2} (151 sq ft)
- Empty weight: 795 kg (1,753 lb)
- Gross weight: 1,500 kg (3,307 lb)
- Powerplant: 1 × Porsche PFM T03 , 183 kW (245 hp)

Performance

- Maximum speed: 445 km/h (277 mph, 240 kn)
- Range: 2,737 km (1,701 mi, 1,478 nmi)
- Service ceiling: 7,620 m (25,000 ft)
