= Performance Aircraft =

American aircraft manufacturer

- Company type: Privately held company
- Industry: Aerospace
- Defunct: circa 2001
- Headquarters: Olathe, Kansas, United States
- Key people: Jeff Ackland
- Products: Kit aircraft

Performance Aircraft was an American aircraft manufacturer based in Olathe, Kansas. The company specialized in the design and manufacture of light aircraft in the form of kits for amateur construction.

The company was formed in 1995 with designer Jeff Ackland as president. It produced two all-composite construction designs, the two-seats in side-by-side configuration Performance Aircraft Formula GT and the tandem-seat Performance Aircraft Legend and Turbine Legend.

Performance Aircraft was sold to a new company, Legend Aircraft, in 2002 and Ackland created his own new company, Midwest Aerosport, to continue development of the Formula GT.

== Aircraft ==
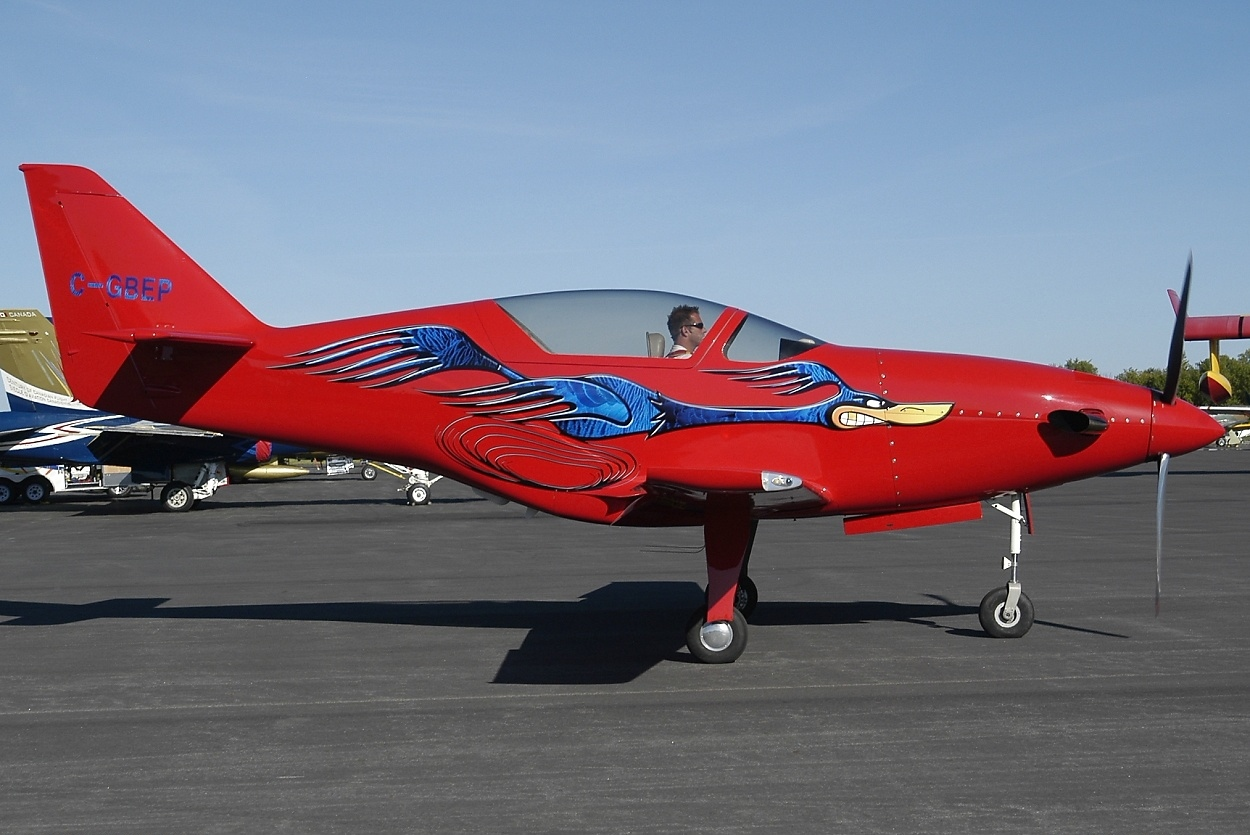
Performance Aircraft Turbine Legend

Summary of aircraft built by Performance Aircraft
Model name	First flight	Number built	Type
Performance Aircraft Legend			Two seat homebuilt aircraft
Performance Aircraft Formula GT		at least one	Two seat homebuilt aircraft
