= Celair Eagle 300 =

1990s South African prototype for light aircraft

Eagle 300

General information
- Type: General aviation light aircraft
- National origin: South Africa
- Manufacturer: Celair (Pty) Limited
- Designer: Pieter Celliers
- Number built: 1

History
- First flight: 4 April 1990

The Celair Eagle 300 was a light aircraft with STOL capability developed in South Africa in the late 1980s and early 1990s. Only a single prototype was constructed.

== Design ==
The Eagle 300 was a strut-braced, high-wing monoplane of conventional design. The pilot and up to five passengers sat in an enclosed cabin, but the passenger seats were removable to make room for cargo. It had a conventional tail and was equipped with fixed, tailwheel undercarriage. The portside, rear fuselage incorporated a large, upward hinging door for cargo loading.

The central fuselage was built from a steel tube structure, and the wings had a single steel spar, but otherwise, the Eagle 300 was constructed largely of composite materials. A honeycomb of low-pressure/elevated-temperature (LPET) fibreglass and Nomex honeycomb was used throughout.

== Development ==
Pieter Celliers' firm Celair was the South African distributor for Christen and Pitts. In August 1987, Celliers engaged the South African government's Council for Scientific and Industrial Research (CSIR) to develop a 4-6 seat aircraft that was simple and rugged.

Celliers wanted to use composite materials for construction, and developed a sailplane, the Celair GA-1, in parallel with the Eagle to validate construction methods. When the GA-1 proved successful, he began construction of the Eagle at Celair's Roodewal factory near Ermelo.

The prototype, registered ZS-WLD, made its first flight on 4 April 1990. Shortly after this, Celliers displayed it at the Aviation Africa 90 trade show at Rand Airport.

Celliers' plans for the Eagle were to obtain American FAR 23 and South African DCA certification and to put it into production by 1992.

By 1993, development had ceased and Celair was out of business. In February 1993, the rights to the Eagle design were put up for sale.

== Specifications ==
Data from Lambert, Munson & Taylor 1992, p.263

General characteristics

- Crew: 1 pilot
- Capacity: 5 passengers
- Length: 7.90 m (25 ft 11 in)
- Wingspan: 11.20 m (36 ft 9 in)
- Height: 2.50 m (8 ft 2 in)
- Wing area: 16.20 m^{2} (174.4 sq ft)
- Empty weight: 900 kg (1,984 lb)
- Max takeoff weight: 1,750 kg (3,858 lb)
- Powerplant: 1 × Textron Lycoming IO-540-K six-cylinder, horizontally-opposed, air-cooled piston engine, 220 kW (300 hp)

Performance

- Maximum speed: 300 km/h (190 mph, 160 kn) at speed level
- Cruise speed: 259 km/h (161 mph, 140 kn) at sea level
- Range: 1,090 km (680 mi, 590 nmi) with 15% reserves
- Rate of climb: 6.75 m/s (1,329 ft/min)

== Notes ==
=== Bibliography ===
- "Airscene Headlines". Air International. Vol. 52, no. 8. Stamford, Lincolnshire: Key Publishing. February 1993. pp. 58–64.
- Becker, Dave (August 1990). "The Celair Eagle 300". Air Pictorial. Vol. 52, no. 8. Ascot, Berkshire: Profile Books. p. 288.
- "Celair starts Eagle test program". Flight International. Surrey: Reed Business Publishing. 11–13 June 1990. p. 20.
- "Flugerprobung" [Flight testing]. Flug Revue. No. 8. Stuttgart: Motor Press. 1990. p. 21.
- Lambert, Mark; Munson, Kenneth; Taylor, Michael J.H., eds. (1992). Jane's All the World's Aircraft 1992-93 (83rd ed.). Coulson, Surrey, UK: Jane's Information Group.
- Taylor, Michael J. H. (1993). Jane's Encyclopedia of Aviation. London: Studio Editions.
- Taylor, Michael J.H.; Lambert, Mark; Munson, Kenneth, eds. (1993). Jane's All the World's Aircraft 1993-94 (84th ed.). Coulson, Surrey, UK: Jane's Information Group.
