= Express Series 90 =

American homebuilt aircraft

Series 90

General information
- Type: Homebuilt aircraft
- National origin: United States
- Manufacturer: Express Aircraft Company
- Status: Production completed

History
- Introduction date: late 1980s
- Developed from: Wheeler Express

The Express Series 90 is an American homebuilt aircraft that was designed and produced by the Express Aircraft Company of Olympia, Washington, introduced in the late 1980s. When it was available the aircraft was supplied as a kit for amateur construction.

== Design and development ==
The Express Series 90 is a development of the earlier Wheeler Express designed by Ken Wheeler. It incorporates a 20% larger tail which gives it a wider center of gravity range, while also enhancing pitch and yaw stability.

The aircraft features a cantilever low-wing, a four-seat enclosed cabin, fixed tricycle landing gear with wheel pants and a single engine in tractor configuration.

The Series 90 is made from composites. Its 31.00 ft (9.4 m) span wing mounts flaps and has a wing area of 130.00 sq ft (12.077 m^{2}). The cabin width is 46 in (120 cm). The standard engine used is the 300 hp (224 kW) Lycoming IO-540 four stroke, air-cooled, six cylinder powerplant.

The aircraft has a typical empty weight of 1,840 lb (830 kg) and a gross weight of 3,200 lb (1,500 kg), giving a useful load of 1,360 lb (620 kg). With full fuel of 92 U.S. gallons (350 L; 77 imp gal) the payload for pilot, passengers and baggage is 808 lb (367 kg).

The manufacturer estimated the construction time from the supplied kit as 2000 hours.

== Operational history ==
In December 2013 three examples were registered in the United States with the Federal Aviation Administration.

== Specifications (Series 90) ==
Data from AeroCrafter

General characteristics

- Crew: one
- Capacity: three passengers
- Length: 25 ft 0 in (7.62 m)
- Wingspan: 31 ft 0 in (9.45 m)
- Wing area: 130.0 sq ft (12.08 m^{2})
- Empty weight: 1,840 lb (835 kg)
- Gross weight: 3,200 lb (1,451 kg)
- Fuel capacity: 92 U.S. gallons (350 L; 77 imp gal)
- Powerplant: 1 × Lycoming IO-540 six cylinder, air-cooled, four stroke aircraft engine, 300 hp (220 kW)
- Propellers: 3-bladed constant speed propeller

Performance

- Cruise speed: 210 mph (340 km/h, 180 kn)
- Stall speed: 57 mph (92 km/h, 50 kn) flaps down
- Range: 1,360 mi (2,190 km, 1,180 nmi)
- Wing loading: 24.6 lb/sq ft (120 kg/m^{2})
