= PAF XT-001 Marko 1 =

XT-001 Marko 1

General information
- Type: Basic trainer aircraft
- National origin: Philippines
- Manufacturer: Philippine Air Force
- Status: Cancelled
- Primary user: Philippine Air Force
- Number built: 1 prototype

History
- First flight: 21 May 1975
- Developed from: SIAI-Marchetti SF.260MP

The PAF XT-001 Marko 1 was a basic trainer aircraft developed by the Philippine Air Force Self-Reliance Development Wing (PAFSRDW).

== Design and development ==
It was designed and built by the Self-Reliance Development Wing of the Philippine Air Force in 1975 from locally designed jigs and fixtures. It closely resembles the SIAI-Marchetti SF.260MP trainer, but with modified wingtips and cockpit. The prototype was initially thought to be a modified SF.260MP. Comparison of data with those for the SF.260MP indicates a slight increase in wingspan (though not in gross wing area), a lower empty weight, and (despite a similar powerplant and identical maximum takeoff weight) a slightly reduced performance. The first test flight was on May 21, 1975.

== Operators ==
Philippines

- Philippine Air Force

== Specifications ==
Data from Jane's All The World's Aircraft 1978–79

General characteristics

- Crew: 2
- Length: 7.1 m (23 ft 4 in)
- Wingspan: 8.4 m (27 ft 7 in)
- Height: 2.4 m (7 ft 10 in)
- Wing area: 10.10 m^{2} (108.7 sq ft)
- Empty weight: 720 kg (1,587 lb)
- Max takeoff weight: 1,200 kg (2,646 lb)
- Powerplant: 1 × Lycoming O-540-E4A5 6-cylinder air-cooled horizontally-opposed piston engine, 194 kW (260 hp)
- Propellers: 2-bladed propeller

Performance

- Maximum speed: 260 km/h (160 mph, 140 kn)
- Stall speed: 120 km/h (75 mph, 65 kn)

== See also ==
- PAF XT-004 Layang

Aircraft of comparable role, configuration, and era

- SIAI-Marchetti SF.260MP

Related lists

- List of aircraft (P)
