= PAF XT-004 Layang =

XT-004 Layang

General information
- Type: Basic trainer aircraft
- National origin: Philippines
- Manufacturer: Philippine Air Force
- Status: Cancelled
- Primary user: Philippine Air Force
- Number built: 1 prototype

History
- First flight: 21 July 1996
- Developed from: SIAI-Marchetti SF.260

The PAF XT-004 Layang was a basic trainer aircraft developed by the Philippine Air Force's Air Force Research and Development Center (AFRDC).

== Design and development ==
After an intensified and revitalized self-reliance program in 1996, the XT-004 project, code-named "Layang", was developed by the PAFRDC in Villamor Air Base, Pasay. It is a single-engine aircraft powered by a 350 hp Allison Model 250-B17D turboshaft engine and is constructed from aluminum with a semi-monocoque structure. According to the PAFRDC, the aircraft jigs and fixtures have already been built since 1985, but lack of funds hindered the completion of the project.

== Operators ==
Philippines

- Philippine Air Force

== See also ==
- PAF XT-001 Marko 1

Aircraft of comparable role, configuration, and era

- SIAI-Marchetti SF.260

Related lists

- List of aircraft (P)
