= Evangel 4500 =

American twin-engined light aircraft

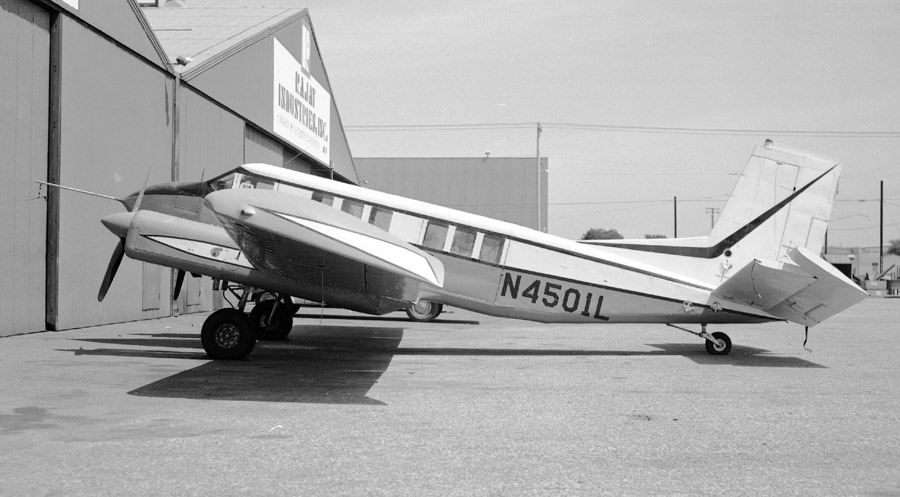

General information
- Type: Light passenger/cargo
- National origin: United States
- Manufacturer: Evangel Aircraft Corporation
- Number built: 8

History
- Introduction date: 1969
- First flight: June 1964

The Evangel 4500 was a 1960s American twin-engined light passenger/cargo monoplane built by the Evangel Aircraft Corporation.

== Development ==
The Evangel Aircraft Corporation was established to design and build a bush aircraft particularly for use by missionary groups. For work in South America it had to have STOL capability and be simple to operate and maintain. The aircraft that was designed was designated the Evangel 4500-300 and was a twin-engined monoplane with a tailwheel configuration retractable landing gear. The prototype first flew in June 1964 and the first production aircraft in January 1969. The aircraft needs a very short take-off run and can achieve a take-off to 50ft (15m) within 375yds (343m).

== Variants ==
4500
The sole prototype, with a high strut braced wing and tricycle undercarriage.
4500-300
Production variant
4500-300-II
Used to identify aircraft fitted with turbochargers.

== Specifications ==
Data from Jane's All The World's Aircraft 1971–72.

General characteristics

- Crew: 1
- Capacity: 8 passengers
- Length: 31 ft 6 in (9.60 m)
- Wingspan: 41 ft 3 in (12.57 m)
- Height: 9 ft 6 in (2.90 m)
- Wing area: 251 sq ft (23.3 m^{2})
- Aspect ratio: 6.83:1
- Airfoil: NACA 63-618 (modified)
- Empty weight: 3,455 lb (1,567 kg)
- Max takeoff weight: 5,500 lb (2,495 kg)
- Fuel capacity: 111 US gal (92 imp gal; 420 L)
- Powerplant: 2 × Avco Lycoming IO-540-K1B5 air-cooled flat-six piston engines, 300 hp (220 kW) each
- Propellers: 2-bladed Hartzell, 6 ft 8 in (2.03 m) diameter

Performance

- Maximum speed: 230 mph (370 km/h, 200 kn)
- Cruise speed: 175 mph (282 km/h, 152 kn) at 10,000 ft (3,050 m) (econ. cruise, 65% power)
- Stall speed: 67 mph (108 km/h, 58 kn) (flaps down)
- Range: 700 mi (1,100 km, 610 nmi) at 10,000 ft (3,050 m) (65% power)
- Service ceiling: 21,030 ft (6,410 m)
- Rate of climb: 1,500 ft/min (7.6 m/s)
- Takeoff run to 50 ft (15 m): 1,125 ft (343 m)
- Landing run from 50 ft (15 m): 1,140 ft (347 m)

== See also ==
Aircraft of comparable role, configuration, and era

- Helio Twin Courier
