= Ruschmeyer R 90 =

Four-seat light aircraft

R 90
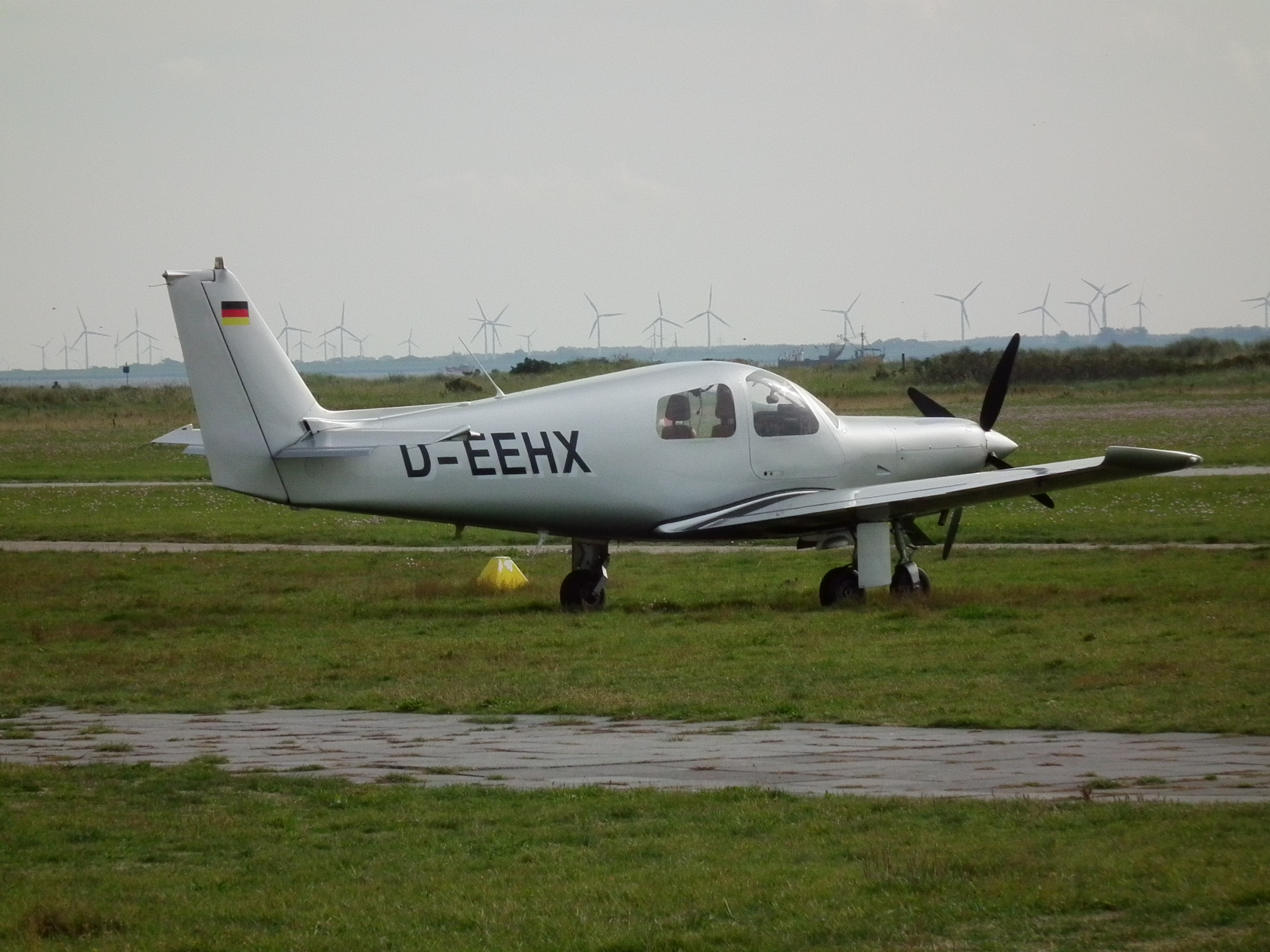

General information
- Type: Light touring aircraft
- National origin: Germany
- Manufacturer: Ruschmeyer Luftfahrttechnik
- Number built: MF-85:3; R-90:~30

History
- First flight: 8 August 1988 (MF-85)

The Ruschmeyer R 90 is a four-seat light aircraft designed and produced in Germany in the late 1980s and early 1990s.

== Design and development ==
=== MF-85 ===
Ruschmeyer Luftfahrttechnik initially designed the Ruschmeyer MF-85, intended to be powered by Porsche PFM 3200 derivatives, which was debuted at the 1987 Hannover Air Show. The MF-85 was a composite four seat aircraft, planned to be offered with 134 to 183 kW (180 to 245 hp) engines, priced at DM245,000 to DM325,000 (excluding avionics), with optional fixed or retractable undercarriage. The prototype (V001 D-EEHE) first flew with a 212 hp (158 kW) Porsche PFM 3200N, driving a 3-bladed Mühlbauer MTV.9 constant speed propeller, on 8 August 1988, piloted by Horst Ruschmeyer. The second and third aircraft, V002 (D-EERO) and V003 (D-EERH), on flew on 23 September 1990 and 12 February 1992 respectively. Despite promising flight test results, the unavailability of Porsche engines led to the development of the Textron Lycoming powered R 90.

=== R 90 ===
Powered by a Lycoming IO-540-C4D5 driving a Mühlbauer MTV.14-B constant speed propeller, the production R 90-230RG was built from 1988 to the mid-1990s in Germany. The engine is de-rated to 172 kW (231 hp) to reduce noise, but still enables the R 90 to reach a maximum cruising speed of 324 km/h (175 kn; 201 mph).

German certification was awarded in June 1992, with 28 production aircraft built when Ruschmeyer Luftfahrttechnik filed for bankruptcy in June 1996. In 1999, the assets of Ruschmeyer were purchased by Solaris Aviation of West Palm Beach, Florida, marketing the R90 as the Solaris Sigma. In 2004, the project passed to Aircraft Technology Consulting, which restarted production in Germany, building two more aircraft by mid 2005.

== Variants ==
Data from:

MF-85
The first three prototypes powered by Porsche PFM 3200 engines.
R 90
Production aircraft powered by Lycoming IO-540-C4D5 engines

R 90-230-RG: The main variant with retractable undercarriage
R 90-230-FG: Variant with fixed undercarriage, powered by Lycoming O-540-J engines.
R 90-180-FG: Variant with fixed undercarriage, powered by Lycoming IO-360 engines.
R 90-350T-RG: High performance variant with retractable undercarriage, powered by 185 kW (248 hp) turbo-charged engines.
R 90-420AT-RG:High performance variant with retractable undercarriage, powered by Allison 250-B17 turboprop engines

R 95
5/6 seat variant with retractable undercarriage.
Solaris Sigma
Production and marketing in the United States

== Specifications (R 90-230 RG) ==
Data from Jane's All The World's Aircraft 1993-94

General characteristics

- Crew: 1
- Capacity: 3 passengers
- Length: 7.93 m (26 ft 0 in)
- Wingspan: 9.50 m (31 ft 2 in)
- Height: 1.24 m (4 ft 1 in)
- Wing area: 12.94 m^{2} (139.3 sq ft)
- Empty weight: 898 kg (1,980 lb)
- Max takeoff weight: 1,350 kg (2,976 lb)
- Powerplant: 1 × Lycoming IO-540-C4D5 six-cylinder. air-cooled horizontally-opposed piston engine, 170 kW (230 hp)
- Propellers: 4-bladed Mühlbauer MTV-14-B constant speed propeller, 1.88 m (6 ft 2 in) diameter

Performance

- Maximum speed: 322 km/h (200 mph, 174 kn) at 3,000 m (10,000 ft)
- Stall speed: 108 km/h (67 mph, 58 kn) in landing configuration
- Range: 2,740 km (1,700 mi, 1,480 nmi) 45% power at 915 m (3,002 ft)
- Service ceiling: 4,900 m (16,060 ft)
- Rate of climb: 5.8 m/s (1,140 ft/min)
