= Starfire Firebolt =

American homebuilt aircraft

Firebolt
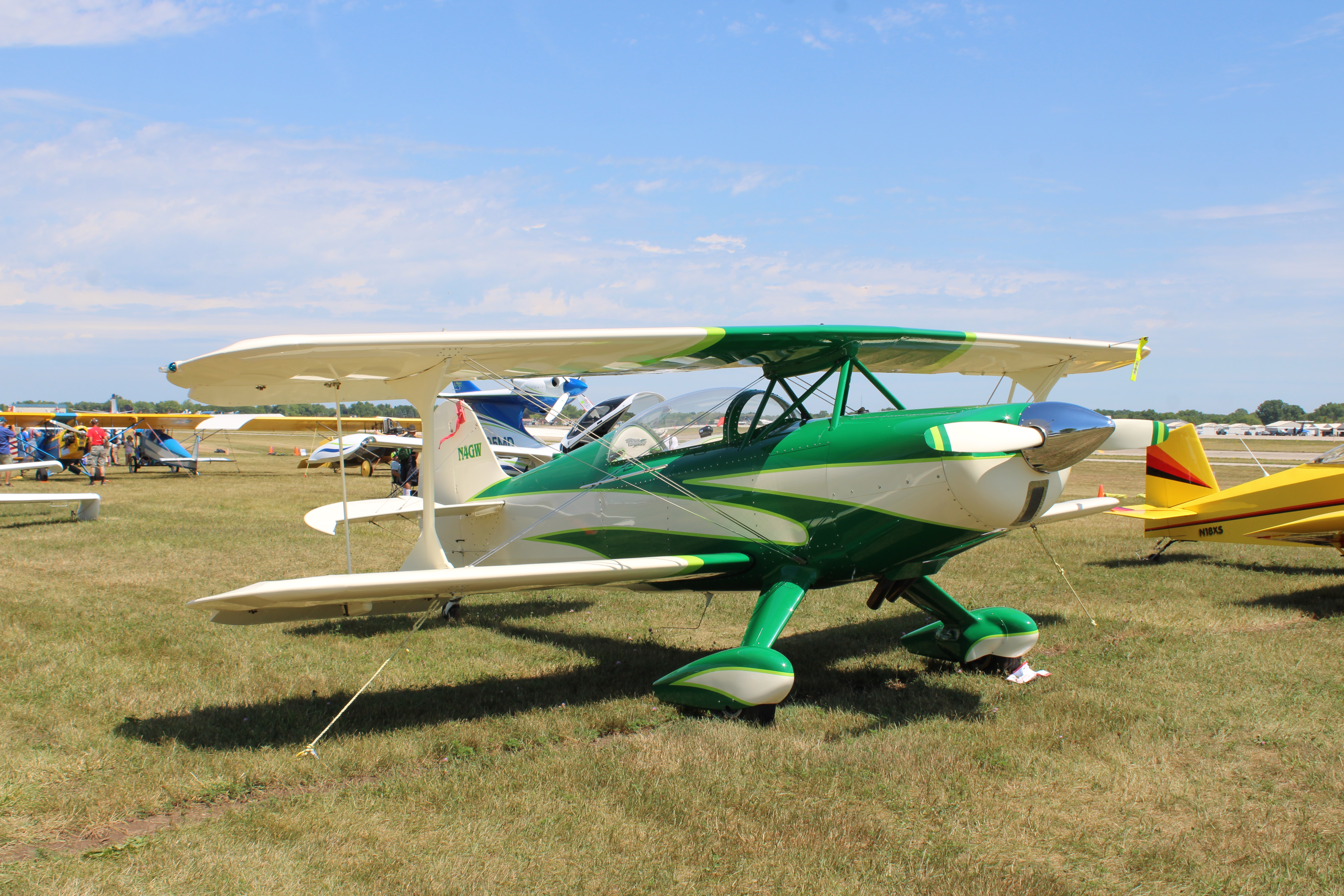

General information
- Type: Homebuilt aircraft
- National origin: United States
- Manufacturer: Starfire Aviation
- Designer: G. H. "Mac" McKenzie
- Status: Production completed
- Number built: At least nine

History
- Developed from: Steen Skybolt

The Starfire Firebolt, sometimes called the Starfire Firebolt Convertible due to its removable canopy, is an American homebuilt aerobatic biplane that was designed by G. H. "Mac" McKenzie and produced by Starfire Aviation of Tempe, Arizona. When it was available the aircraft was supplied in the form of plans for amateur construction, with some pre-fabricated parts available.

== Design and development ==
The Firebolt was developed from the Steen Skybolt and features a biplane layout with interplane struts, cabane struts and flying wires, a two-seats-in-tandem open, or optionally, enclosed cockpit under a bubble canopy that slides back, fixed conventional landing gear with wheel pants and a single engine in tractor configuration.

The aircraft is made of mixed construction, with a welded steel tubing, aluminum and wooden structure, all covered in doped aircraft fabric. Its 24.00 ft (7.3 m) span wing employs a NACA 63A015/0012 airfoil and has a wing area of 150.0 sq ft (13.94 m^{2}). The cockpit width is 29 in (74 cm). The acceptable power range is 180 to 300 hp (134 to 224 kW) and the standard engine used is the 300 hp (224 kW) Lycoming IO-540 powerplant. With that engine the aircraft has a cruise speed of 202 mph (325 km/h) and an initial climb rate of 4,000 ft/min (20 m/s).

The Firebolt has a typical empty weight of 1,325 lb (601 kg) and a gross weight of 2,000 lb (910 kg), giving a useful load of 675 lb (306 kg). With full fuel of 39 U.S. gallons (150 L; 32 imp gal) the payload for the pilot, passenger and baggage is 441 lb (200 kg).

The standard day, sea level, no wind, take off with a 300 hp (224 kW) engine is 400 ft (122 m) and the landing roll is 800 ft (244 m).

The manufacturer estimated the construction time from the supplied plans as 3000 hours.

== Operational history ==
By 1998 the company reported that six aircraft were completed and flying.

In March 2014 eight examples were registered in the United States with the Federal Aviation Administration, although a total of nine had been registered at one time.

== Specifications (Firebolt) ==
Data from AeroCrafter, All-Aero and The Incomplete Guide to Airfoil Usage

General characteristics

- Crew: one
- Capacity: one passenger
- Length: 21 ft 3 in (6.48 m)
- Wingspan: 24 ft 0 in (7.32 m)
- Height: 7 ft 7 in (2.31 m)
- Wing area: 150.0 sq ft (13.94 m^{2})
- Airfoil: NACA 63A015/0012
- Empty weight: 1,325 lb (601 kg)
- Gross weight: 2,000 lb (907 kg)
- Fuel capacity: 39 U.S. gallons (150 L; 32 imp gal)
- Powerplant: 1 × Lycoming IO-540 six cylinder, air-cooled, four stroke aircraft engine, 300 hp (220 kW)
- Propellers: 2-bladed constant speed propeller

Performance

- Maximum speed: 235 mph (378 km/h, 204 kn)
- Cruise speed: 202 mph (325 km/h, 176 kn)
- Stall speed: 62 mph (100 km/h, 54 kn)
- Range: 500 mi (800 km, 430 nmi)
- Service ceiling: 18,000 ft (5,500 m)
- Rate of climb: 4,000 ft/min (20 m/s)
- Wing loading: 13.3 lb/sq ft (65 kg/m^{2})

== See also ==
- List of aerobatic aircraft
