= Performance Turbine Legend =

American homebuilt aircraft

Legend
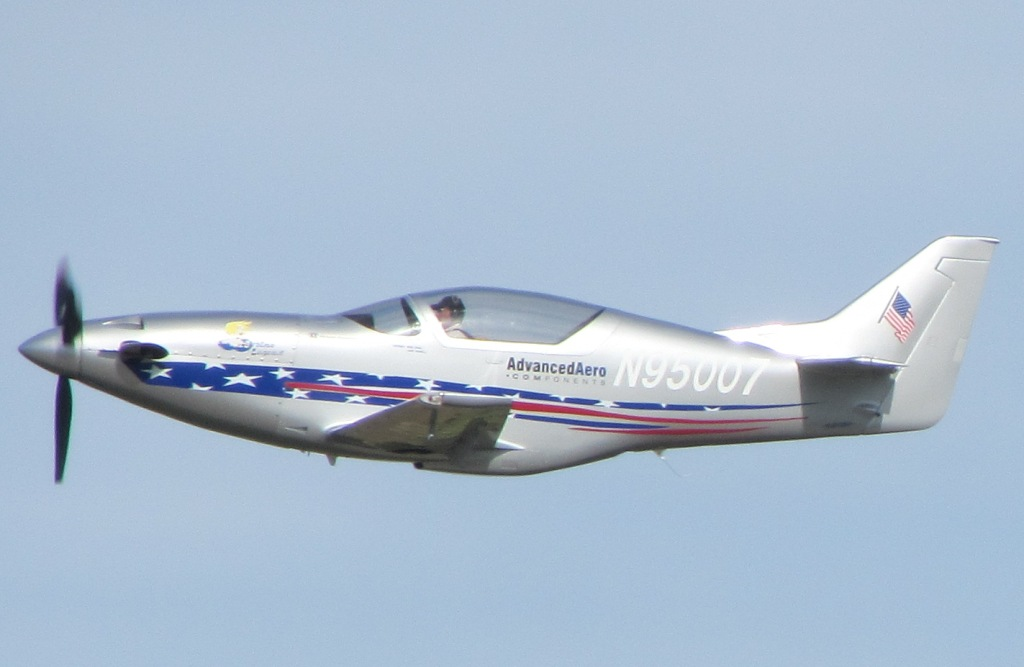
- Turbine Legend

General information
- Type: Homebuilt sportplane
- National origin: United States
- Manufacturer: Performance Aircraft; Legend Aircraft
- Designer: Jeff Ackland
- Number built: 28 (March 2020)

History
- First flight: 1996

The Performance Turbine Legend is an American sports monoplane designed by Performance Aircraft for sale as a kit for amateur construction.

== Design and development ==
The Legend is a streamlined low-wing monoplane mainly constructed of carbon-fiber-reinforced polymer. It has swept-back tail surfaces with a mid-mounted tailplane and tapered wings, with optional winglets. The prototype was powered by a 575 hp (429 kW) Chevrolet V-8 engine with a three-bladed tractor propeller and a ventral air-scoop, the Turbine Legend has a 724 shp (540 kW) Walter M601 turboprop with a three-bladed tractor propeller. The Legend has a retractable tricycle landing gear; the mainwheels retract inwards and the nosewheel rearwards. The enclosed cockpit has room for two persons in tandem seats with dual controls and has a rear-hinged, upward-opening, canopy with a fixed windscreen.

The Legend was first flown in 1996 by Performance Aircraft and the prototype was converted into a Turbine Legend in 1999.

The assets of Performance Aircraft were taken over by Lanny Rundell to be marketed by Legend Aircraft of Winnsboro, Louisiana.

== Operational history ==
In a March 2020 review for Kitplanes, writer Doug Rozendaal described the takeoff: "the acceleration is like a jet fighter." He also praised the handling and the fit and finish of the design.

== Variants ==
Legend
Piston-engined variant, powered by a 575 shp (429 kW) Chevrolet V-8 automotive conversion piston engine.

Turbine Legend
Turboprop-engined variant, powered by a 724 shp (540 kW) Walter M601 turboprop engine.

JC 100
A Turbine Legend built by Toys 4 Boys in 2000, designated the JC 100

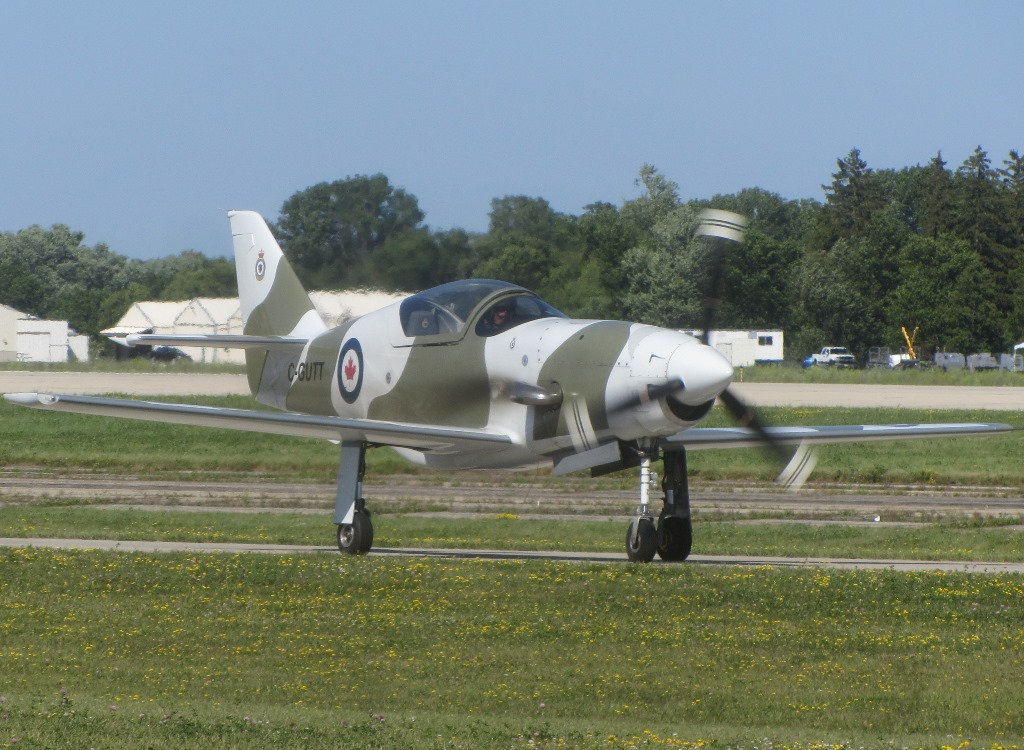
Garrett Turbine Legend

Turbine Legend (Garrett Edition)
A Turbine Legend was built by Innovative Wings Inc. utilizing a 1,100 hp (820 kW) Garrett TPE331-10 engine.

Turbine Legend Venom
A military version marketed by Venom Military Aircraft and intended for the training and light attack roles. It has a 750 shp (559 kW) GE H75 engine, major changes to the wing design, a carbon fiber composite structure, fuel capacity increased to 145 U.S. gallons (550 L; 121 imp gal), full digital panel, electric remote canopy, aft spar flaps system and electric Fowler flaps. No sales have yet been announced.

== Specifications (Turbine Legend) ==
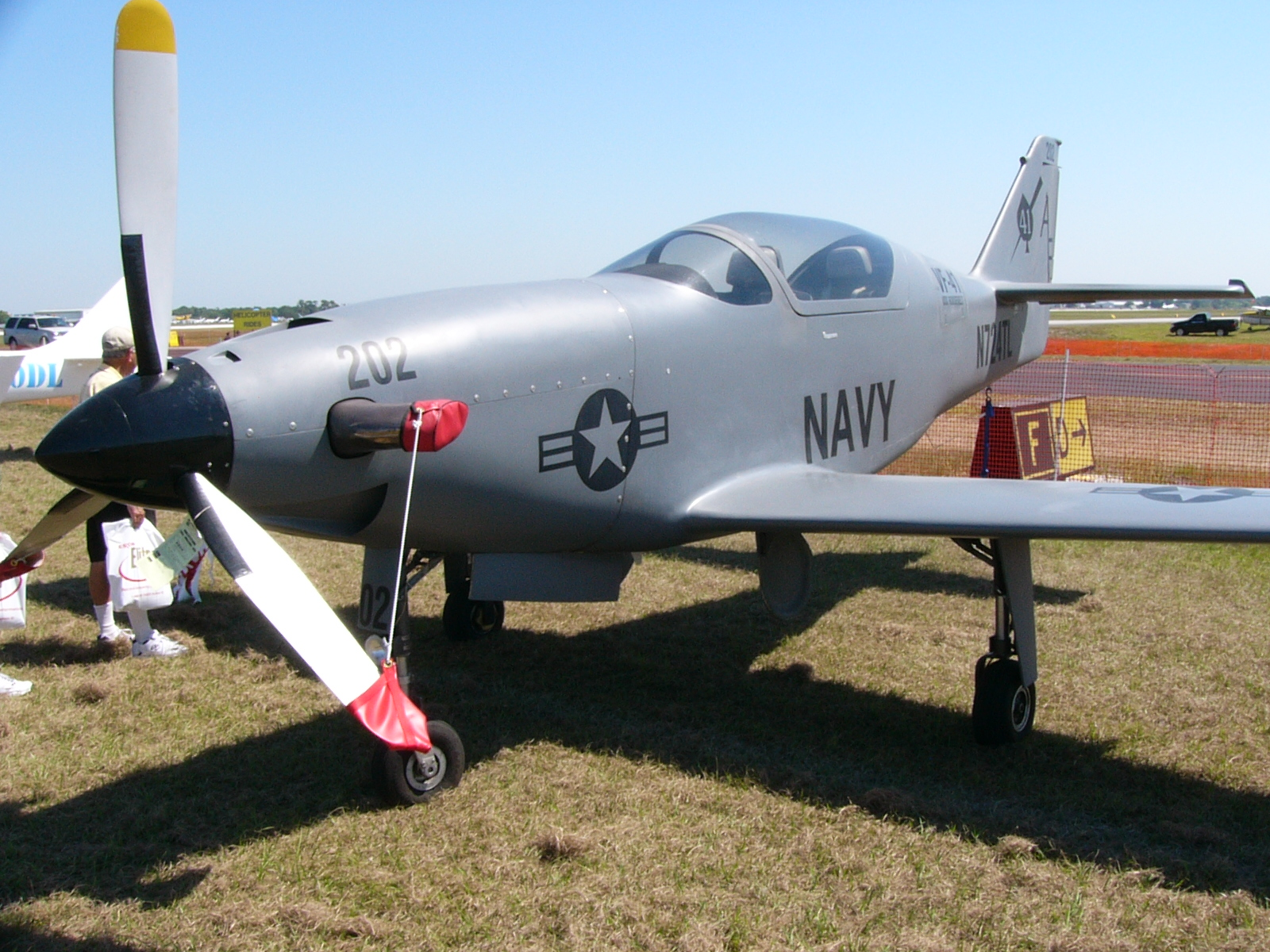
Turbine Legend

Data from Jane's All the World's Aircraft 2003-2004.

General characteristics

- Crew: 2
- Length: 25 ft 9 in (7.84 m)
- Wingspan: 28 ft 6 in (8.69 m)
- Height: 9 ft 5 in (2.86 m)
- Wing area: 101.0 sq ft (9.38 m^{2})
- Aspect ratio: 8.0
- Empty weight: 2,050 lb (930 kg)
- Max takeoff weight: 3,298 lb (1,496 kg)
- Powerplant: 1 × Walter M601 Turboprop, 720 hp (540 kW)
- Propellers: 3-bladed Avia V 508E/84

Performance

- Maximum speed: 356 mph (573 km/h, 309 kn)
- Cruise speed: 334 mph (537 km/h, 290 kn) maximum at 25000 ft (7620 m)
- Stall speed: 76 mph (123 km/h, 66 kn) landing configuration
- Never exceed speed: 400 mph (643 km/h, 347 kn)
- Range: 940 mi (1,520 km, 820 nmi) at max cruising speed with standard fuel and reserves
- Service ceiling: 35,010 ft (10,670 m)
- g limits: +6/-4
- Rate of climb: 6,500 ft/min (33 m/s)
- Wing loading: 32.67 lb/sq ft (159.5 kg/m^{2})
