= Lycoming O-540 =

Family of flat-six piston aircraft engines

O-540
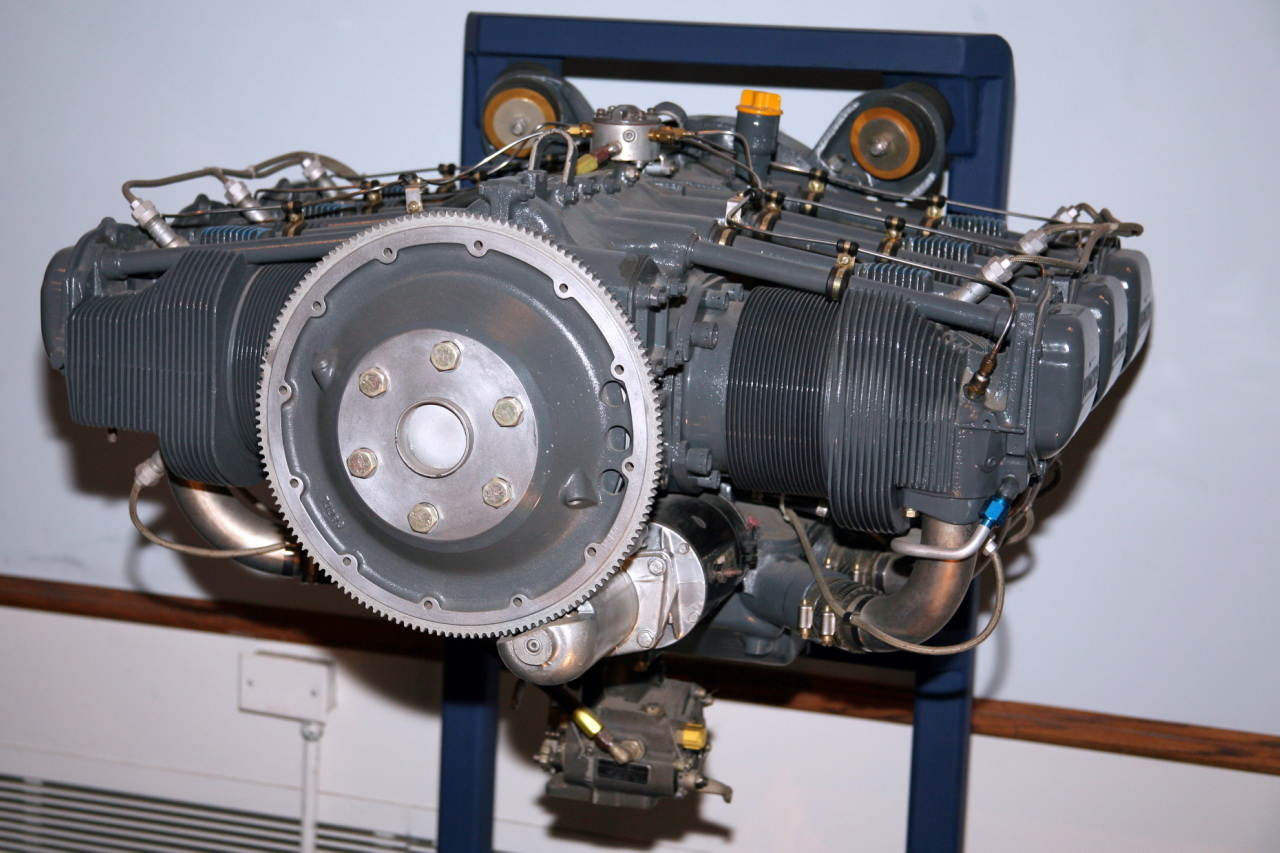
- AEIO-540
- Type: Certified Piston aircraft engine
- National origin: United States
- Manufacturer: Lycoming Engines
- First run: 1957; 1963 (injected version)
- Major applications: Britten-Norman Islander; Cessna 182; Cessna 206; Grob G 120; HAL HPT-32 Deepak; Piper PA-46; Robinson R44; Piper PA-31 Navajo; Embraer EMB 202 Ipanema
- Manufactured: 1957–present
- Developed from: Lycoming O-360

The Lycoming O-540 is a family of air-cooled six-cylinder, horizontally opposed fixed-wing aircraft and helicopter engines of 541.5 cubic inches (8.9 L) displacement, manufactured by Lycoming Engines. The engine is a six-cylinder version of the four-cylinder Lycoming O-360.

== Design and development ==
Producing between 230 and 350 horsepower (170 and 260 kW) these engines are installed in a large variety of aircraft. The main competitors are the Continental IO-520 and IO-550 series.

An AEIO version was developed for high-performance competition aerobatics aircraft. Starting at 260 hp (190 kW) the power was eventually increased to 300 hp (220 kW). The AEIO-540 family has achieved considerable success in aircraft such as the Extra 300, CAP 232, and Zivko Edge 540.

== Variants ==
All engines have an additional prefix preceding the 540 to indicate the specific configuration of the engine. The numerous engine suffixes denote different accessories such as different manufacturers' carburetors, or different magnetos.

O-540
Standard, direct-drive, normally aspirated Opposed engine, equipped with a carburetor

IO-540
Normally aspirated engine with continuous fuel Injection

AEIO-540
Normally aspirated engine with fuel injection and inverted lubrication for Aerobatic use

TIO-540
Turbocharged and fuel-injected

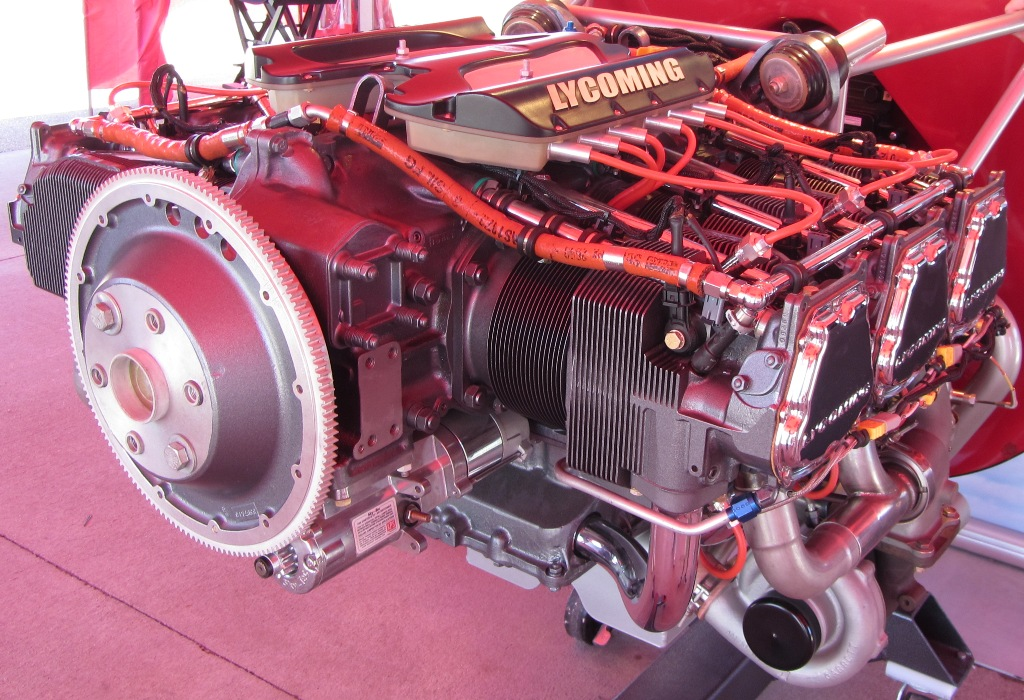
Lycoming TEO-540

TEO-540
Turbocharged with a FADEC control system using Lycoming's iE2 system, offering independent Electronic sensors and fuel injection controls for each cylinder, which manage detonation and exhaust gas temperature, make the engine compatible with a range of fuel compositions, producing up to 375 hp (280 kW).

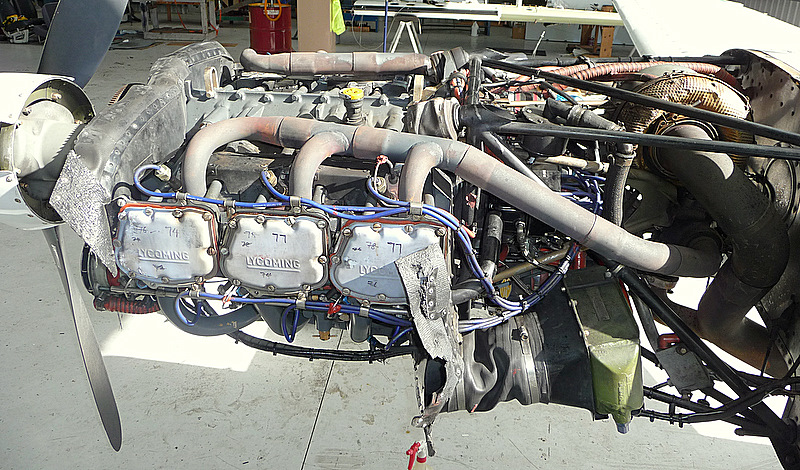
An LTIO-540 mounted on the right wing of a Piper Chieftain: The turbocharger can be seen in the upper right of the image.

LTIO-540
Left-hand (opposite-direction) rotation, turbocharged, fuel-injected; used as the right-hand engine on Piper PA-31-325 Navajo C/Rs and Piper PA-31-350 Chieftains to prevent critical engine control issues, and used for the left side of the Aerostar 700P

IGO-540
Gearbox at the front end of the crankshaft to drive the propeller at fewer revolutions per minute than the engine, normally aspirated with fuel injection, dry sump engine built specifically for the Aero Commander 560F

TIGO-540
Turbo-charged, injected and geared

IGSO-540
Supercharger driven by the engine, gearbox to drive propeller, and fuel injection (up to 380 hp (280 kW))

VO-540
Vertically mounted engine for use in a helicopter, normally aspirated and equipped with a carburetor

IVO-540
Normally aspirated engine with fuel injection, mounted vertically for use in a helicopter

TVO-540
Turbocharged engine equipped with a carburetor, mounted vertically for use in a helicopter

TIVO-540
Turbocharged engine with fuel injection, mounted vertically for use in a helicopter

HIO-540
Helicopter engine mounted horizontally as in fixed-wing aircraft, normally aspirated with fuel injection; not used in any fixed-wing aircraft

TIO-541
Same as a TIO-540, except the "1" indicates an integral accessory drive

TIGO-541
Same as a TIGO-540, except the "I" indicates an integral accessory drive

== Applications ==
=== Single engine ===
- Akaflieg München Mü30 Schlacro
- Bárcenas B-01
- Barrows Bearhawk
- Beechcraft Bonanza (by aftermarket STC)
- Bearhawk 5
- Bellanca Viking 300 (17-31 and 17-31TC)
- Bellanca 17-31ATC Turbo Viking
- Brantly 305
- CallAir A-9
- Celair Eagle 300
- Cerva CE.43 Guépard
- Cessna 182
- Cessna 206
- Dream Tundra
- Edgley Optica
- Embraer EMB 202 Ipanema
- Enaer T-35 Pillan
- Express Series 90
- Extra EA-260
- Extra EA-300
- Gippsland GA8
- Gippsland GA200
- Grob 120
- HAL HPT-32 Deepak
- Hiller UH-12
- IAR-823
- Lancair ES
- Lake Renegade
- Lasta 95
- Helio/Maule M5-235
- Mooney M20
- MSW Votec 252T
- Murphy Moose
- NAL NM-5
- Neiva Universal
- Northrop Grumman Firebird
- PAC CT/4E / CT/4F Airtrainer
- PAC Super Mushshak
- PAF XT-001 Marko 1
- Performance Aircraft Formula GT
- Piper Saratoga
- Piper PA-24 Comanche
- Piper PA-25 Pawnee
- Piper PA-28 Cherokee 235
- Piper PA-32 Cherokee Six
- Piper PA-46 Mirage
- Pipistrel Panthera
- Pitts Special
- PZL M26 Iskierka
- PZL-104MA Wilga 2000
- Raven 2XS
- Ravin 500
- Rihn DR-109
- Robinson R44
- Rockwell Commander 114
- Ruschmeyer R 90-230-FG
- Sharp Nemesis NXT
- SIAI-Marchetti SF.260
- SkyDancer SD-260
- Socata TB-20
- Socata TB-30 Epsilon
- Starfire Firebolt
- Stoddard-Hamilton Glasair III
- Swearingen SX-300
- Team Tango Foxtrot
- Team Rocket F1 Rocket
- Ultimate 10-300
- Utva 65
- Van's Aircraft RV-10
- Velocity XL
- Washington T-411 Wolverine
- Wilson Global Explorer
- Zlin Z-143
- Zlín Z 50

=== Multi engine ===
- AAC Angel
- Aero Commander 500 series
- AeroVolga LA-8L
- Bede BD-3
- Britten-Norman Islander
- Britten-Norman Trislander
- Dornier Do 28
- Evangel 4500
- Moynet 360-6 Jupiter
- Piaggio P.166
- Piper Aerostar
- Piper Aztec
- Piper PA-31 Navajo
- Tecnam P2012 Traveller

== Specifications (IO-540-K1A5) ==
Data from FAA Lycoming IO-540 Series Type Certificate. Retrieved: 1 September 2008.

=== General characteristics ===
- Type: Six-cylinder air-cooled horizontally opposed engine
- Bore: 5.125 in (130.2 mm)
- Stroke: 4.375 in (111.1 mm)
- Displacement: 541.5 in³ (8.9 L)
- Dry weight: 438 lb (199 kg)

=== Components ===
- Valvetrain: Two overhead valves per cylinder
- Fuel system: Fuel injection
- Fuel type: 100 octane rating gasoline
- Cooling system: Air-cooled

=== Performance ===
- Power output: 300 hp (220 kW) at 2,700 rpm at sea level
- Specific power: 0.55 hp/in³ (25.14 kW/L)
- Compression ratio: 8.7:1
- Power-to-weight ratio: 0.68 hp/lb (1.12 kW/kg)

== See also ==
Related development

- Lycoming IO-580

Comparable engines

- Continental O-520
- Continental IO-550

Related lists

- List of aircraft engines
