= Dornier Do 28 =

German twin-engine STOL utility aircraft

Do 28 Skyservant
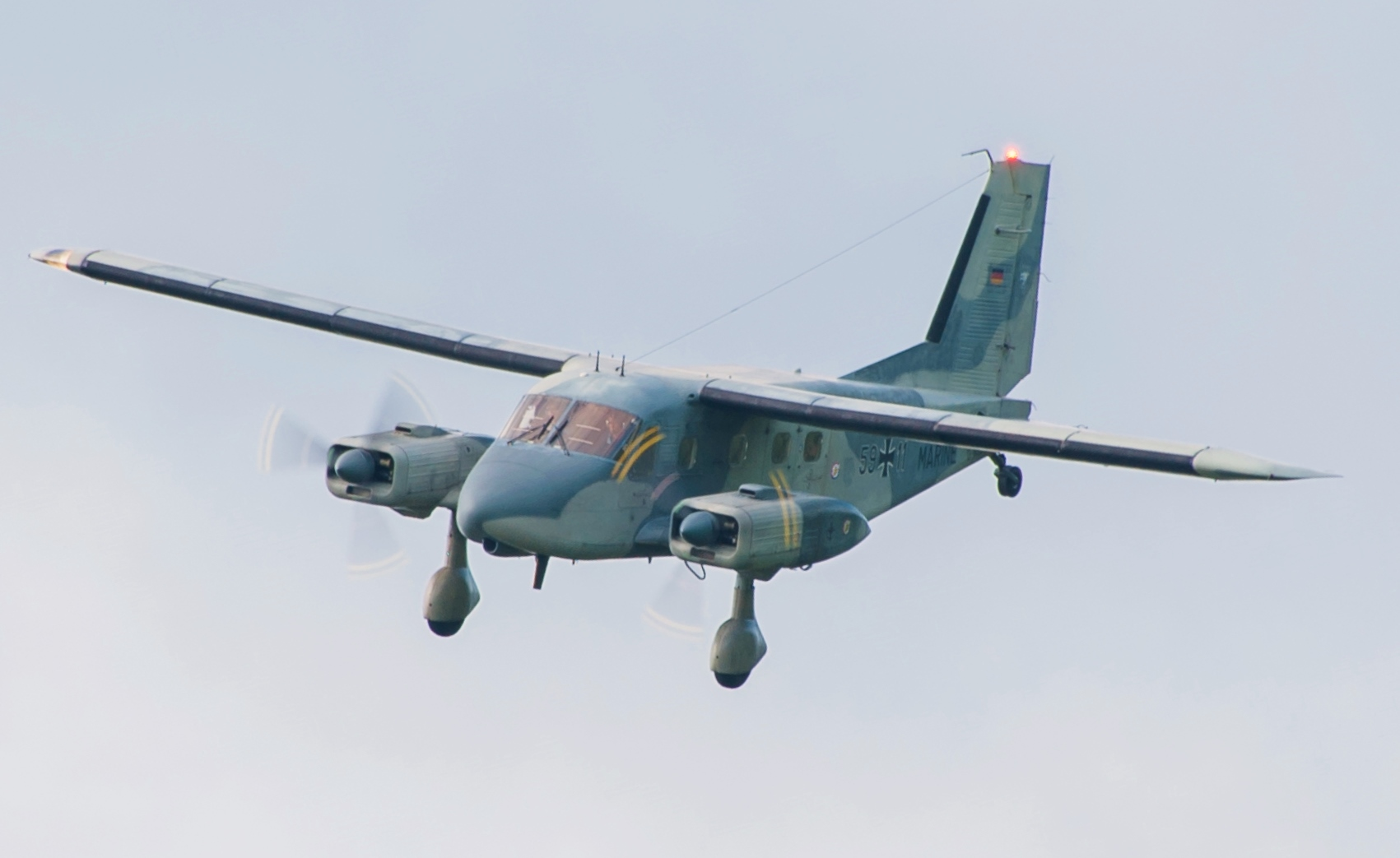
- Dornier Do-28D Skyservant

General information
- Type: STOL light utility aircraft
- Manufacturer: Dornier Flugzeugbau GmbH
- Status: In civilian and military use
- Primary user: German Air Force
- Number built: Do 28 - 1; Do 28A-1 - 60; Do 28B-1 - 60; Do 28D-1 - 54; Do 28D-2 - 172; Dornier 128-6 - 6

History
- First flight: 29 April 1959 (Do 28 A/B); 23 February 1966 (Do 28D)
- Developed from: Dornier Do 27
- Developed into: Dornier 228

Dornier Do 28 is a type designation that comprises two different twin-engine STOL utility aircraft, manufactured by German company Dornier Flugzeugbau GmbH. Most of them served with the German Air Force and Marineflieger and other air forces around the world in the communications and utility role. The Do 28 series consists of the fundamentally different Do 28 A/B (1959) and Do 28 D Skyservant (1966).

== Design and development ==
=== Dornier Do 28 A/B ===
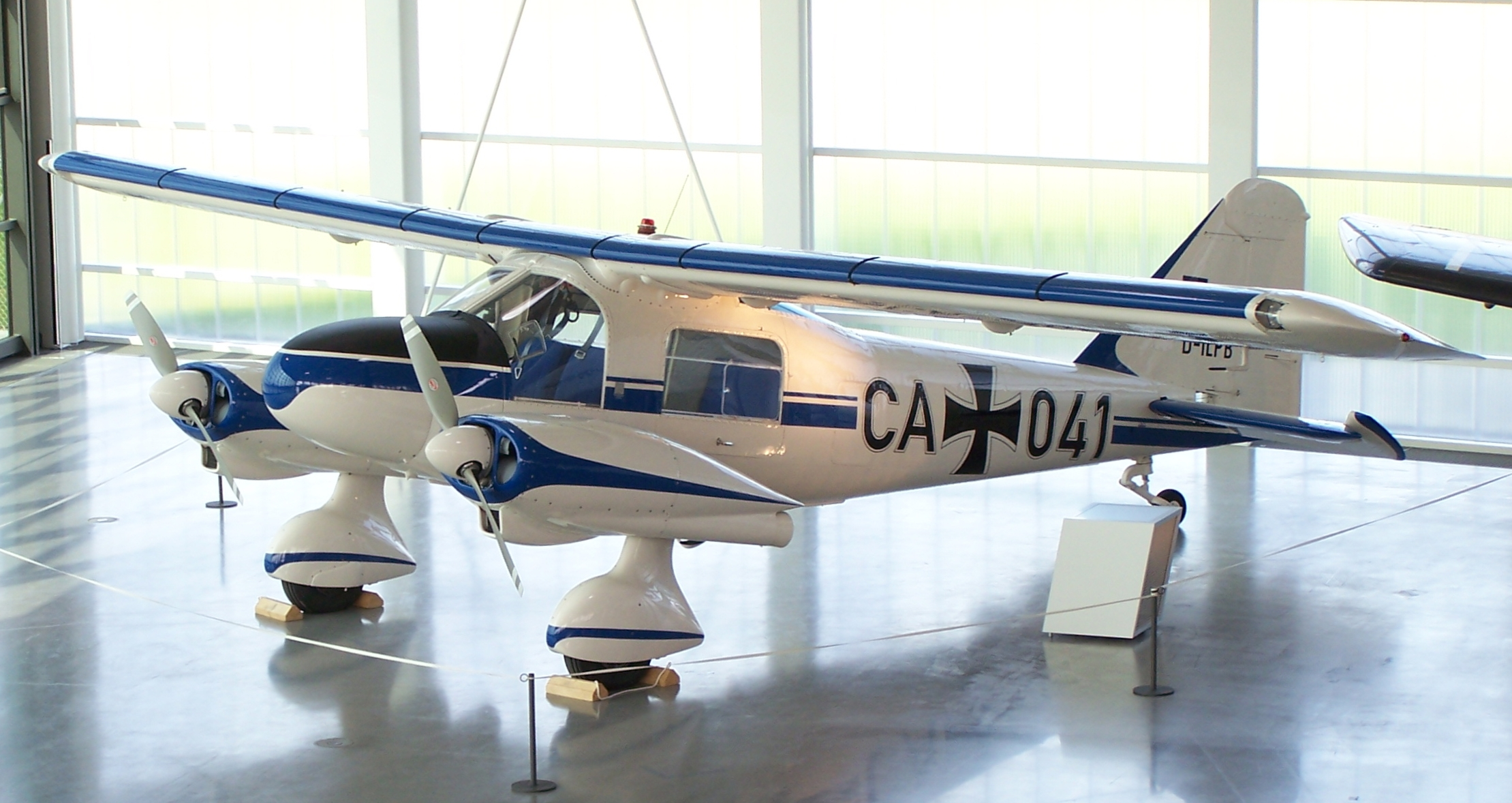
Dornier Do 28A-1

The Do 28 was developed from the single-engine Do 27 at the end of the 1950s. The design shared the high-wing cantilever layout and the lift augmentation devices of the Do 27, together with the rear fuselage which seated six passengers.

The defining feature of the new design was the unusual incorporation of two Lycoming engines, as well as the two main landing gear shock struts of the faired main landing gear attached to short pylons on either side of the forward fuselage. The internal space of the Do 28 was the same as the Do 27.

Like the Do 27, the Dornier Do 28 possessed a high cruising speed, excellent low-speed handling characteristics, as well as very short takeoff and landing (STOL) performance. The Do 28 was readily accepted as a natural progression from its single-engine forebear. With many of the same STOL characteristics, most Do 28 production was destined for military customers, notably Germany, although a small number were in service for commercial operators as a rugged, low-cost utility transport. The design proved remarkably adaptable and was developed into a number of progressively improved variants, from the original D, through the D1 and D2 to the 128-2, introduced in 1980. Each variant introduced a number of detail changes that enhanced its already versatile performance capabilities.

=== Dornier Do 28 D Skyservant ===
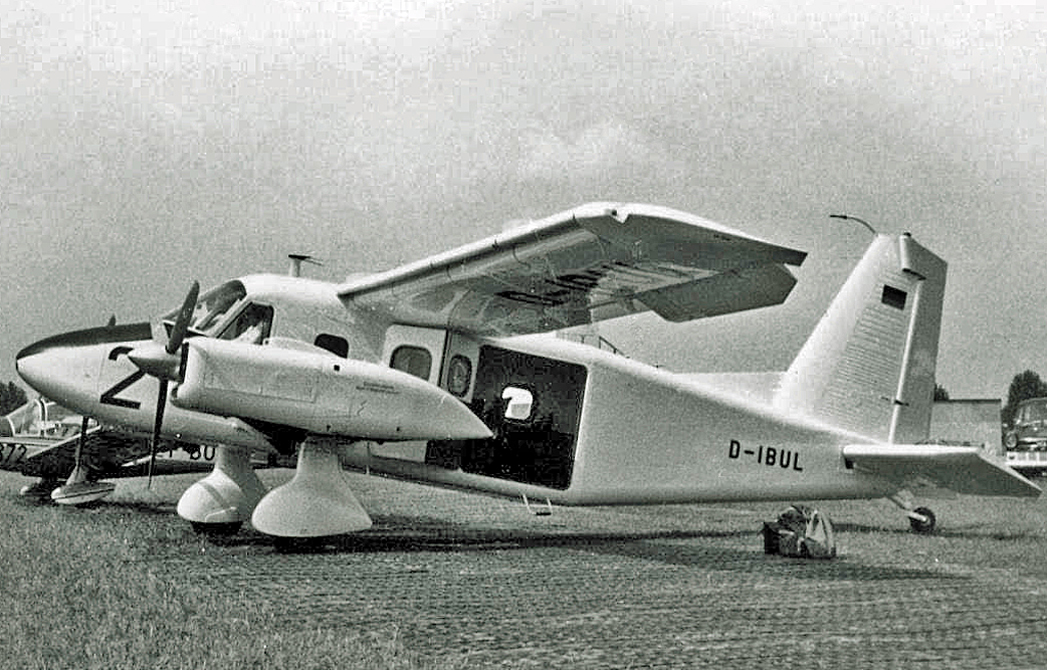
The second Dornier Do28D at the Paris Air Show in 1967

The Dornier company was given financial assistance from the German government to develop a larger STOL transport to carry up to 13 passengers. The type was designated the Do 28D and later named Skyservant. The Do 28D was a complete redesign and shared only the basic layout and wing construction of the earlier versions. The fuselage and engine nacelles were rectangular, unlike the rounded Do 28A/B. The aim was to develop a simple and rugged aircraft for use under arduous conditions, which could be easily maintained. With a crew of two pilots, the cabin accommodated up to 12 passengers; freight could be loaded easily through large double doors and with the seats removed the cabin gave 283 sq ft (26.3 m^{2}) of unobstructed space. The first flight of a Do 28D took place on 23 February 1966 and the type was publicly exhibited at the Paris Air Show at Le Bourget airport in June 1967.

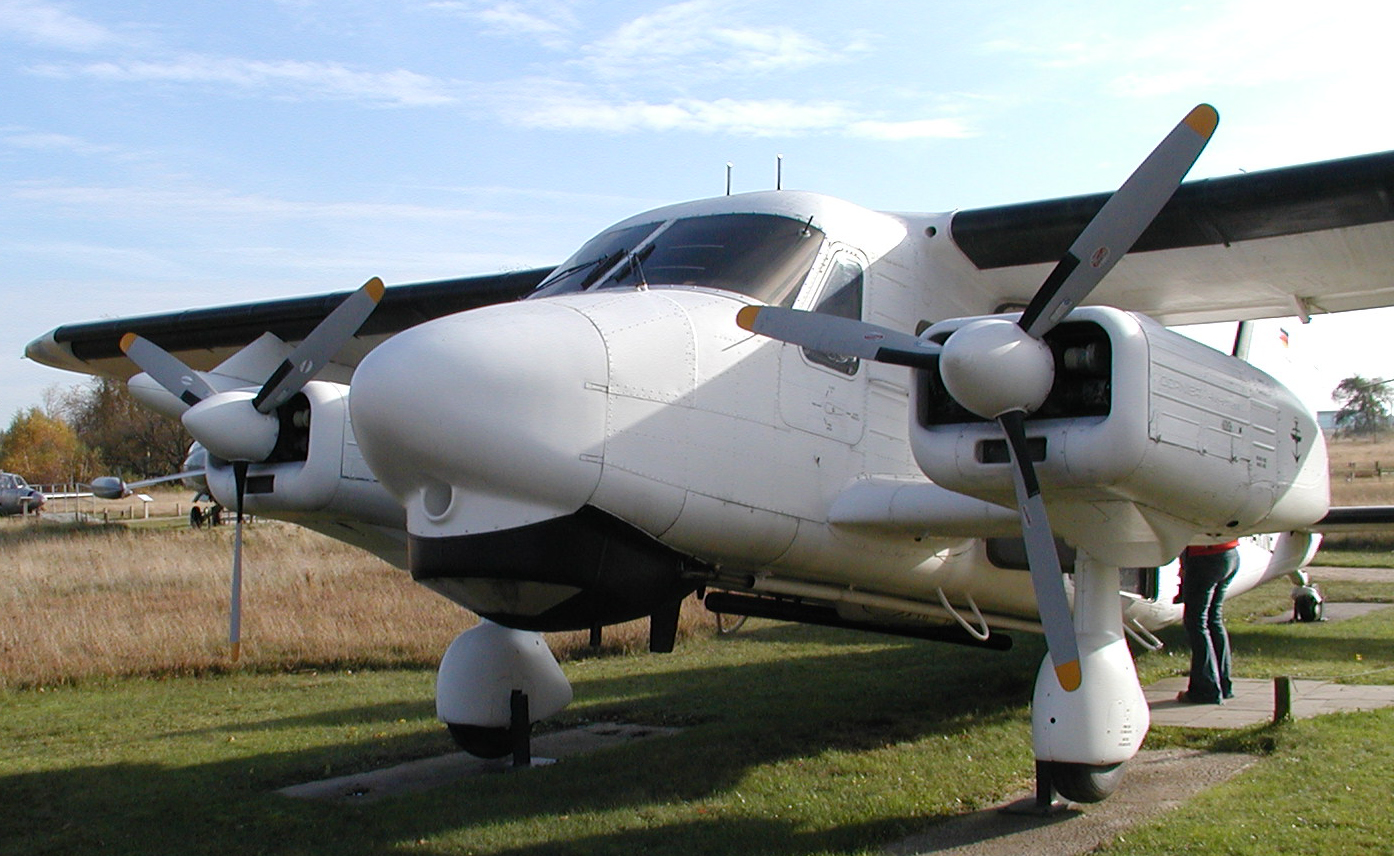
Dornier Do 28 D-2/OU pollution patrol aircraft

A further variant of the Skyservant was the Do 28D-2/OU (Oil Unit). Two aircraft were fitted with radar and SLAR (Side-Looking Airborne Radar) to monitor oil pollution in the Baltic and North Seas. Painted in a white scheme, they were operated between 1984 and 1995 by MFG 5 of the Marineflieger, on behalf of the German Transport Ministry. These aircraft are easily recognised by the fuselage-mounted SLAR antenna and a radome under the cockpit. In 1991, both aircraft operated for several weeks in the Persian Gulf during the Gulf War under the control of the United Nations. These two aircraft were replaced by the Dornier 228 at the end of 1995. These Skyservants are preserved in the Aeronauticum museum at Nordholz.

In 1997, the Hungarian engineer A. Gál developed a conversion based on a D-variant, that was intended to meet the requirements of skydivers. Instead of the Lycoming piston engines, Gál had two Walter M601-D2 and now its derivative General Electric H75 turboprop, modified three-blade AVIA propellers and a skydiving kit installed by Aerotech Slovakia on seven planes. Although CAA, Hungary's aviation authorities, instantly certified the conversion, the JAA-certification could not be applied for before 2007, due to certification restrictions on the engines. In 2008, there have been six planes flying in Europe, all of them Hungarian registered, mainly at dropzones in Soest, Germany, Target Skysports, Hibaldstow in the United Kingdom, Algarve (Portugal) and Seville (Spain).

== Operational history ==
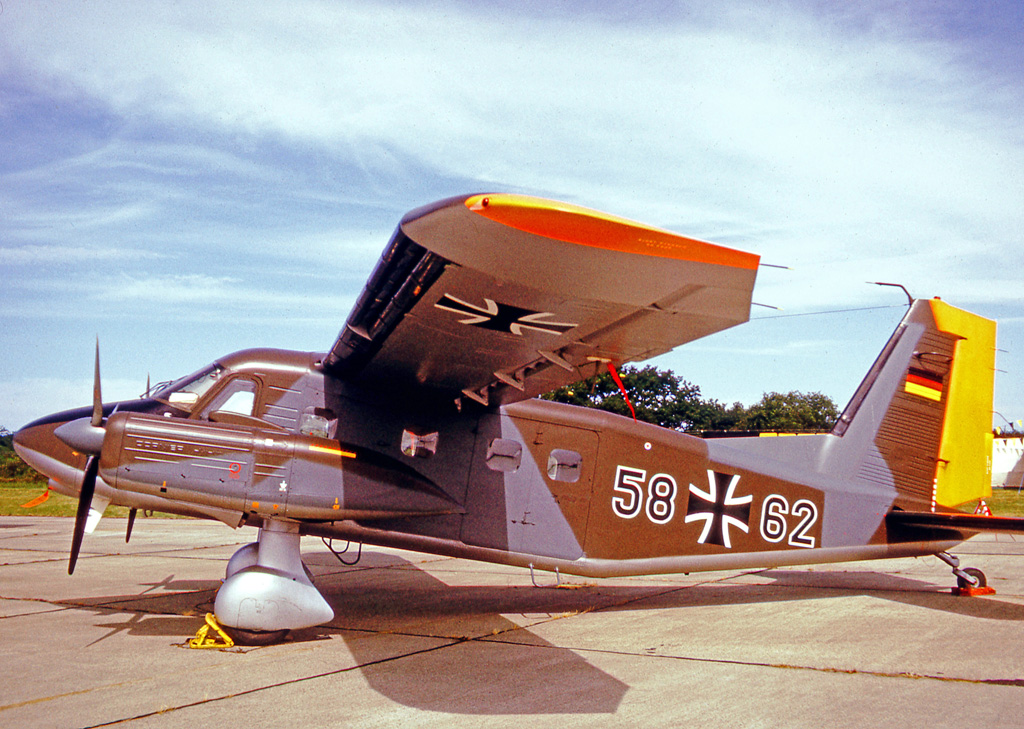
Do-28D-2 Skyservant of JBG36 German Air Force in 1973

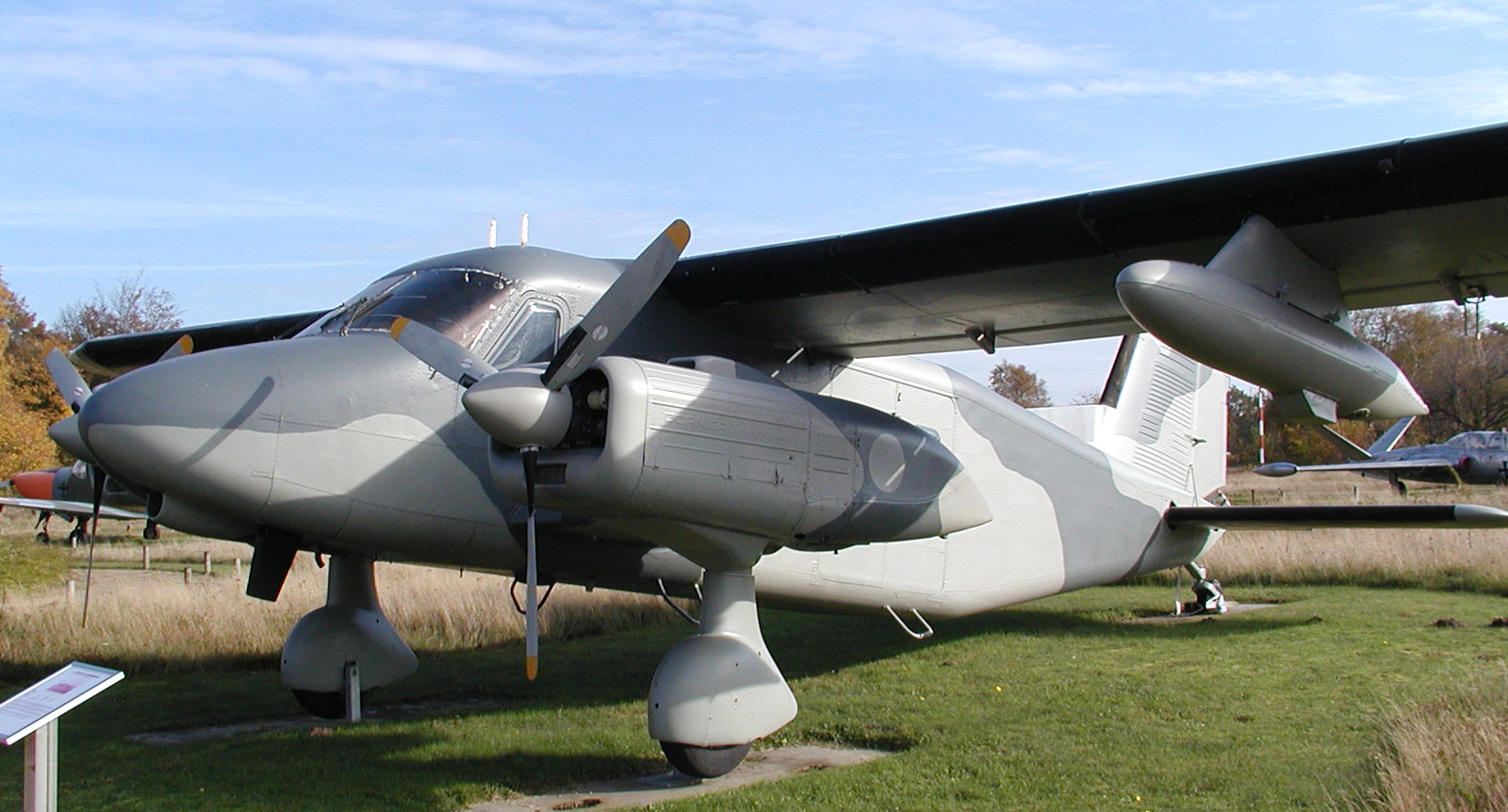
Dornier Do 28D-2 Skyservant

A total of 121 Dornier Do 28D-2s were built between 1971 and 1974 at Oberpfaffenhofen for the Bundeswehr (German Federal Armed Forces) where they replaced aging Percival Pembrokes. They served until the introduction of the Dornier 228 in 1994, predominantly as a transportation and communications aircraft. 20 aircraft were transferred to the Marineflieger, 10 served from 1978 in the maritime reconnaissance role, additional underwing fuel tanks were fitted for extended endurance (see photo).

The high noise levels and vibration in the cabin led to the type's replacement by the significantly quieter turboprop-powered Dornier 228. During the 20 years in German military service, only three aircraft were lost to accidents.

The Do 28D was flown in 30 countries around the world and is still in service today. More than 150 aircraft were built. In the German Federal Armed Forces jargon, the Skyservant was called the "farmer's eagle" and was regarded as a reliable "workhorse". Turkey received two specially equipped SIGINT aircraft with the code name of 'Anadolou' as well as the normal transport version.

== Variants ==
=== Dornier Do 28 A/B/C ===
Do 28
Prototype, first flew 29 April 1959 with two 180 hp (130 kW) Lycoming O-360-A1A engines and fixed pitch two-blade propellers; one built.
Do 28A-1
Designation of production aircraft with 250 hp (190 kW) Lycoming O-540-A1A engines and a 7 ft increase in wingspan, 60 built. First flown on 20 March 1960 at Oberpfaffenhofen. One aircraft was used for the personal transport of the German Defense Minister, Franz Josef Strauss; 60 built.
Do 28A-1-S
Floatplane conversion of the Do 28A-1 by the Jobmaster Company of Seattle, Washington, United States.
Do 28B-1
Do 28A with enlarged nose, additional fuel tanks, increased tailplane area and powered by 290 hp (220 kW) Lycoming IO-540 fuel injected engines and three-blade constant speed propellers, 60 built.
Do 28B-1-S
Proposed floatplane conversion of the Do 28B-1 by the Jobmaster Company of Seattle, Washington, USA.
Do 28B-2
Variant with turbocharged Lycoming TIO-540 engines, one built.
Do 28C
Designation of a proposed eight-seat version with two 530 shp turboprops but this design was not pursued.

=== Dornier Do 28 D Skyservant and derivatives ===
Do 28D
Redesigned aircraft with box fuselage, larger wing, new tail and two 380 hp (280 kW) IGSO-540 engines, seven built.
Do 28D-1
Production version of the Do 28D, with 0.5 m (1 ft 7½ in) greater wingspan and higher gross weight. 54 built.

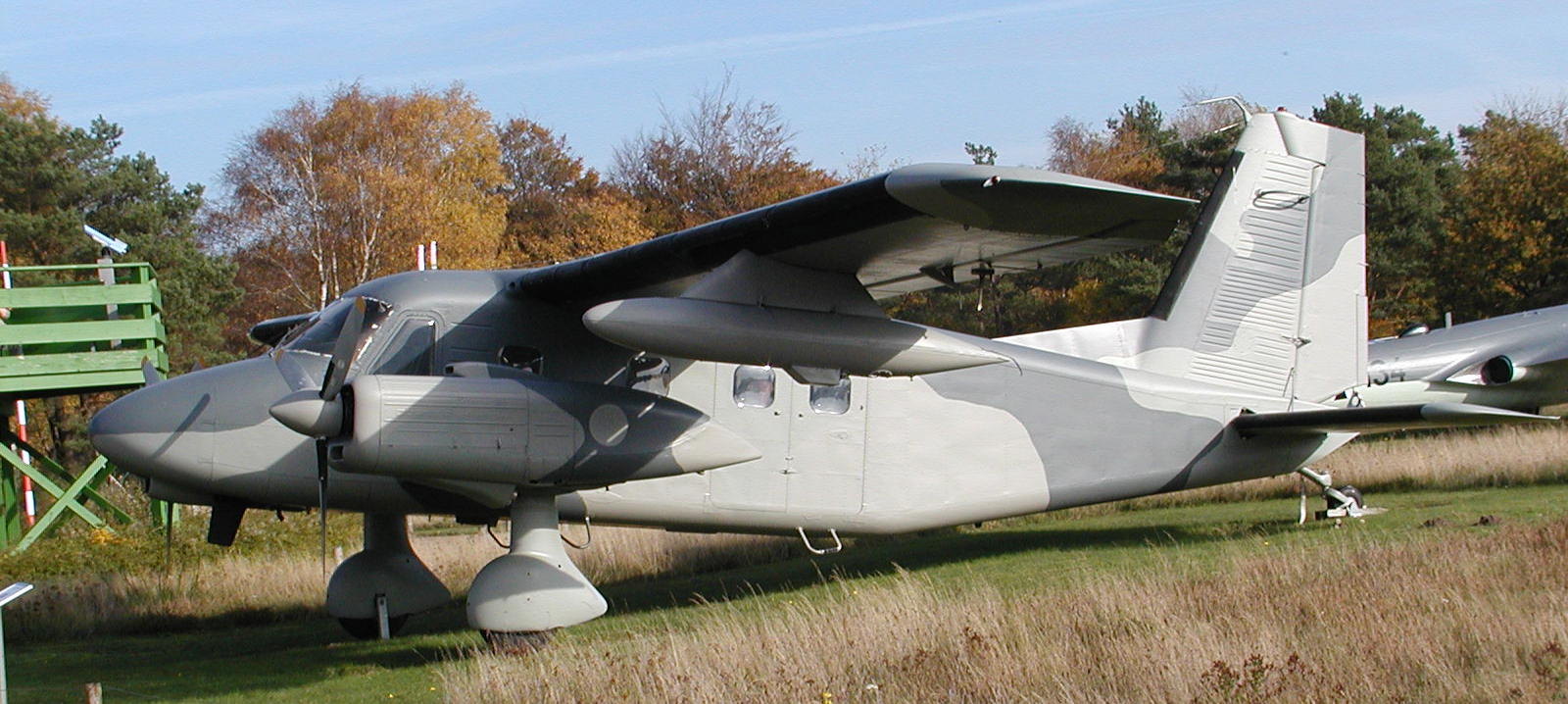
Dornier Do 28 D-2

Do 28D-2
Increased maximum takeoff weight, strengthened fuselage with enlarged cabin, 172 built.
Do 28D-2/OU
Do 28D modified as a pollution patrol aircraft
Do 28D-2T
In 1980 one German Air Force Do 28D-2 aircraft was fitted with two Avco Lycoming TIGO-540 turbocharged engines.
Do 28D-5X Turbo Skyservant
Prototype version powered by Lycoming LTP-101-600 turboprops rated at 298 kW (400 shp) each. One built, first flying on 9 April 1978. Also known as the TurboSky.
Do 28D-6X Turbo Skyservant
Prototype version powered by PT6A-110 turboprops, also rated at 298 kW (400 shp) each. One built, first flying on 4 March 1980 later redesignated Dornier 128-6.

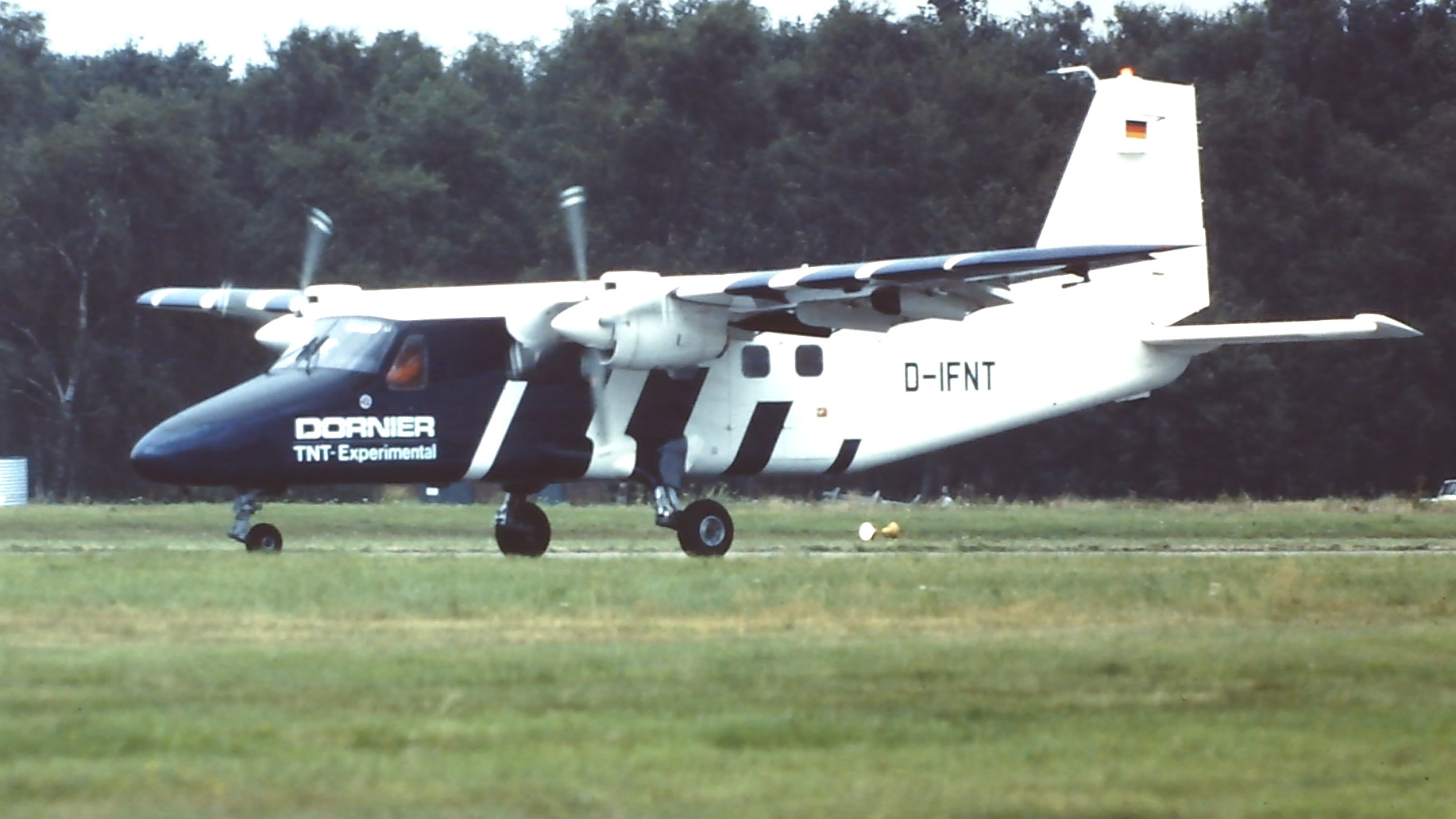
Do 28 TNT Experimental aircraft in 1980

Do 28E-TNT
A Do 28D fitted with a new, high technology wing (Tragflügel Neuer Technologie – New Technology Wing) of 19.97 m (55 ft 8 in) span for trials, powered by two 533 kW (715 shp) Garrett TPE331-5-252D mounted on the wing. One built, first flown on 14 June 1979. Wing later used in the Dornier 228.
Do 28 G.92
1995 conversion of Do 28D powered by two Walter M601-D2 750 hp turboprops used for skydiving operations, seven built. Several now reengined with General Electric H75 to allow 750hp at higher altitudes than the Walter M601
Dornier 128-2
Improved version of Do 28D-2, replaced D-2 in 1980.
Dornier 128-6
Production version of the Turbo Skyservant, six built.

== Operators ==
=== Military operators ===
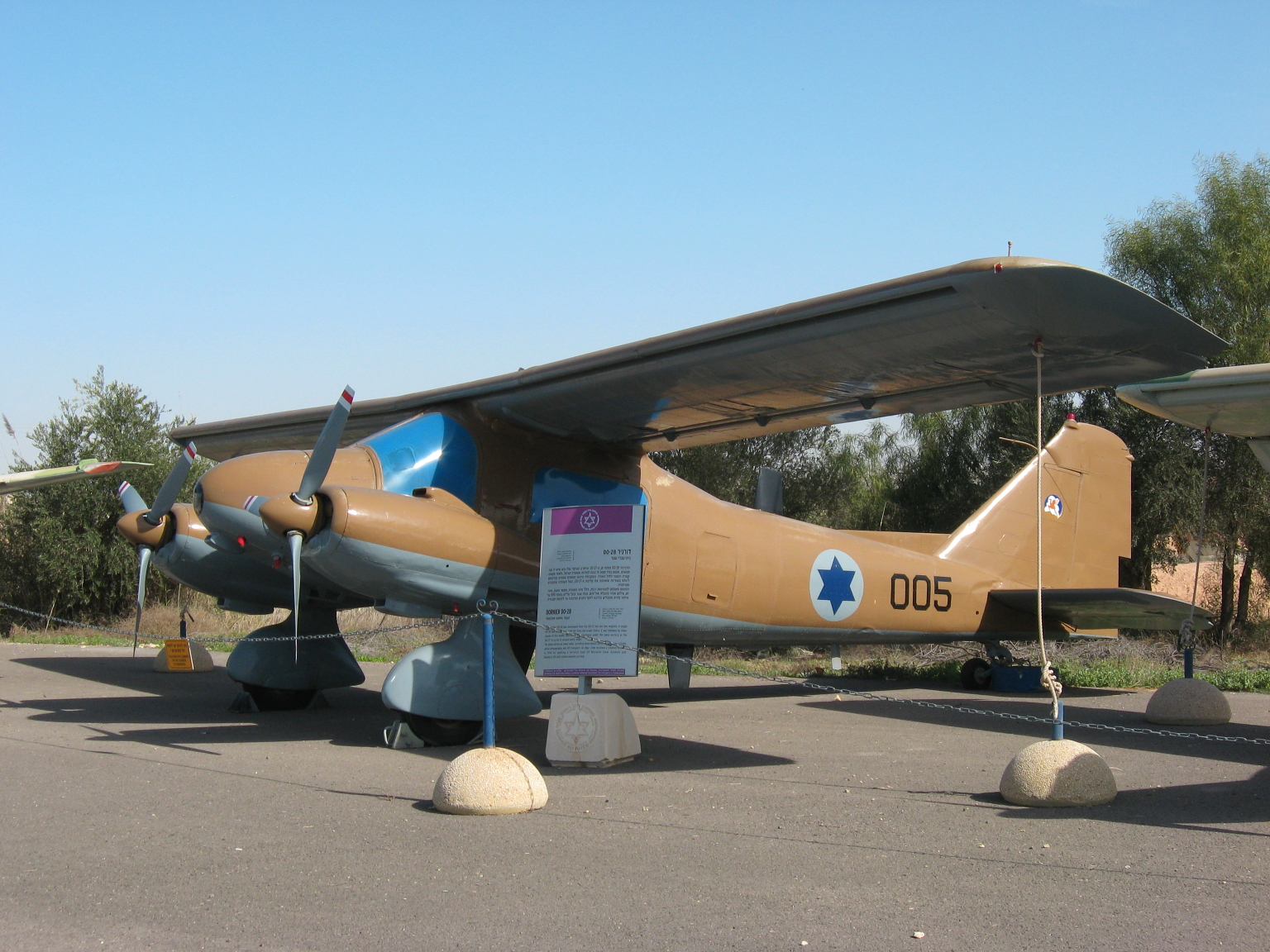
Dornier Do-28 at the Israeli Air Force Museum in Hatzerim.

Angola

- Angolan Air Force

Benin

- Benin Air Force; retired as of 2026

Cambodia

- Royal Cambodian Air Force – Former operator

Cameroon

- Cameroon Air Force

Croatia

- Croatian Air Force – Former operator.

Germany

- German Air Force
- German Army – Former operator.
- German Navy

Greece

- Hellenic Air Force

Israel

- Israeli Air Force

Katanga

- Force Aérienne Katangaise

Kenya

- Kenya Air Force

Khmer Republic

- Khmer Air Force

Lesotho

- Police Mobile Air Unit

Malawi

- Malawi Army Air Wing

Morocco

- Royal Moroccan Air Force

Mozambique

- Military of Mozambique 3 Dornier 28 in service

Niger

- Nigerien Air Force

Nigeria

- Nigerian Air Force – 11 Dornier 128 as of December 2012

Spain

- Spanish Air Force – 1 plane used by the Spanish Governor of Equatorial Guinea. After the independence, it was transferred to the Test Flight Centre in Torrejon AB. No longer in service.

Serbia

- Serbian Air Force – Former operator

Tanzania

- Tanzania Air Force Command

Turkey

- Turkish Army Aviation

Yugoslavia

- Yugoslav Air Force – Former operator

Zambia

- Zambian Air Force

=== Civil operators ===
Colombia
Ethiopia

- Ethiopian National Police - Former operator.

France

- Directorate-General of Customs and Indirect Taxes

Netherlands

- Winair

Philippines

- Interisland Airlines

Somalia

- Somali Police Force

Thailand

- Royal Thai Police

== Specifications (Do 28D-2 Skyservant) ==
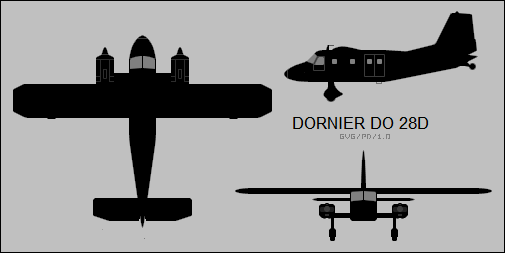
Dornier Do 28D

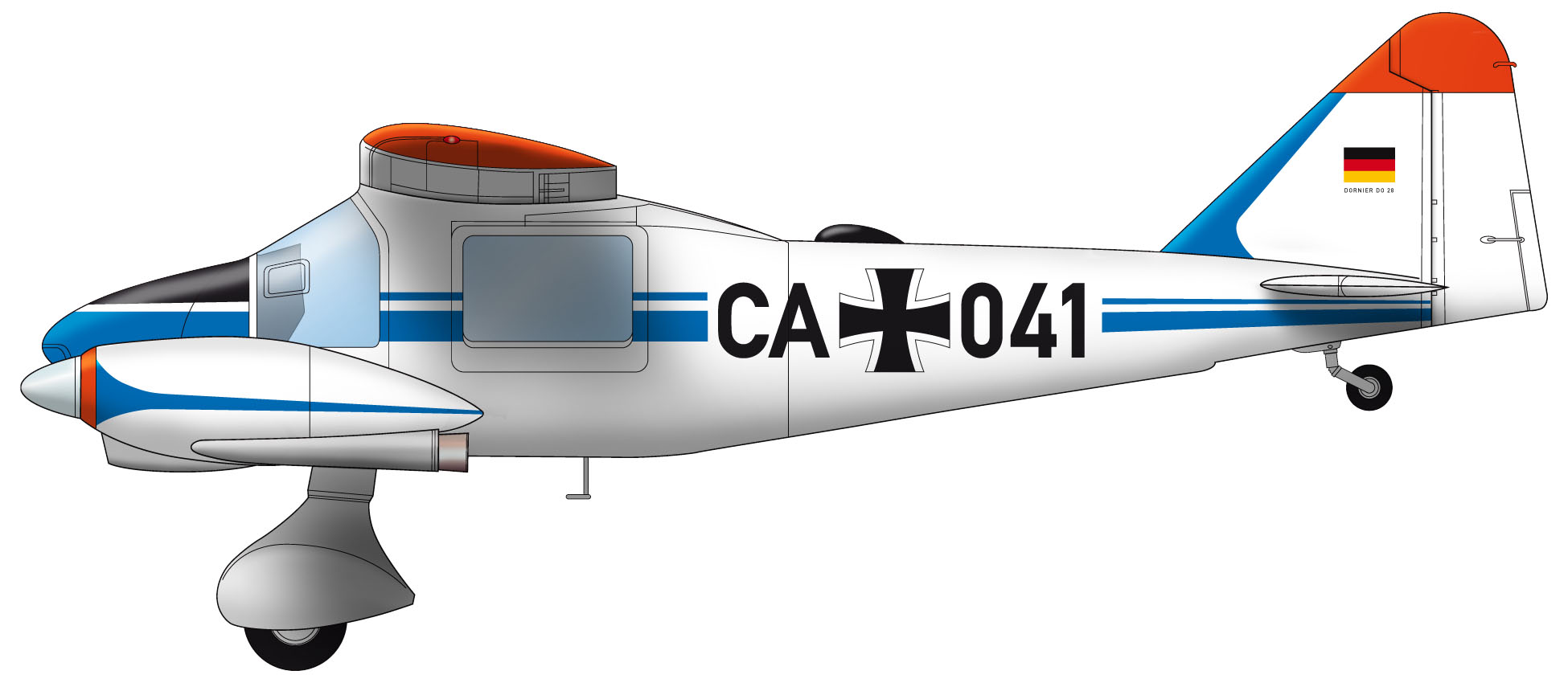
side view

Data from Jane's All the World's Aircraft 1976–77

General characteristics

- Crew: 1 or 2
- Capacity: 12 or 13 passengers
- Length: 11.41 m (37 ft 5 in)
- Wingspan: 15.55 m (51 ft 0 in)
- Height: 3.90 m (12 ft 10 in)
- Wing area: 29.00 m^{2} (312.2 sq ft)
- Aspect ratio: 8.3:1
- Airfoil: NACA 23018 (modified)
- Empty weight: 2,304 kg (5,079 lb)
- Max takeoff weight: 4,015 kg (8,852 lb)
- Fuel capacity: 893 L (236 US gal; 196 imp gal)
- Powerplant: 2 × Lycoming IGSO-540-A1E air-cooled flat-six engines, 280 kW (380 hp) each
- Propellers: 3-bladed Hartzell constant-speed propellers

Performance

- Maximum speed: 325 km/h (202 mph, 175 kn) at 3,000 m (10,000 ft)
- Cruise speed: 241 km/h (150 mph, 130 kn) at 10,000 ft (3,000 m) (econ cruise, 50% power)
- Stall speed: 104 km/h (65 mph, 56 kn) (power off, flaps down)
- Minimum control speed: 65 km/h (40 mph, 35 kn) (power on, flaps down)
- Range: 2,950 km (1,830 mi, 1,590 nmi) (with max fuel)
- Service ceiling: 7,680 m (25,200 ft)
- Rate of climb: 5.3 m/s (1,050 ft/min)

== See also ==
Related development

- Dornier Do 27 (predecessor)
- Dornier 228 (successor)

Aircraft of comparable role, configuration, and era

- Britten-Norman BN-2 Islander
- Scottish Aviation Twin Pioneer
- Antonov An-14
