= General Electric H-Series =

Turboprop aircraft engine

H-Series
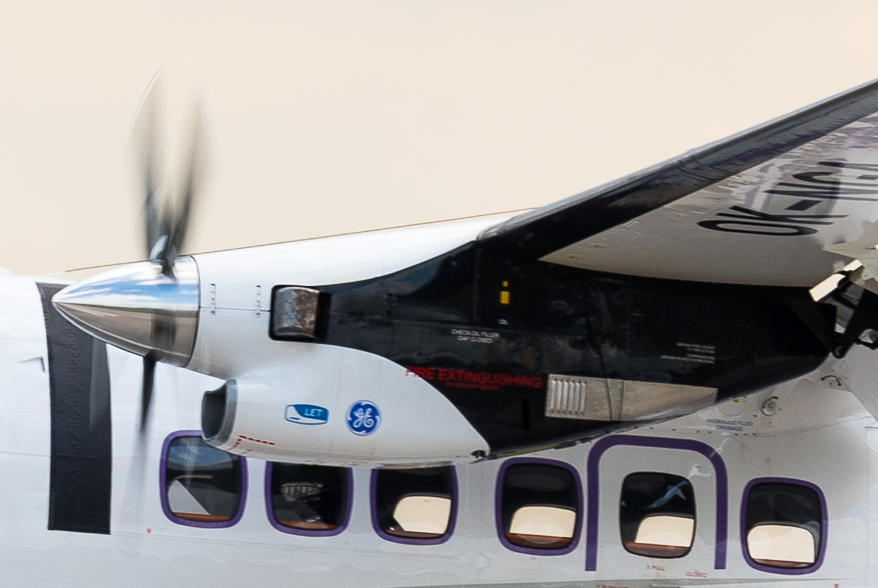
- Let L-410NG H85 installation
- Type: Turboprop
- National origin: Czech Republic/United States
- Manufacturer: GE Aviation Czech
- First run: 2009
- Major applications: Thrush Model 510; Let L-410NG; Technoavia Rysachok
- Developed from: Walter M601

The General Electric H-Series is a family of turboprop aircraft engines produced by GE Aviation Czech,. The initial H80 is an updated derivative of the Walter M601, while the H75 and H85 are later derivatives.

== Development ==
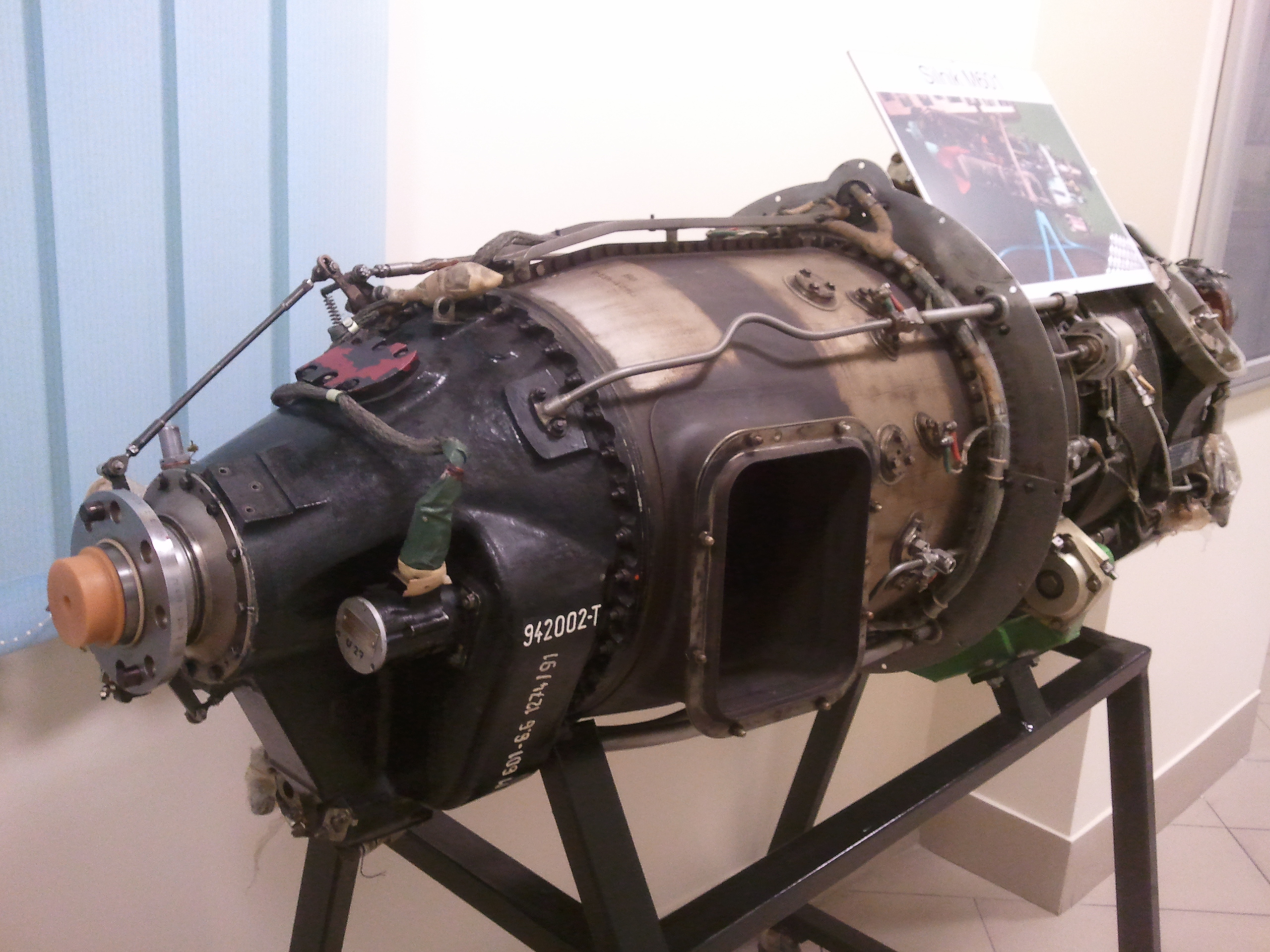
The H80 is based on the Walter M601

The H80 was launched in 2009 based on the M601. GE added a new compressor, blisks, blades and new stators to enhance power by 3% and boost efficiency by 10%. It reaches 597 kW (801 hp) (shaft horsepower) from the M601-F's 580 kW (780 hp), and improves hot and high performance.

The H80 was certificated by EASA at 13 December 2011, followed by the FAA at 13 March 2012. Its Russian type certificate was received in October 2012, and the engine also approved by Brazilian Civil Aviation agency (ANAC) and the Argentine Administración Nacional de Aviación Civil.

Its Electronic Engine and Propeller Control (EEPC) system received EASA type certification in late 2016. The Diamond Dart 550 military trainer is due to fly it in early 2018 and it will be certified on the Thrush 510G crop duster in this year.

== Design ==
The two-shaft, reverse flow design is derived from the Walter M601: its core features a two-stage axial and single-stage centrifugal compressor, an annular combustor and a single turbine stage, and its propulsion section is powered by a single-stage turbine driving a two-stage planetary gearbox. GE redesigned the compressor with 3D aero to improve its pressure ratio and upgraded the hot section and turbine stages with modern metal alloys for higher temperatures with the same durability.

The H75-100 weighs 94 lb (43 kg) more than the equivalent PT6 but pioneers single lever electronic propeller and engine control in general aviation, for an initial TBO of 4,000 hr which could be increased with experience. It promises 10% better fuel burn, 10% longer overhaul and lower maintenance costs than the PT6A-135 for the Nextant G90XT.

== Variants ==
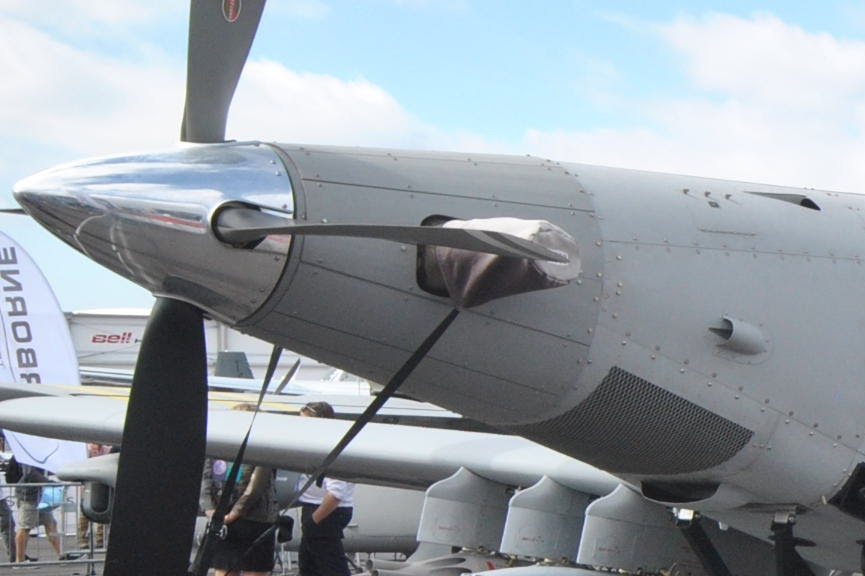
H80 installation in a Thrush 510G

H80
formerly the M601H-80
H75
750 shp or 550 shp derivatives
H75-A
550 shp derivative with aerobatic modifications
H85
850 shp derivative

== Applications ==
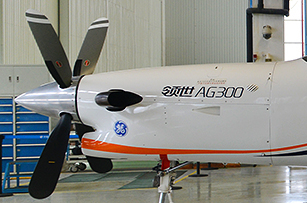
CAIGA Primus 150 H85 installation

- CAIGA Primus 150 (H85)
- Diamond Dart 550 (H75-100)
- Dornier Do-28 G92 (H75-200)
- Let L-410 Turbolet UVP-E20 (H80-200) and L-410NG (H85)
- Nextant G90XT (H75-100)
- Technoavia Rysachok (H80)
- Thrush Model 510 (H80)

== Specification (H80) ==
GE H Series Turboprop Engine
Variant	H75	H80	H85
Dimensions (L×W×H)	1,670×560×580 mm (66×22×23 in)		
basic dry	390 lb (180 kg)		
Compressor	2-stage axial + 1-stage centrifugal		
Combustor	Annular with fuel slinger		
turbine	1-stage axial gas.gen + 1-stage axial power		
fuel type	Jet-A/A1		
Shaft power	751 hp (560 kW)	800 hp (597 kW)	850 hp (634 kW)
Eq. shaft power	795 hp (593 kW)	845 hp (630 kW)	898 hp (670 kW)
Power-to-weight ratio	1.93	2.05	2.18
gas gen. RPM	35,524	35,854	36,183
Shaft RPM	2,080		
airflow	8.1 lb (3.7 kg)/s	8.2 lb (3.7 kg)	8.4 lb (3.8 kg)
TBO	4,000 h		
Overall pressure ratio		6.7:1	

== See also ==
Related development

- Walter M601

Comparable engines

- Pratt & Whitney Canada PT6
- General Electric Catalyst
- Klimov VK-800

Related lists

- List of aircraft engines
