= Let L-410 Turbolet =

Twin-engine short-range transport aircraft

L-410 Turbolet
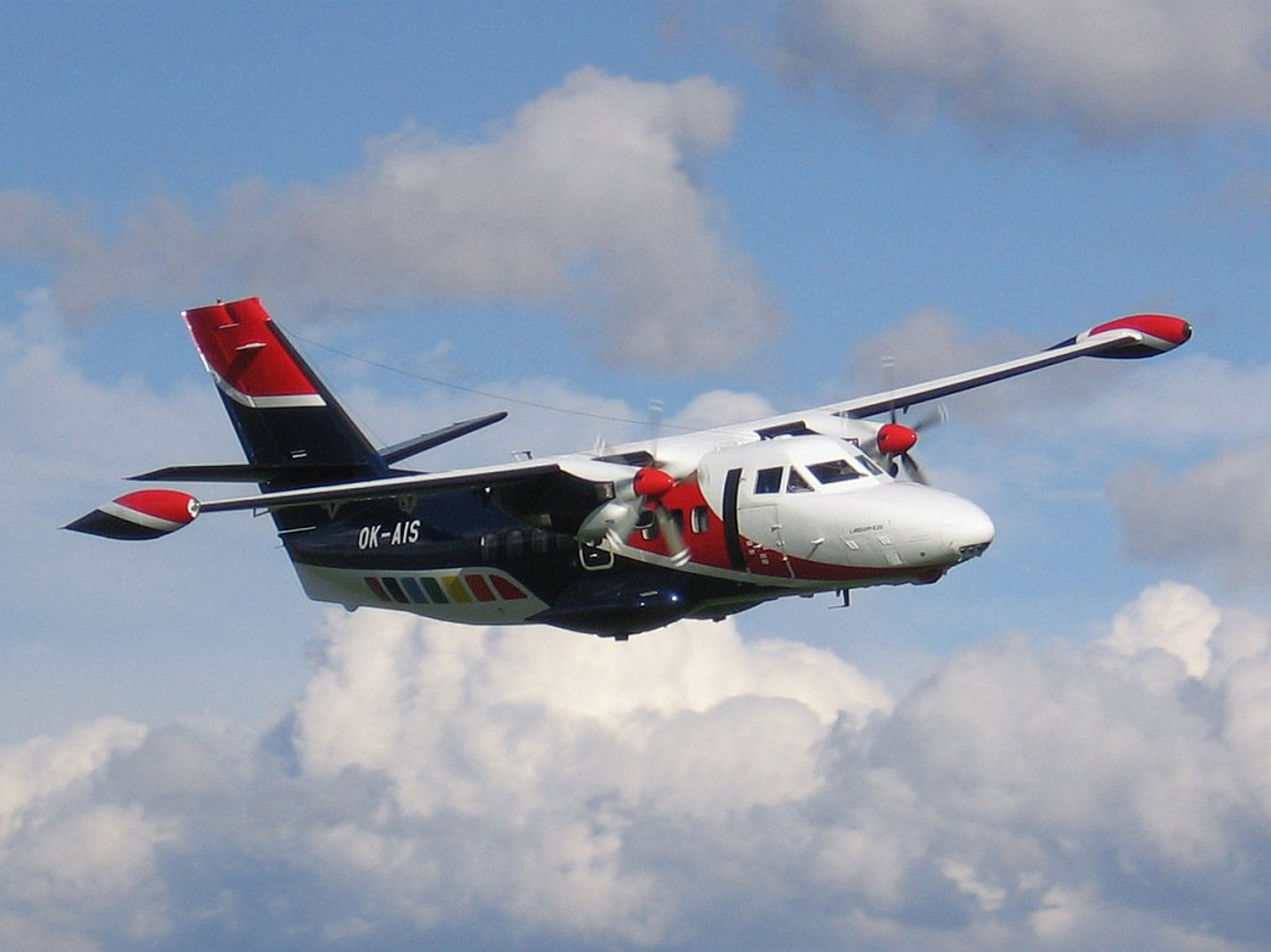

General information
- Type: Regional airliner, cargo aircraft
- Manufacturer: Let Kunovice
- Status: In service
- Primary users: Russian Air Force Slovak Air Force; Searca; Aeroflot (historical)
- Number built: 1,200

History
- Manufactured: 1971–present
- Introduction date: 1970
- First flight: 16 April 1969
- Variant: Aircraft Industries L 410 NG
- Developed into: Let L-610

The Let L-410 Turbolet is a twin-engine short-range turboprop transport aircraft designed and produced by the Czech aircraft manufacturer Let Kunovice (named Aircraft Industries since 2005).

It was developed as the L-400 during the 1960s in response to an Aeroflot requirement for an Antonov An-2 replacement and performed its maiden flight on 16 April 1969. Since 1970, the L‑410 has been in operation with a variety of customers, having been typically used as an airliner and a utility transport aircraft, numerous military air services have also adopted the type. The aircraft is capable of landing on short and unpaved runways and operating under extreme conditions from −50 to +50 °C (−58 to 122 °F).

Various models of the L-410 have been produced over the type’s production run of over fifty years; while initial aircraft were powered by imported Pratt & Whitney Canada PT6-27 engines, most models have been powered by domestically built Walter M601. Both the size and capabilities of the aircraft differ across the family; during the 1990s, the company pivoted towards the Western market and pursued type certification by the Federal Aviation Administration (FAA) and European Union Aviation Safety Agency (EASA) of its later models. Perhaps the most substantial variant to date is the L 410 NG, which has double the range of the original model, as well as other improvements such as a glass cockpit. By 2016, in excess of 1,200 L-410s had been constructed while in excess of 350 aircraft were reportedly in service with operators across more than 50 countries.

== Development ==
Development of the L-410 was started during the mid-1960s by the Czechoslovak aircraft manufacturer Let Kunovice. The company had decided to launch the project with awareness that the Soviet airline Aeroflot was actively seeking a turboprop-powered replacement for the Antonov An-2 biplane, which was viewed as a potentially lucrative opportunity for a suitable aircraft. Preliminary studies performed by Let centred around a design referred to as the L-400. In addition to its use as an airliner, equal attention was paid towards its suitability for the role of a cargo aircraft.

Following considerable revision of the original concept, a new version was produced, which the company called the L-410 Turbolet. On 16 April 1969, the first prototype, designated XL-410, performed its maiden flight, piloted by Vladimir Vik and Frantisek Svinka. The prototype was not only used for test flights but also to promote the aircraft to potential customers, appearing at various air shows, including the 1969 Paris Air Show. As a consequence of the delayed development of a suitable Czech engine, the Walter M601, both the prototype and the initial production model were powered by Pratt & Whitney Canada PT6-27 engines and Hartzell HC-B-3TN-3D three-blade propellers, both of which were imported from North America.

Once development of the M601 engine had been completed, it was quickly adopted and coupled with Avia-built V 508 three-blade propellers to replace the PT6 engine on the second production model, designated L-410M. A further version, the L-410 UVP, was specifically developed for Aeroflot, who had expressed dissatisfaction in the performance of the initial model. In comparison with earlier models, the revised aircraft provided improved performance in take-off and landing, which are largely due to its increased wing and tail area, making it a Short take-off/landing (STOL) aircraft. As a consequence of its increased empty weight and a shift in the center of gravity, the L-410 UVP has a decreased seating capacity of 15 passengers.

The most common variant of the type, the L-410 UVP-E, possesses an increased maximum take-off weight of 6,400 kg (14,100 lb), is equipped with more powerful M601E engines that drive new five-blade propellers designated V 510, and is provisioned for equipping wing tip tanks that increase the aircraft's overall fuel capacity. The L-410 UVP-E performed its first flight in 1984 while quantity production of the model commenced during 1986. By 1990, in excess of 1,000 L-410s had been constructed.

The L-410 UVP-E9 and L-410 UVP-E20 are versions which vary from each other only minorly, these were produced to satisfy the differing regulations of various certifying authorities of different regions. Later production L-420s have been outfitted with a newer Walter engine variant, the M601F. Production of the L-410 UVP-E20 was underway in the early twenty-first century, being powered by the latest derivative of the M601 engine, designated GE H80-200, and outfitted new Avia Propeller AV-725 five blade propellers.

Following the end of the Cold War, company officials opted to pursue opportunities for the aircraft in Western markets. On 11 March 1998, the L‑410 first received approval for its use in North America by the Federal Aviation Administration (FAA); the improved L-410 UVP-E20 was similarly certified on 30 June 2015. On 4 February 2005, this same model of the L-410 had been certified by the European Union Aviation Safety Agency (EASA) while all other production variants followed on 28 March 2007. In the mid-2010s, a typical production rate of 15 L-410 UVPs were being completed each year.

On 3 September 2013, the Russian company UGMK (Iskander Machmudov) became the majority owner of LET Kunovice Aircraft Industries. At the time of the acquisition, it was announced that a new production line for the L-410 would be established within Russia within one year. As part of this strategy, the company developed the most substantial variant of the aircraft to date, the L 410 NG, which can be visually distinguished from its predecessors by its considerably longer nose as well its enlarged rear area, the latter change being made to accommodate the carriage of double the luggage. It is also furnished a new wing design and has been fitted with a modernised Garmin G3000 glass cockpit. The propulsion system has also been redesigned, featuring more powerful and quieter GE H85 engines that drive Avia-725 propellers. The L 410 NG can fly for double the range of the original model of the aircraft.

On 7 July 2015, the company displayed the first L 410 NG, which had been manufactured in Russia; it performed its first flight on 29 July 2015. Power grew up to 850 shp (630 kW) instead of the previous 800 shp (600 kW) GE H80-200, speed increased to 223 kn (413 km/h). Maximum take-off weight rose 500 kg (1,100 lb) to 7,000 kg (15,000 lb) and range to 1,350 nmi (2,500 km) up from the original 820 nmi (1,520 km). Fuel capacity rose from 1,300 to 2,450 kg (2,870 to 5,400 lb) and endurance from five hours to nine hours. FAA, EASA and Russian certification took place in late 2017. Serial production of the L 410 NG commenced in March 2018.

Due to the Russian invasion of Ukraine, which led to sanctions against the Russian Federation by the European Union and other Western countries, Aircraft Industries lost its main customer for its passenger aircraft – Russia. Due to the subsequent financial difficulties, the Kunovice based aircraft factory was acquired by the OMNIPOL Group in 2022.

== Design ==
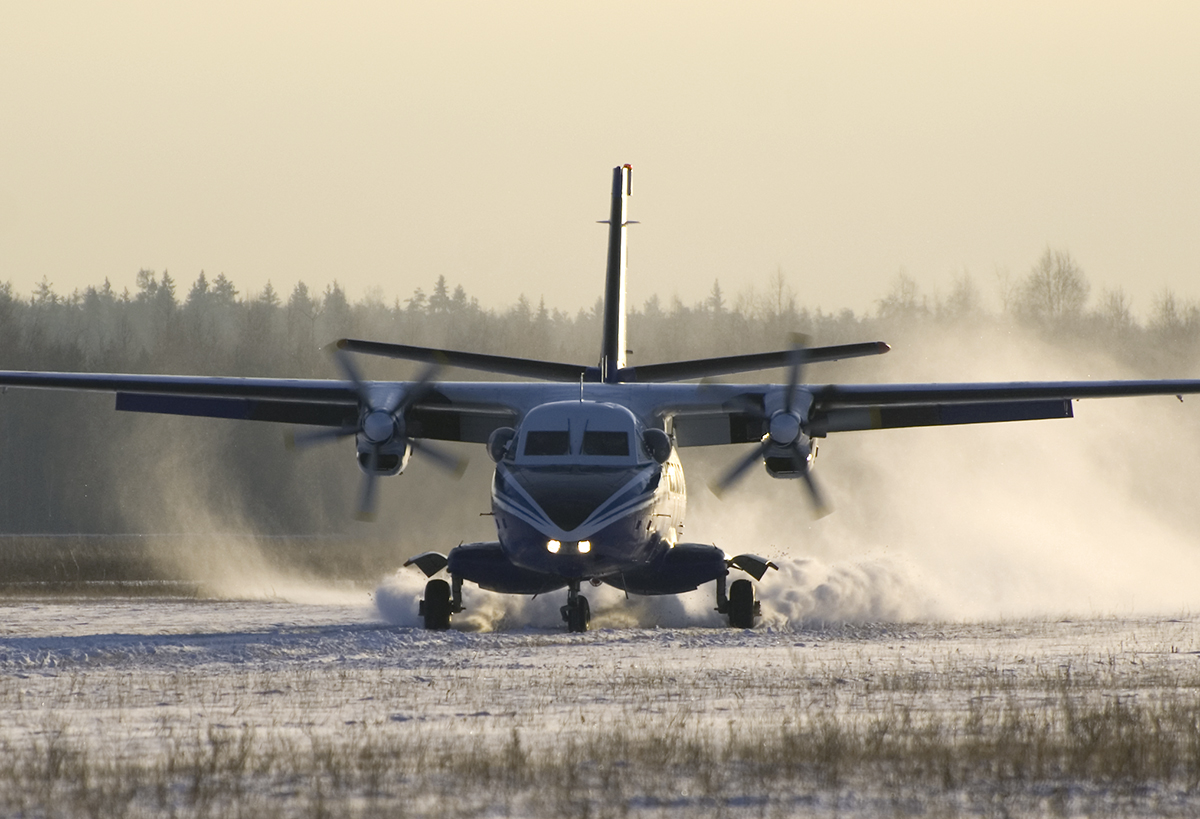
Head-on view of a L-410 landing upon snow

The Let L-410 Turbolet is an unpressurized all-metal high-wing commuter aircraft. It is characterised by its relatively low maintenance and operating costs, as well as its adaptable design, which includes special interchangeable configurations. All models are equipped with a retractable undercarriage. The L‑410 UVP-E features two hydraulic circuits, one being the primary and the other intended for emergencies; the main electrical system operates with 28V DC. The de-icing system is leading edge pneumatic deicers and electrical heating of propellers, cockpit windshields and pitot-static system heads. The maximum take-off weight of the L-410 UVP-E is 6400 kg with the possibility of an increase to 6,600 kg (14,600 lb) for the E9 and E20 variants, possessing a maximum seating capacity of between 17 and 19 passengers. The L‑410 UVP-E is equipped with Avia V 510 five-blade propellers.

The L 410 UVP-E20 is certified on the basis of FAR 23 either Amendment 34 or Amendment 41. It is certified by the European Union, the Russian Federation, the United States, Brazil, Argentina, Chile, Peru, Venezuela, Cuba, India, Nepal, Philippines, Korea, Indonesia, Republic of South Africa, Algeria, Australia, Taiwan, Turkey, and many other countries accepting some of the previous certificates. The aircraft has also been approved for operation in a number of other countries, such as Kenya, Tanzania, Uganda, Tunisia, Colombia, Venezuela, South Korea and others. The airplane is certified for IFR operation, CAT I ILS approaches, and flights in icing conditions.

== Variants ==
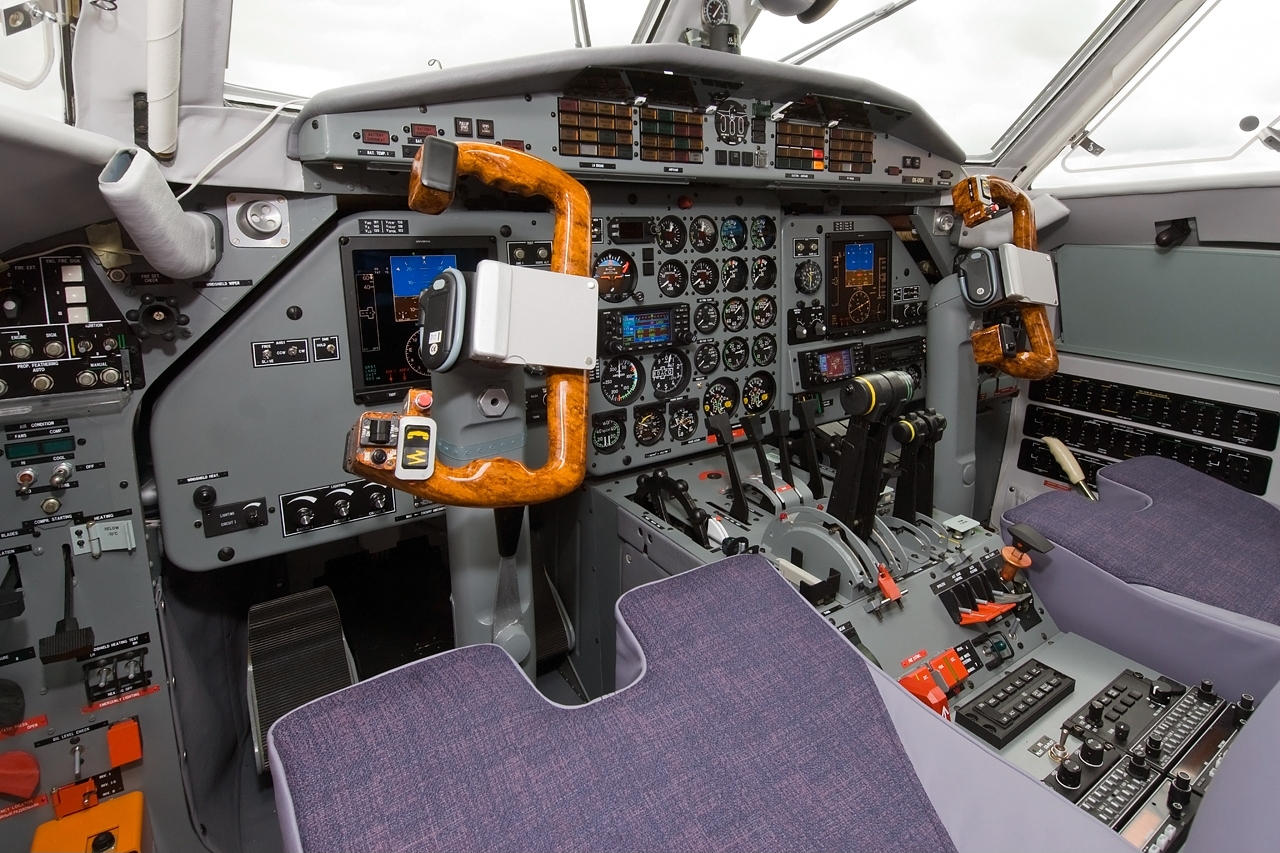
Cockpit of a L-410UVP-E

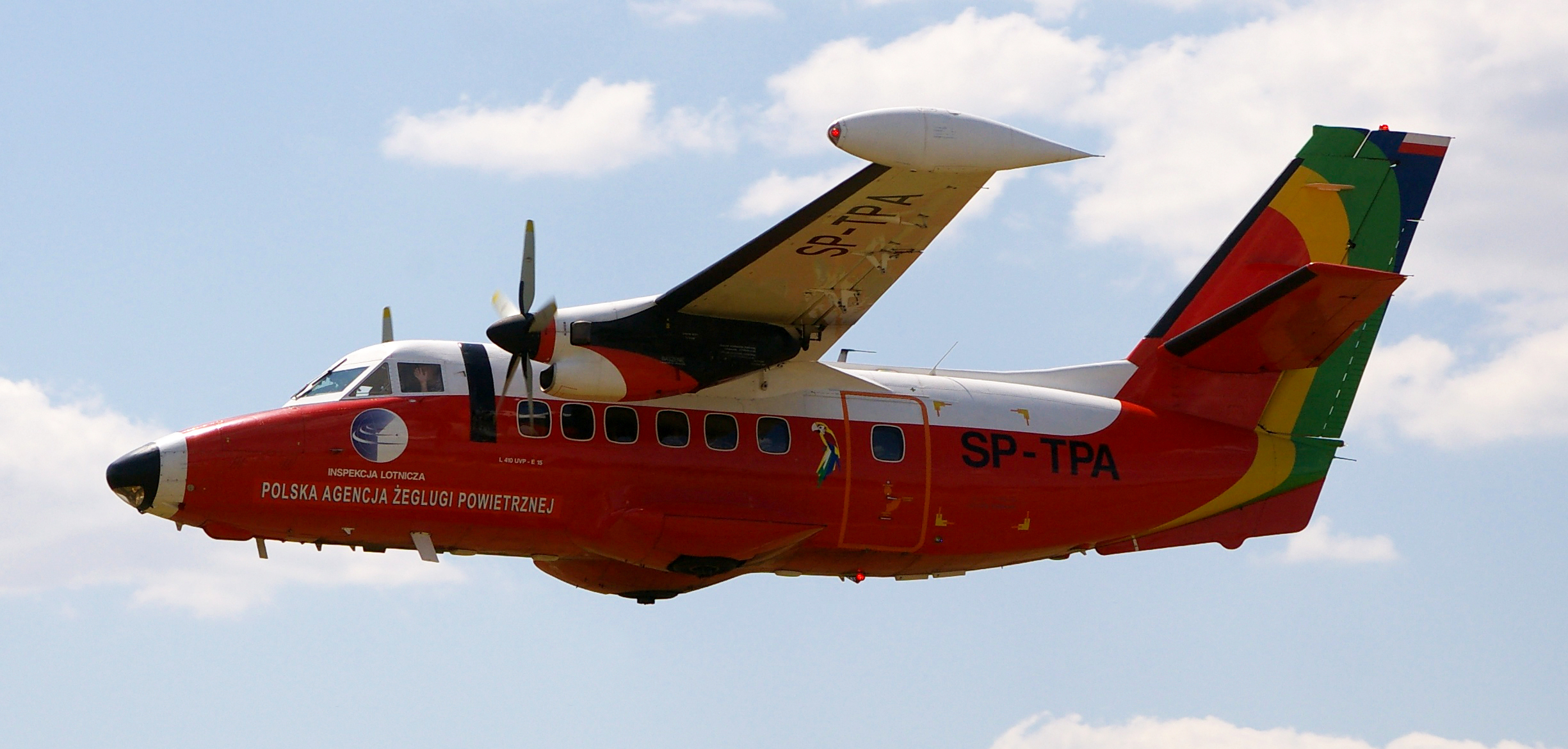
A L-410UVP-E16 of PANSA in flight

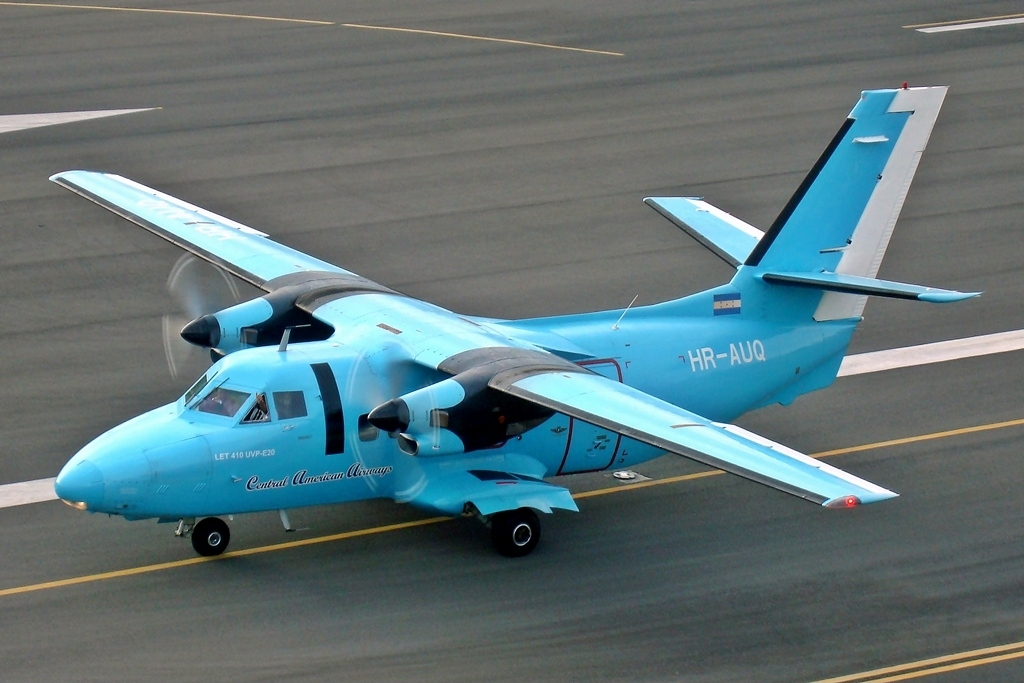
A L-410UVP-E20 taxiing. This aircraft fatally crashed in 2011.

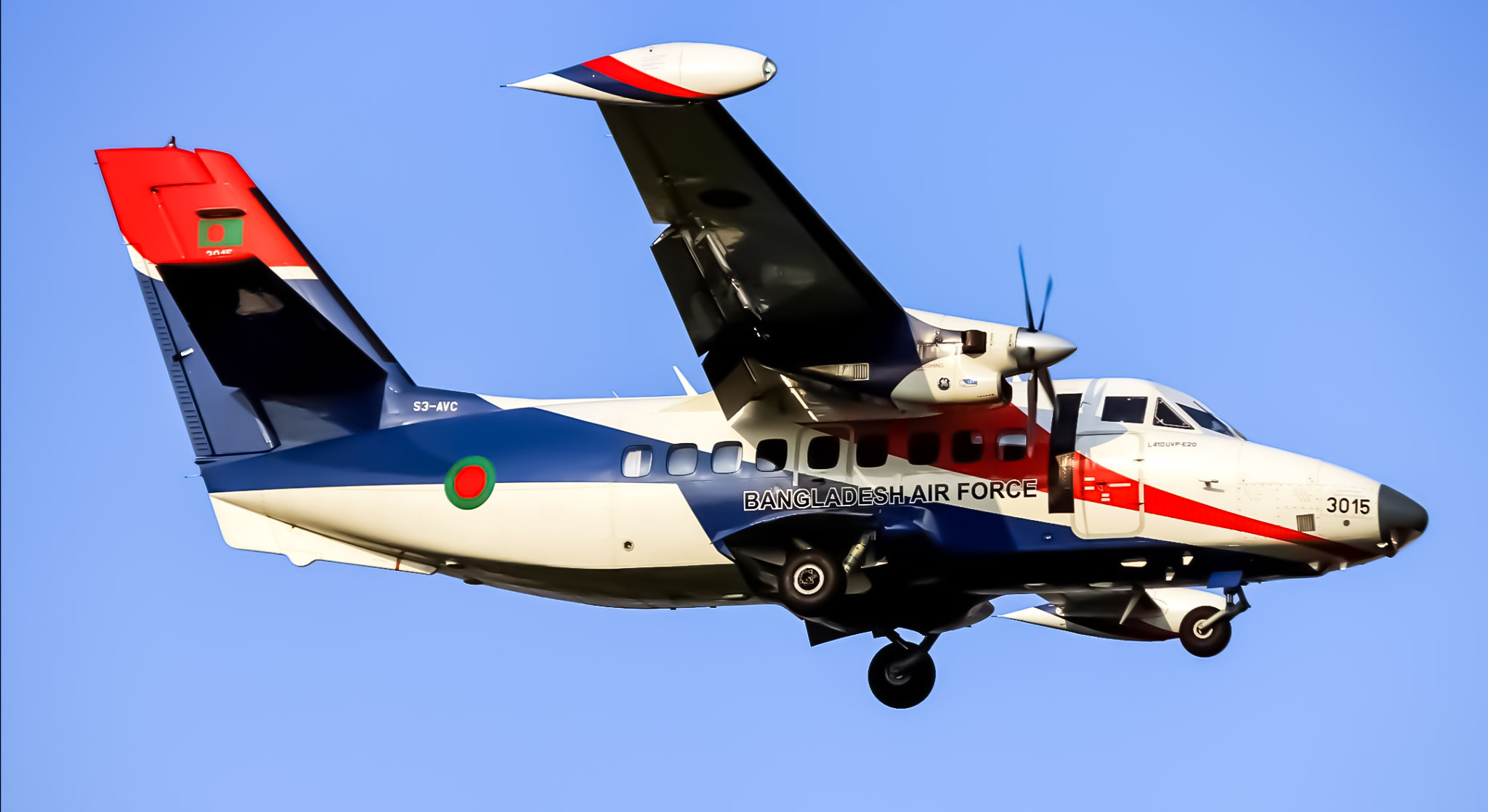
Bangladesh Air Force L-410UVP-E20

- L-410: Prototype, three units built.
- L-410A: First series with Pratt & Whitney PT6A-27 turboprop engines and three-blade Hartzell HC-B3TN-3D propellers. 25 built.
  - L-410AB: Version with four-blade Hartzell HC-B4TN-3 propellers.
  - L-410AF: Aerial photography and cartography version with glazed nose and fixed nose wheel. One built.
  - L-410AS: Ten examples for the Soviet market, with upgraded navigation and communication equipment
- L-410M: Second series with Walter M601A engines and three-blade Avia V508 propellers.
  - L-410MA: Version with M601Bs and Avia V508B propellers, also known as L-410MU.
- L-410UVP: (Ukorochennaya vzlot-posadka, "short take-off and landing") Third series, fundamentally modified. The principal changes are a trunk, an extended wingspan by 0.80 m (2.6 ft), M601Bs (M601Ds after 1983) with Avia V508B (V508D after 1983) propellers, and a higher horizontal stabilizer. The UVP variants possesses STOL characteristics. Passenger capacity fell to 15 due to increased weight.
  - L-410FG: Identical to L-410AF, but based on the L-410UVP
  - L-410T: Transport variant of UVP with larger loading hatch (1.25 by 1.46 metres or 4.1 by 4.8 feet), can transport 6 stretchers as a medical airplane with a medic, or 12 parachutists. It can also carry 1,000 kg (2,200 lb) of cargo containers.
  - L-410UVP-S: VIP variant of UVP with upward-hinged cabin door.
  - L-410UVP-V: (Vstavka, "insert") 1986 stretched version for 22 passengers; remained a prototype.
- L-410UVP-E: (ekonomicheskiy, "economic") Fourth series, improved L-410UVP with M601E or E-21 engines, five-bladed Avia V510 propellers and optional tip-tanks. The rear baggage compartment was also redesigned, increasing capacity back to 19.
  - L-410UVP-E1: Two examples for Bulgaria, reportedly in a photography/transport role
  - L-410UVP-E2: Modified version for the Polish Maritime Office
  - L-410UVP-E3: Version for skydive operations
  - L-410UVP-E4:
  - L-410UVP-E6: Navaid calibration version
  - L-410UVP-E8:
- L-410UVP-E9: Identical to L-410UVP-E, but with increased MTOM and MLM.
  - L-410UVP-E9A: Version for Swedish market with Bendix/King avionics
  - L-410UVP-E9D: One example modified with a Bendix/King EFIS cockpit system
  - L-410UVP-E13:
  - L-410UVP-E14: Version with Bendix/King avionics for transporting military dignitaries
  - L-410UVP-E15:
  - L-410UVP-E16:
  - L-410UVP-E17: Version for Polish market
  - L-410UVP-E19:
- L-410UVP-E20: Westernized version to US FAR-23 standards; certified as the L-420E
  - L-410UVP-E20C: Version for South Africa
  - L-410UVP-E20D: VIP version for government use
  - L-410UVP-E20G: Version for the Tunisian Armed Forces
  - L-410UVP-E27: Four examples for high altitude operations in India
- L-410UVP-EPT: A L-410UVP-E9 converted to PT6A-42 engines and Avia AV-725 five-blade propellers. One built.
- L-420: upgraded L-410 UVP-E - new M601Fs, certified variant of the L-410UVP-E20
- L 410 NG: Substantially redesigned and expanded version, powered by new GE H85 engines and a glass cockpit. Capable carrying twice as much cargo as well as roughly double the endurance of the original model.

== Operators ==
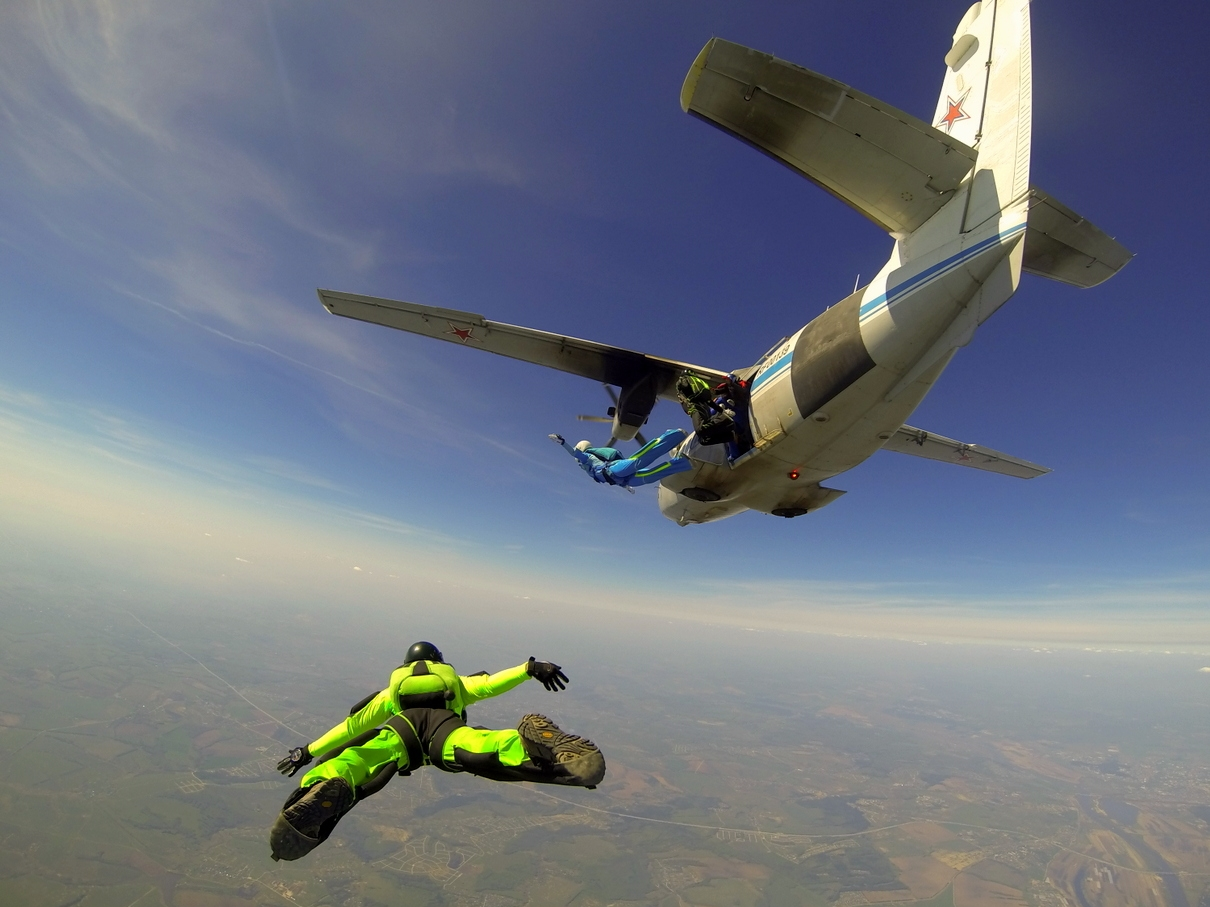
The L-410 has been a popular aircraft for skydivers

Large numbers of L-410s were delivered to the Soviet Union; by 1985, 500 aircraft had reportedly been obtained by various operators within the USSR alone. Accordingly, the type has been heavily operated by various ex-Soviet states, in particular Russia. Furthermore, numerous L-410s have been sold to airlines across Asia, Africa, Central America, and South America. Forty aircraft are in use throughout Europe for commercial operations, including skydiving.

=== Military ===
The Myanmar Air Force uses at least 3 confirmed L-410, delivered in violation of EU sanctions against the Myanmar junta.

=== Civilian ===
In July 2015, 178 Let L-410 were in airline service: 73 in Africa, 58 in Europe, 41 in Americas and 6 in Asia Pacific and the Middle East; its airline operators with four or more aircraft were:

- 25: Air-Tec Global
- 8: Orenburzhie Air Company
- 7: Searca
- 5: Kin Avia, Air Express Algeria and Petropavlovsk-Kamchatsky Air Enterprise
- 4: Eagle Air, Solenta Aviation, 2nd Arkhangelsk United Aviation Division, Van Air Europe, Komiaviatrans, KrasAvia, Air Guyane Express and Comeravia
- 1: Novair

== Accidents and incidents ==
According to statistics, the L-410 has had 118 accidents.

== Specifications (L-410 UVP-E20) ==
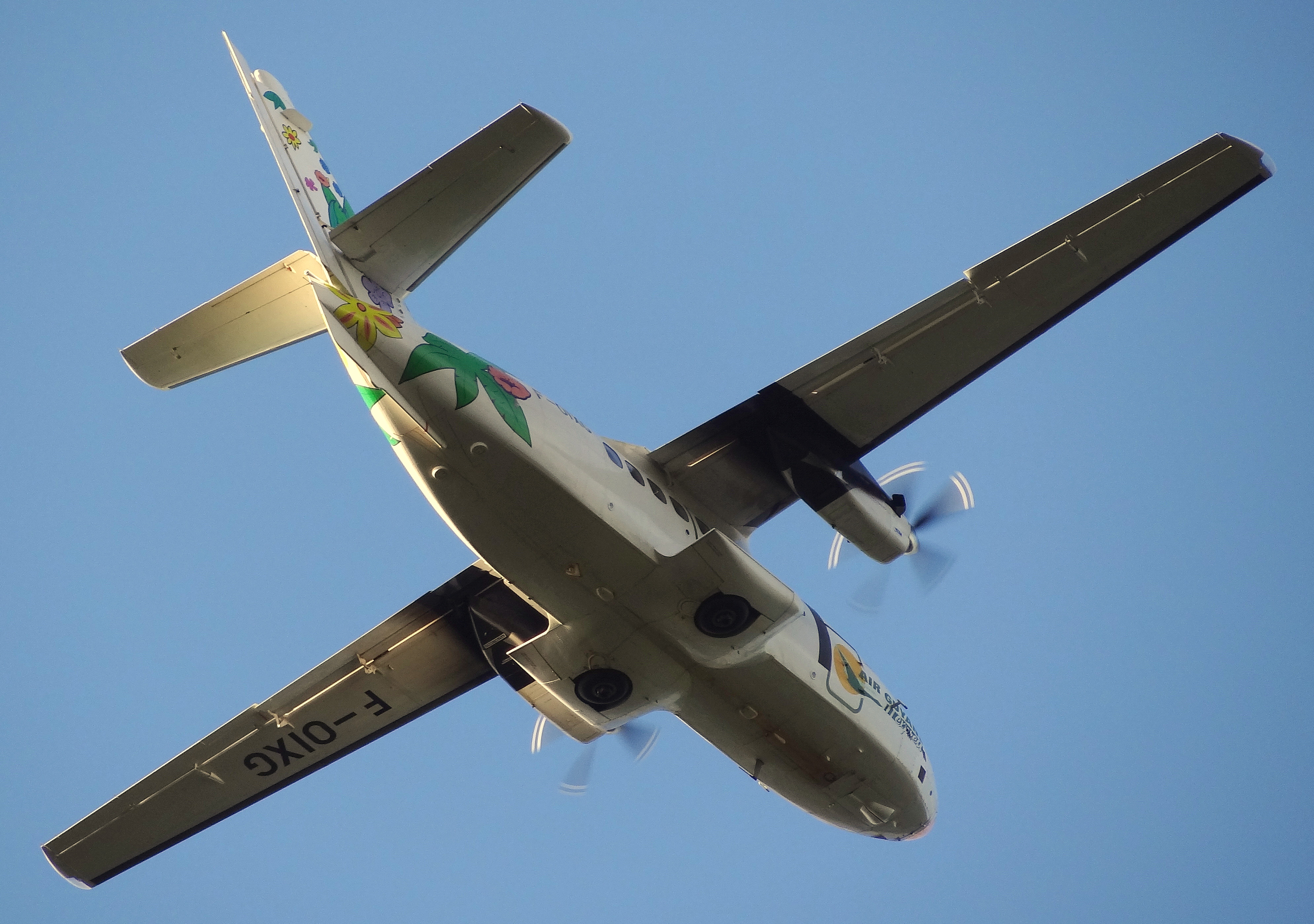
View of an overflying L-410

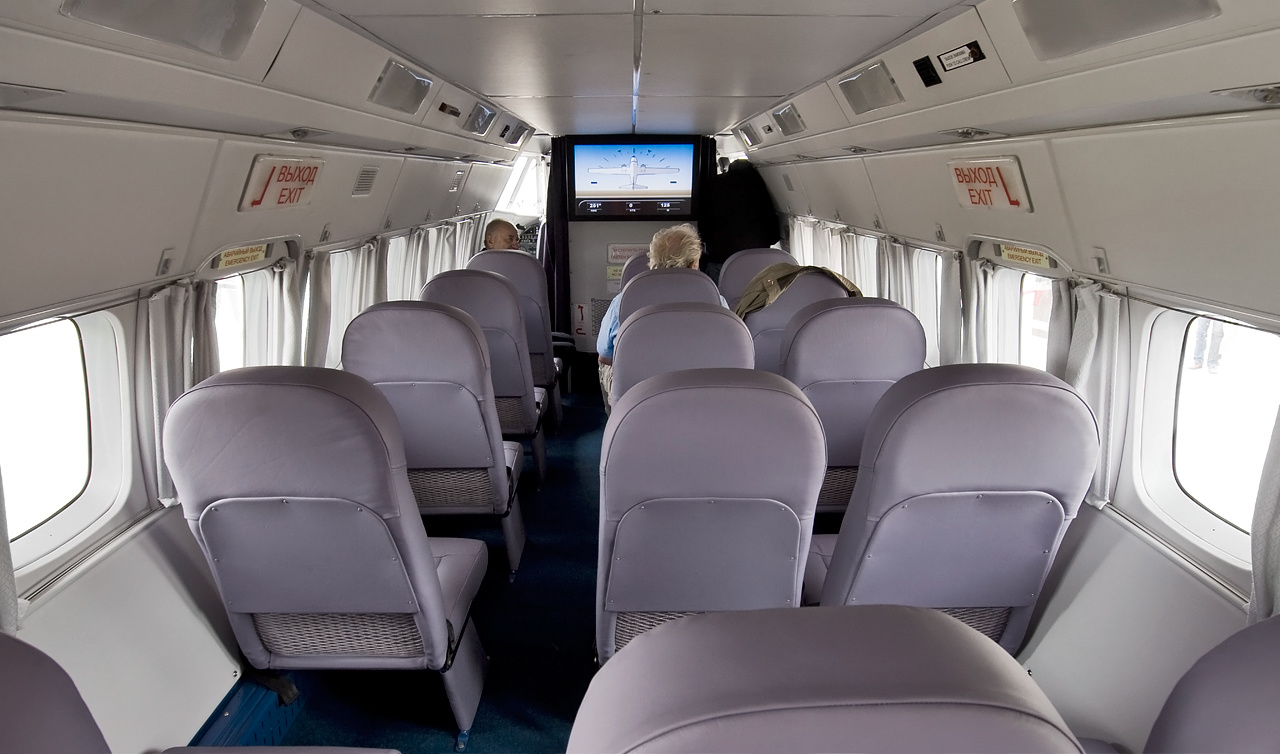
The cabin of a L-410 in a typical commuter configuration

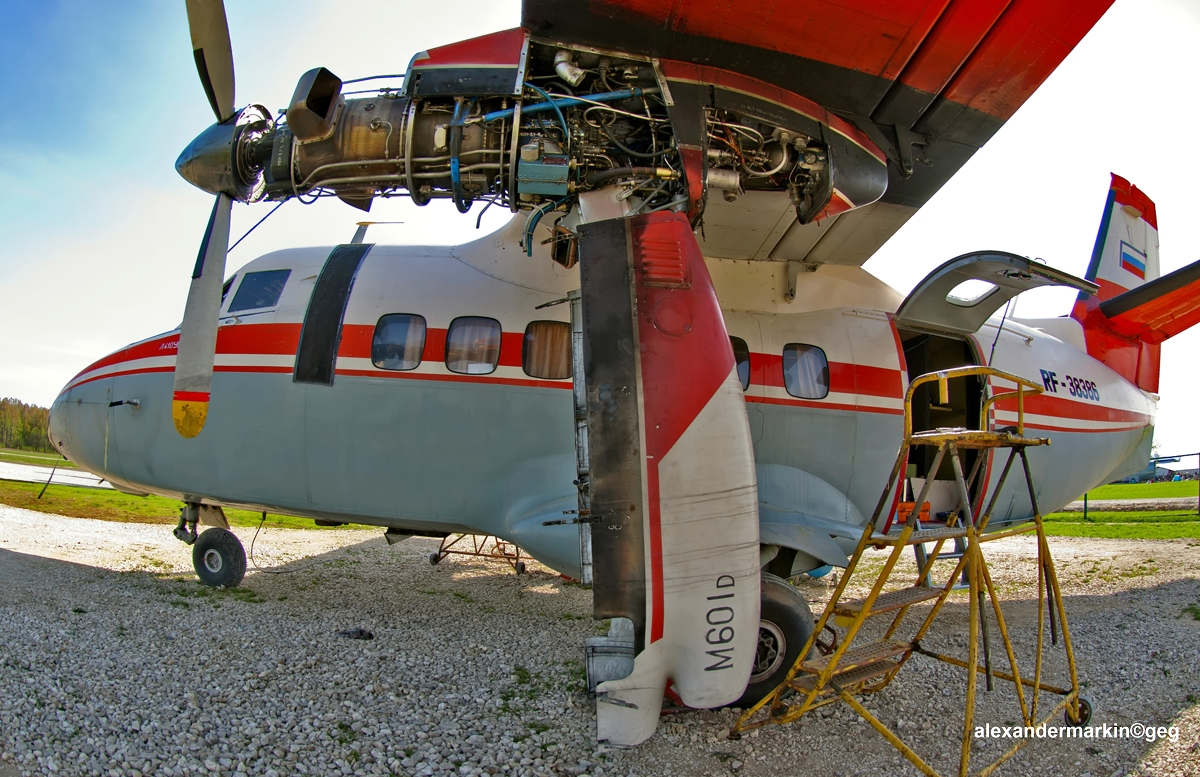
Walter M601 engine upon the wing of a L-410

Data from LET

General characteristics

- Crew: 2
- Capacity: 19 passengers / 1,800 kg (3,968 lb) payload
- Length: 14.42 m (47 ft 4 in)
- Wingspan: 19.98 m (65 ft 7 in)
- Height: 5.97 m (19 ft 7 in)
- Wing area: 34.86 m^{2} (375.2 sq ft)
- Aspect ratio: 11.45
- Airfoil: root: NACA 63A418; tip: NACA 63A412
- Empty weight: 4,200 kg (9,259 lb)
- Max takeoff weight: 6,600 kg (14,551 lb)
- Fuel capacity: 1,300 kg (2,866 lb)
- Powerplant: 2 × General Electric H80-200 turboprop engines, 597 kW (801 hp) each
- Propellers: 5-bladed Avia AV 725, 2.3 m (7 ft 7 in) diameter

Performance

- Cruise speed: 405 km/h (252 mph, 219 kn) max cruise
- Range: 1,500 km (930 mi, 810 nmi) 1,800 kg (3,968 lb) payload, ISA, FL140, 45 min reserve
- Endurance: Five hours and six minutes
- Service ceiling: 8,382 m (27,500 ft)
- Rate of climb: 8.5 m/s (1,670 ft/min)
- Fuel consumption: 240 kg/h (529 lb/h)
- Take-off run: 510 m (1,670 ft) (ISA, SL, MTOW)
- Landing run: 500 m (1,600 ft) (ISA, SL, MTOW)

== See also ==
Related development

- Aircraft Industries L 410 NG
- Let L-610

Aircraft of comparable role, configuration, and era

- Antonov An-28/PZL M28 Skytruck
- Beriev Be-30
- Britten-Norman Trislander
- CASA C-212 Aviocar
- Cessna SkyCourier
- de Havilland Canada DHC-6 Twin Otter
- Dornier 228
- Embraer EMB 110 Bandeirante
- Harbin Y-12
- IAI Arava
- Short SC.7 Skyvan
