= Technoavia Rysachok =

Utility aircraft

Rysachok
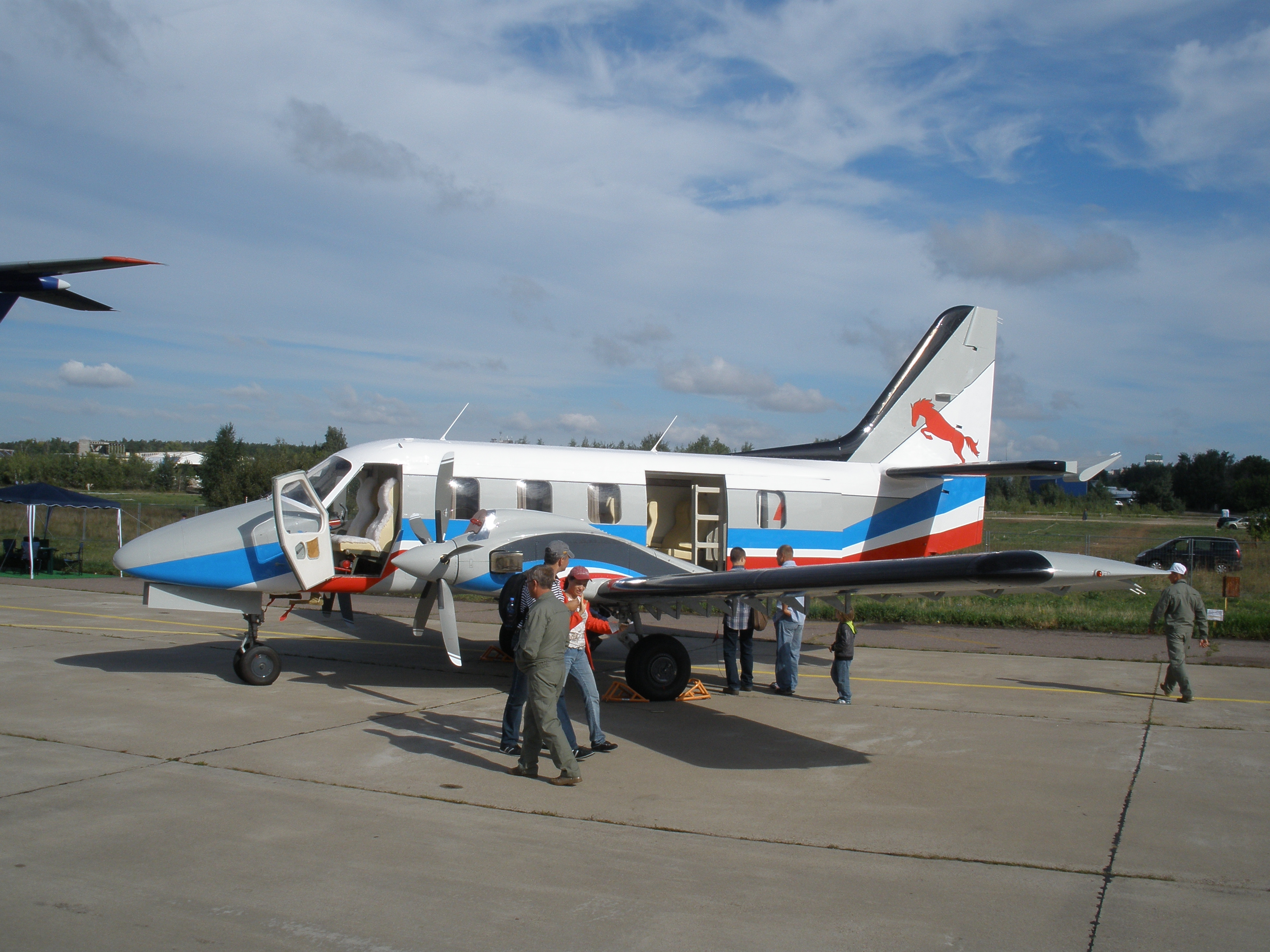
- Rysachove at MAKS '11 airshow

General information
- Type: Twin engine utility aircraft
- National origin: Russia
- Manufacturer: Technoavia
- Status: Certification on hold (as of 2015)
- Number built: Five airframes, two static, by 2011

History
- First flight: 3 December 2010

The Technoavia Rysachok (Ru:Рысачок, English: Trotter) is a general purpose, twin turboprop-powered engined light utility aircraft, designed and built in Russia by Technoavia. Certification was expected by 2012 and by autumn 2011 three flight pre-production examples had been completed and flown. As of 2015 the certification process is stalled and Technoavia has declared that it is no longer involved in the project.

== Design and development ==
The Rysachok programme development began in 2006. It was designed as a twin engine conversion trainer but is now seen more generally as an Antonov An-2 replacement in medical, survey, parachuting, navigator and air engineer training and other light transport roles.

The Rysachok is a conventionally laid out low wing, twin engine monoplane. Outboard of the engines the wings have constant chord and blunt wing tips; inboard, the chord increases toward the fuselage via sweep on the trailing edge. The starboard aileron carries a trim tab and the wing has two-section flaps. The tailplane, mounted at the top of the fuselage, has constant chord. The fin is straight edged and swept. All the tail surfaces have trim tabs and are horn balanced.

The Rysachok has a flat sided fuselage with, on each side, a cockpit crew door and four square windows. On the port side the rearmost window is in a wide, sliding freight door behind the wing. Nineteen can be carried in an all-passenger configuration; the navigation/engineer training layout allows for up to nine students and instructors with appropriate repeat instrumentation. The Rysachok can carry six stretcher cases and a medical attendant in its medical evacuation form.

Current pre-production aircraft are powered by 580 kW (778 hp) Walter M601F turboprop engines, later production models will have 596 kW (800 hp) General Electric H80 turboprops a development of the M601. The Rysachok has a tricycle undercarriage with inward retracting single mainwheels and a forward retracting twin nosewheel.

The Rysachok first flew on 3 December 2010. By mid-2011, five pre-production airframes had been completed. Two were for static testing, two are at the TsAGI flight research institute and a fifth is undergoing flight trials for certification, expected in 2012. Reports on orders differ: Jane's 2011/12 notes a 2008 order for thirty from a "government transport agency" but Flightglobal's more recent account claims "no firm orders" in mid-2011.

The Technoavia Rysachok made its first flight with General Electric H80 engines in March 2014. A 2014 report predicted that production would start in 2015.

== Specifications (prototype) ==
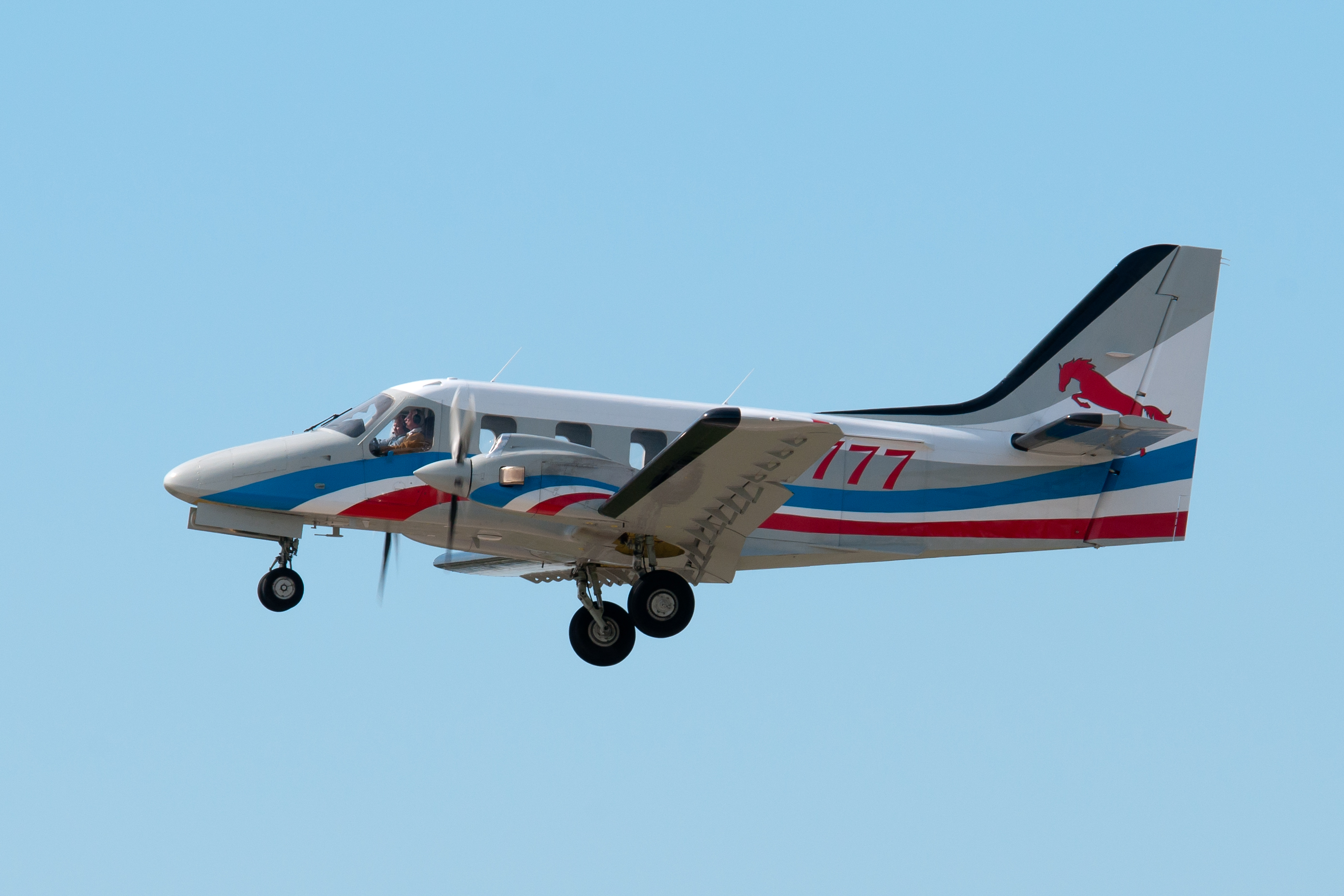
Technoavia Rysachok demonstrated at MAKS 2011

Data from All the World's Aircraft.

General characteristics

- Crew: 1
- Capacity: up to 19 passengers (longer version)
- Length: 12.44 m (40 ft 10 in)
- Wingspan: 18.00 m (59 ft 1 in)
- Height: 5.38 m (17 ft 8 in)
- Wing area: 30.50 m^{2} (328.3 sq ft) gross
- Aspect ratio: 10.6
- Empty weight: 2,770 kg (6,107 lb)
- Max takeoff weight: 5,700 kg (12,566 lb)
- Fuel capacity: 1,900 L (502 US gal; 418 Imp gal); maximum weight 1,520 kg (2,620lb)
- Maximum payload:1,570 kg (3,461 lb)
- Powerplant: 2 × Walter M601F turboprop, 580 kW (780 hp) each
- Propellers: 5-bladed, 2.30 m (7 ft 7 in) diameter

Performance

- Cruise speed: 391 km/h (243 mph, 211 kn) maximum, economical 251 km/h (156 mph; 135 kn)
- Range: 2,000 km (1,200 mi, 1,100 nmi)
- Ferry range: 2,480 km (1,540 mi, 1,340 nmi)
- Endurance: 9 hr 30 min
- Service ceiling: 6,000 m (20,000 ft)
- Wing loading: 186.9 kg/m^{2} (38.3 lb/sq ft)
