= Aircraft Industries L 410 NG =

Twin-engine short-range transport aircraft

L 410 NG
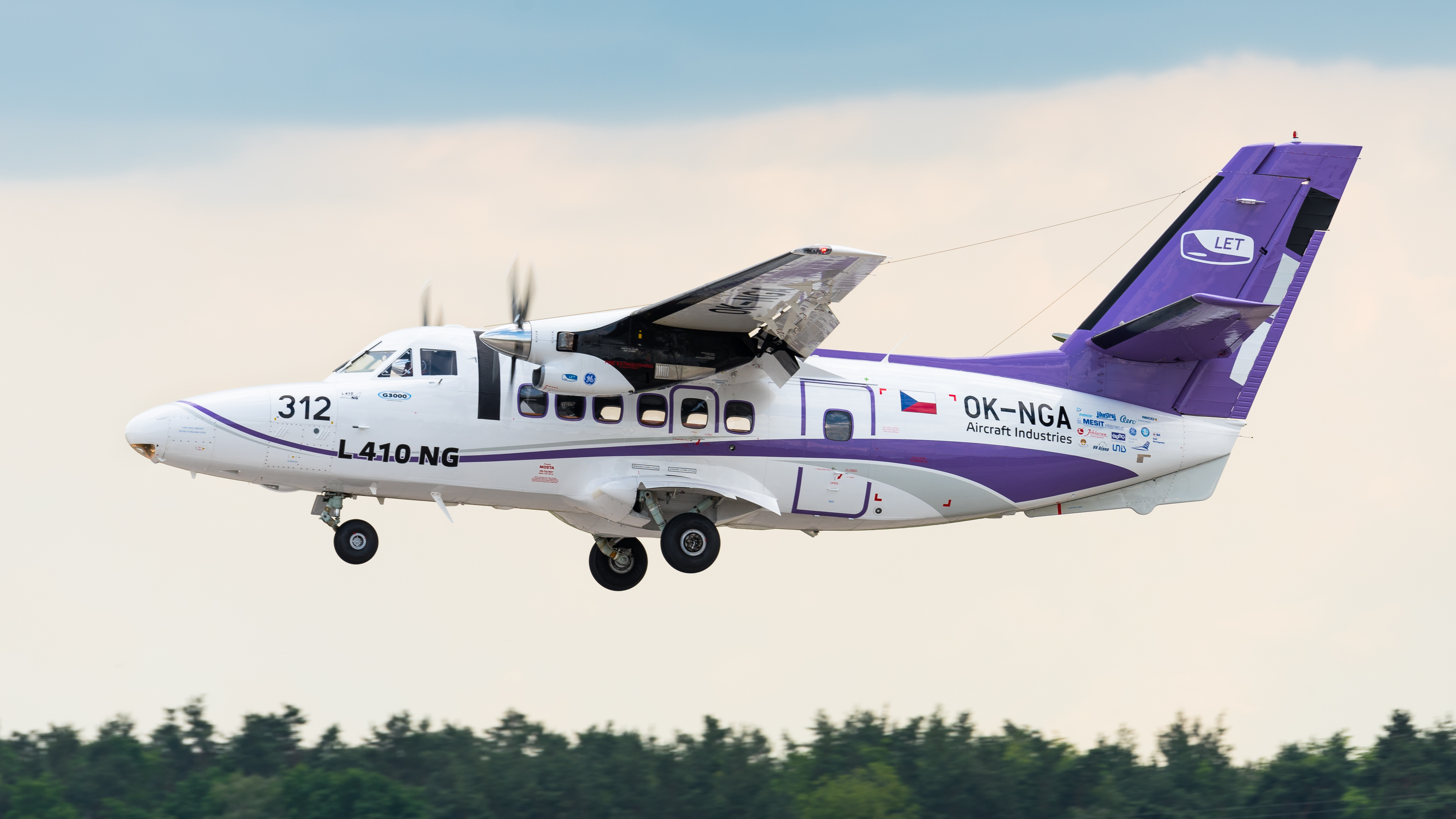

General information
- Type: Regional airliner, cargo aircraft
- National origin: Czech Republic
- Manufacturer: Aircraft Industries (Let Kunovice)
- Status: In service
- Primary users: Aerocardal, Air Senegal, Shohin Airlines
- Number built: 18

History
- Manufactured: 2018–present
- First flight: 29 July 2015
- Developed from: Let L-410 Turbolet

Aircraft Industries L 410 NG ("New Generation") is a twin-engine 19-seat aircraft manufactured by the Czech company, Aircraft Industries (formerly Let Kunovice). The aircraft is an upgraded version of the Let L 410 UVP-E20. The first flight took place on 29 July 2015. Serial production of the L 410 NG began in March 2018.

== Development ==
The development of the modernized L 410 was launched in 2010. The first prototype L 410 NG was first presented to the public on July 15, 2015 at Kunovice Airport in Slovácko. The first flight took place on July 29, 2015 at Kunovice Airport. The basic flight characteristics and performance of the airplane, as well as proper operation of the airplane control system, propulsion unit, fuel system, avionics and navigation systems have been verified.

== Design ==
Compared to previous models, the L 410 NG has significant changes. It comes with new, more powerful GE H85-200 engines, combined with quieter AV-725 propellers; a new wing design featuring an integrated fuel tank; a more modern cockpit from Garmin; and a bigger luggage compartment.

With these improvements, the L 410 NG has doubled the maximum distance it can fly and can carry 500 kilograms in increased payload than the previous model. Like its predecessor L 410 UVP-E20, it will be sold in all variations. It is intended for commercial airlines, government agencies, non-governmental organizations, and armed forces. In addition to the passenger version, it can also be configured as a cargo plane. It can be used especially in island states where there is a problem of refueling in remote islands.

== Operational history ==
A series of certification flights were done in accordance with the relevant regulations. Certified by the European Aviation Safety Agency (EASA) and the Russian Interstate Aviation Committee (MAK). Development started in April 2010, costs of the project is 568 million CZK, 237 million was funded by a grant from the Ministry of Industry and Trade of Czech Republic.

In March 2018, serial production started. The first serial produced L 410 NG traveled to a customer in Russia. Production of 16 aircraft is planned for 2019, half of them will be flown to Russia, six aircraft will be delivered to Kazakhstan and two to Poland.

== Specification (L 410NG) ==
Data from L 410

General characteristics

- Crew: 2
- Capacity: 19 passengers / 2,300 kg (5,071 lb) load
- Length: 15.074 m (49 ft 5 in)
- Wingspan: 19.478 m (63 ft 11 in)
- Height: 5.969 m (19 ft 7 in)
- Wing area: 34.86 m^{2} (375.2 sq ft)
- Airfoil: root: NACA 63A418; tip: NACA 63A412
- Cabin volume for passengers: 17.9 m^{3} (632 cu ft)
- Passenger doors: 0.8 m × 1.46 m (2 ft 7 in × 4 ft 9 in)
- Cargo door: 1.25 m × 1.46 m (4 ft 1 in × 4 ft 9 in)
- Seat pitch at max. Capacity: 0.76 m (2 ft 6 in)
- Luggage compartment volume: 2.31 m^{3} (82 cu ft)
- Max takeoff weight: 7,000 kg (15,432 lb)
- Maximum landing weight: 6,800 kg (14,991 lb)
- Fuel capacity: 2,244 kg (4,947 lb)
- Powerplant: 2 × General Electric H85-200 turboprop engines
- Propellers: 5-bladed Avia-725 constant-speed propellers

Performance

- Maximum speed: 417 km/h (259 mph, 225 kn) TAS
- Range: 2,750 km (1,710 mi, 1,480 nmi) at FL140 with reserve fuel
- Endurance: 10 hours 30 minutes
- Service ceiling: 6,100 m (20,000 ft)
- Service ceiling on one engine: 3,900 m (12,800 ft) (ISA, 95% MTOW, 15 m/min (50 ft/min) climb rate )
- Absolute ceiling: 8,230 m (27,000 ft)
- Rate of climb: 8.5 m/s (1,670 ft/min)

1.7 m/s (6 ft/s) on one engine

- Take-off run: 600 m (2,000 ft)
- Landing run: 590 m (1,940 ft)

== See also ==
Related development

- Let L-410 Turbolet

Aircraft of comparable role, configuration, and era

- CASA C-212 Aviocar
- De Havilland Canada DHC-6 Twin Otter
- Dornier 228NG
- Evektor EV-55 Outback
- Indonesian Aerospace N-219
