= Privateer Industries Privateer =

American amphibious amateur-built aircraft

Privateer
- Privateer prototype

General information
- Type: Amateur-built aircraft
- National origin: United States
- Manufacturer: Privateer Industries
- Designer: John Meekins and Bill Husa
- Status: Under development (2018)
- Number built: one prototype (August 2018)

History
- First flight: 6 August 2018

The Privateer Industries Privateer is an American amphibious amateur-built aircraft that was designed by John Meekins and Bill Husa and is under development by Privateer Industries of Florida. It was first flown on 6 August 2018. The aircraft is intended to be supplied as a kit for amateur construction and later type certified and sold as a complete ready-to-fly-aircraft.

== Development ==
The design was conceived by Meekins, who wanted an amphibious aircraft but discovered that all existing designs had safety and performance issues, falling short of his personal requirements. Consequently, he took it upon himself to design his own aircraft. Meekins enlisted assistance from Bill Husa of Orion Technologies in Scottsdale, Arizona and made him chief engineer to work on the design and build the prototype, although Husa died in 2012, before the prototype was completed. Meekins had Embry Riddle Aeronautical University review the design and they reported favorably on it. Meekins established Privateer Industries to manufacture the design and remains chairman & CEO of the company. The development of the aircraft to first flight took over ten years.

== Design ==
The Privateer features a cantilever low-wing, a seven-seat enclosed cabin accessed by doors, retractable tricycle landing gear, as well as fixed floats for water operation, a twin boom tail mounted on the floats, and a single engine in pusher configuration.

The aircraft is made from carbon fiber composites. Its 42.9 ft (13.1 m) span wing is mounted low on the fuselage, which also attaches the integral fixed floats. The aft end of the floats acts as twin tail booms for the twin tail fins, with a single tailplane and elevator mounted high above the pusher propeller. The standard engine used is the Walter M601 turboprop, which produces 724 shp (540 kW) for take-off and 657 hp (490 kW) continuous. The propeller employs a shroud to increase thrust and reduce noise.

== Operational history ==
By August 2018, one example, the prototype, had been registered in the United States with the Federal Aviation Administration.

== Specifications (Privateer prototype) ==
Data from AvWeb and manufacturer

General characteristics

- Crew: one
- Capacity: 5-6 passengers
- Length: 43.0 ft (13.1 m)
- Wingspan: 42.9 ft (13.1 m)
- Height: 12.3 ft (3.7 m) on wheels
- Wing area: 282 sq ft (26.2 m^{2})
- Empty weight: 3,600 lb (1,633 kg)
- Gross weight: 5,600 lb (2,540 kg)
- Powerplant: 1 × Walter M601 turboprop aircraft engine, 724 hp (540 kW)
- Propellers: 3-bladed constant speed, with shroud

Performance

- Cruise speed: 215 kn (247 mph, 398 km/h) at 15,000 ft
- Range: 870 nmi (1,000 mi, 1,600 km)
- Service ceiling: 25,000 ft (7,600 m)
- Rate of climb: 2,100 ft/min (11 m/s)
- Wing loading: 19.8 lb/sq ft (97 kg/m^{2})

== See also ==
- List of flying boats and floatplanes
