= Walter M601 =

1960s Czech turboprop aircraft engine

M601
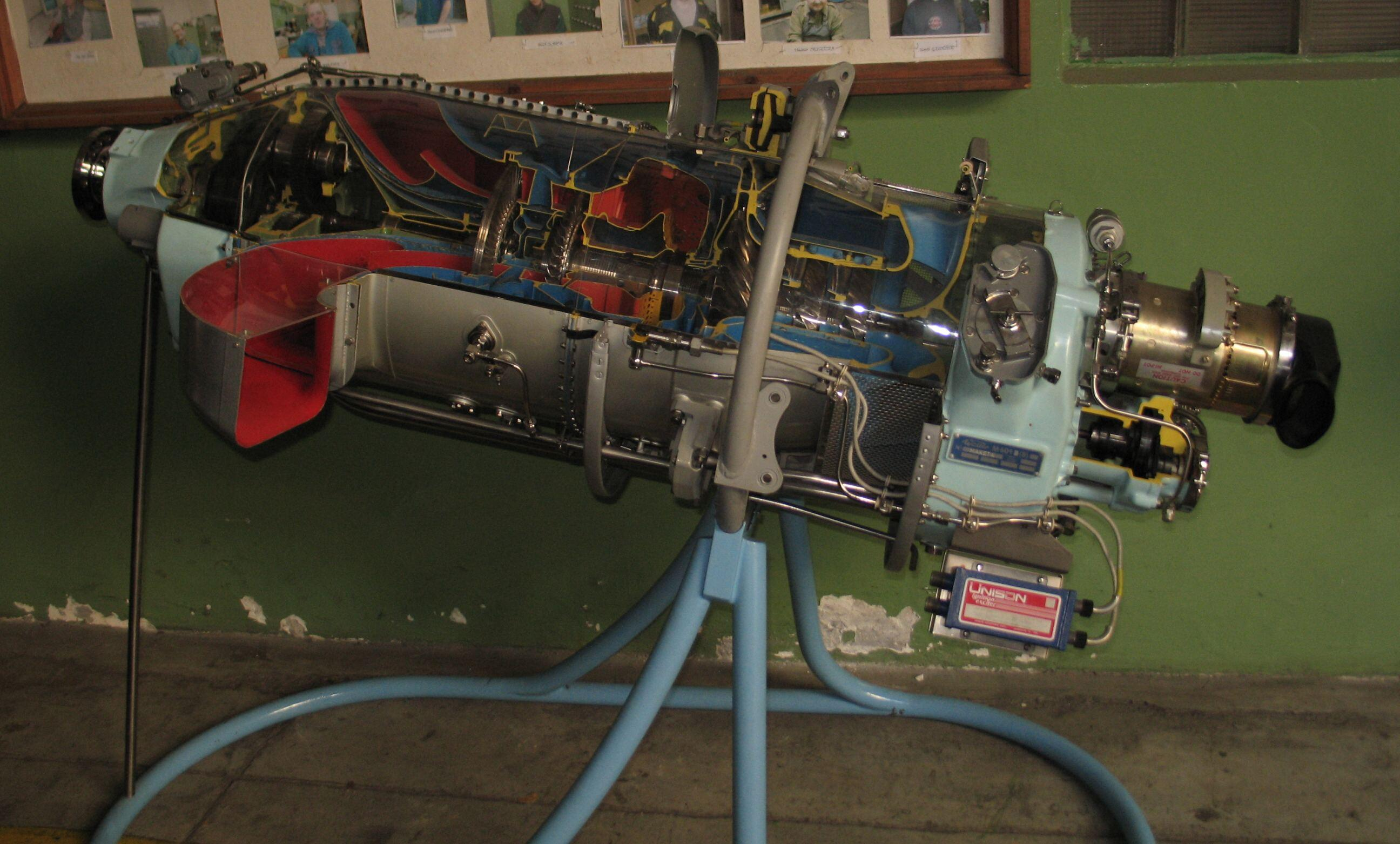
- Partially sectioned M601E
- Type: Turboprop
- National origin: Czech Republic
- Manufacturer: Walter Aircraft Engines
- First run: 1967
- Major applications: Let L-410 Turbolet; PAC FU-24 Fletcher; PZL-130 Orlik
- Developed into: GE Aerospace Czech H80

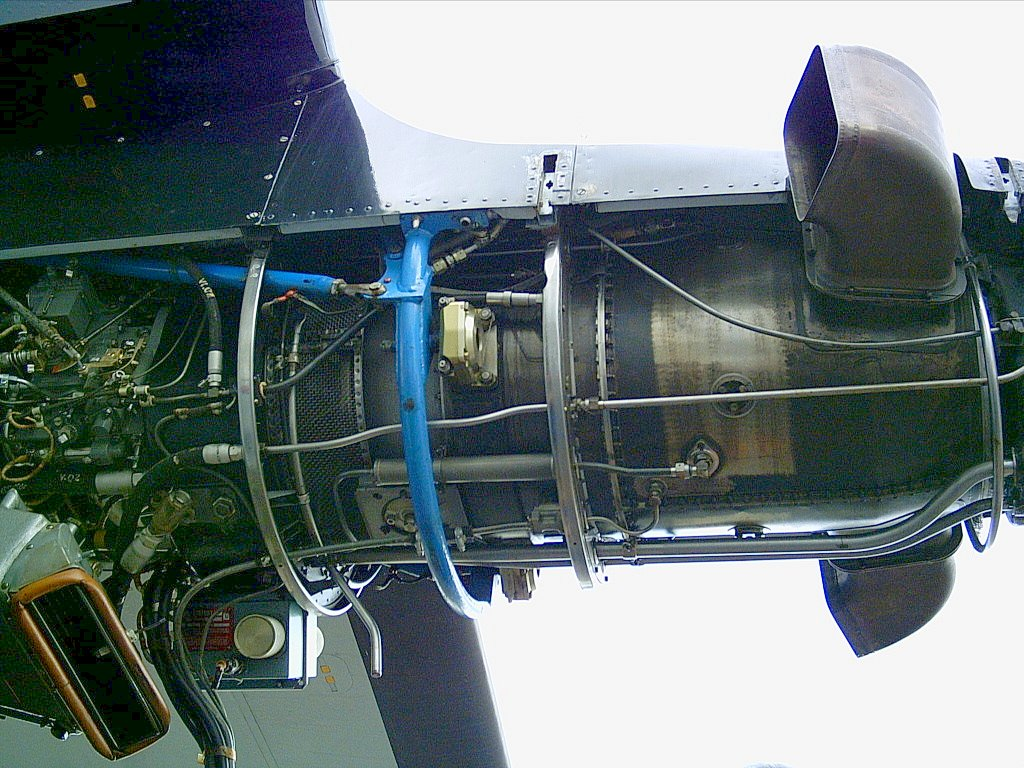
An M601 mounted on an L-410 UVP in the Kbely museum, Prague

The Walter M601 is a turboprop aircraft engine produced by Walter Aircraft Engines of the Czech Republic. The company's first turboprop, the M601 is used in business, agricultural and military training aircraft.

== Development ==
The turboprop was designed for use on the Let L-410 and the M601 first ran in 1967. It was not suitable for the prototype L-410 and the company developed an upgraded version, the M601A, with a slightly wider diameter.

== Variants ==
M601A
Initial production variant for early version of the Let L410.
M601B
Production variant for the Let L410UVP.
M601D
Developed for the Let L410UVP.
M601D-1
Agricultural variant for high-cycle operation, used on the PZL Kruk and Ayres Thrush.
M601D-2
Special variant for paradrop aircraft, used on the Do 28 and some Finist conversions.
M601D-11
Agricultural and paradrop variant with a higher Time Between Overhaul of up to 1800 hours.
M601D-11NZ
Downrated variant for use in the FU-24 Fletcher.
M601E
Developed for the Let L410UVP-E.
M601E-11
General use engine with sub-variants of differing TBO.
M601E-11A
Variant of the 11 for use at higher operating altitudes and modified with a low pressure bleed air system for pressurised aircraft.
M601E-21
Variant for the L410-UVP-E used for hot and high operations.
M601F
Variant intended for use on the L420.
M601FS
M601F-11
M601F-22
M601F-32
M601FS
M601T
Aerobatic variant for use on the PZL Orlik.
M601H-80
now the GE Aerospace Czech H80
M601Z
Agricultural variant for use on the Z-37T.

== Applications ==
- Aerocomp Comp Air 7
- Ayres Thrush
- Lancair Propjet
- Let Z-37T - TurboČmelák (AgroTurbo)
- Let L-410 Turbolet
- Let L-420
- Myasishchev/SOKOL M-101T
- PAC FU-24 Fletcher
- Privateer Industries Privateer
- PZL-106 Kruk
- PZL-130 Orlik
- SMG-92 Turbo Finist
- Technoavia Rysachok
- Turbine Legend

== Specification (M601D-1) ==
Data from Walter Engines

==== General characteristics ====
- Type: Turboprop
- Length: 1,675 mm
- Diameter: 590 mm
- Dry weight: 197 kg

==== Components ====
- Compressor: 2-stage axial compressor and 1-stage centrifugal compressor
- Combustors: annular
- Turbine: 1-stage high-pressure and 1-stage free

==== Performance ====
- Maximum power output: 544 kW, 490 kW continuous (740 hp, 657 hp continuous)
- Turbine inlet temperature: 690°C
- Specific fuel consumption: 377 g/kW·h (.62 lb/hp-h)
- Power-to-weight ratio: 2.76:1 (kW:kg)

== See also ==
Related development

- GE Aerospace Czech H80

Comparable engines

- Garrett TPE331
- Klimov VK-800
- Pratt & Whitney Canada PT6

Related lists

- List of aircraft engines
