= Pitts Specials Formation Aerobatic Team =

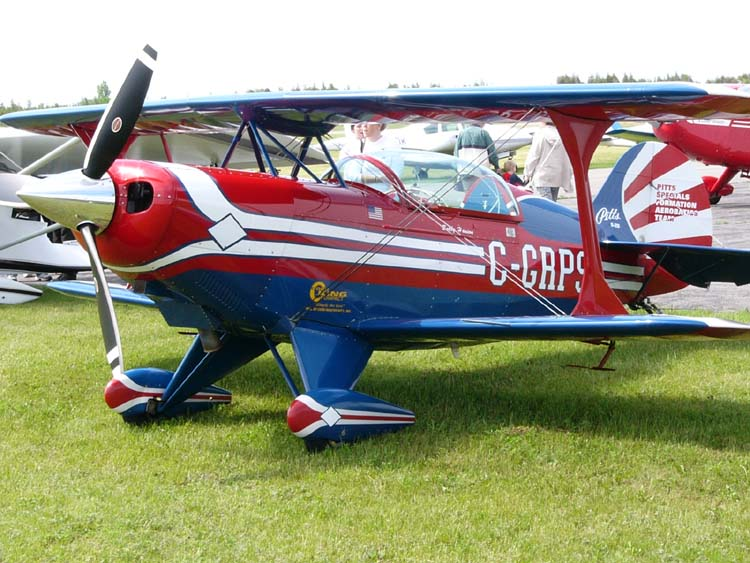
Christen Industries S-2B Pitts Special C-GRPS belonging to the Pitts Specials Team on display at Smiths Falls-Montague Airport Ontario 4 June 2006

The Pitts Specials Formation Aerobatic Team is a civilian airshow team flying Pitts Special S-2B biplanes throughout the United States, Central America and Canada.
