= Pitts Special =

Family of American aerobatic biplanes

Pitts Special S-1 / S-2
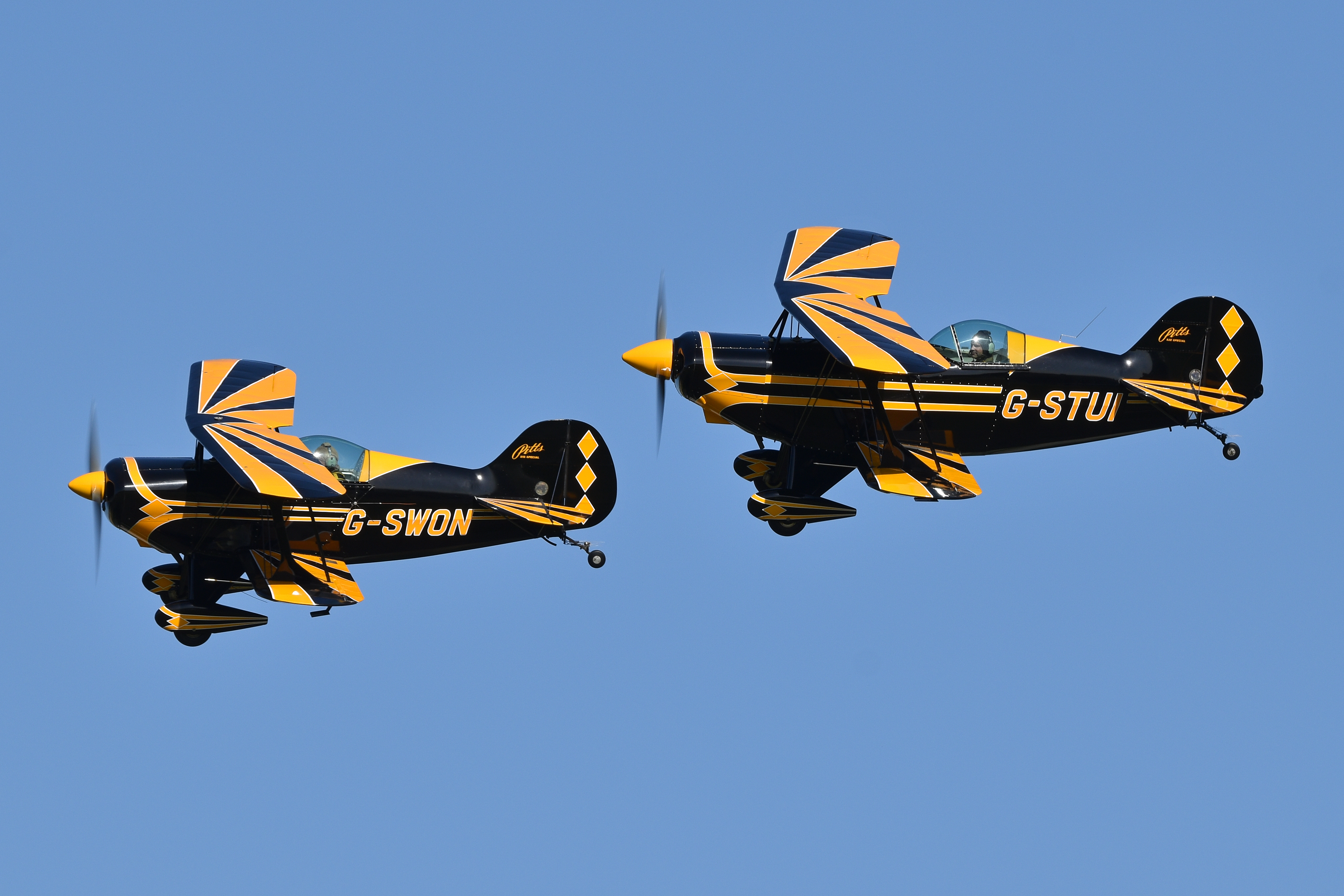
- A Pitts S-1S Special (left) and a modified S-2AE Special (right) in formation in 2021.

General information
- Type: Aerobatic biplane
- National origin: United States
- Manufacturer: Aviat (current)
- Designer: Curtis Pitts
- Status: In production

History
- First flight: September 1944

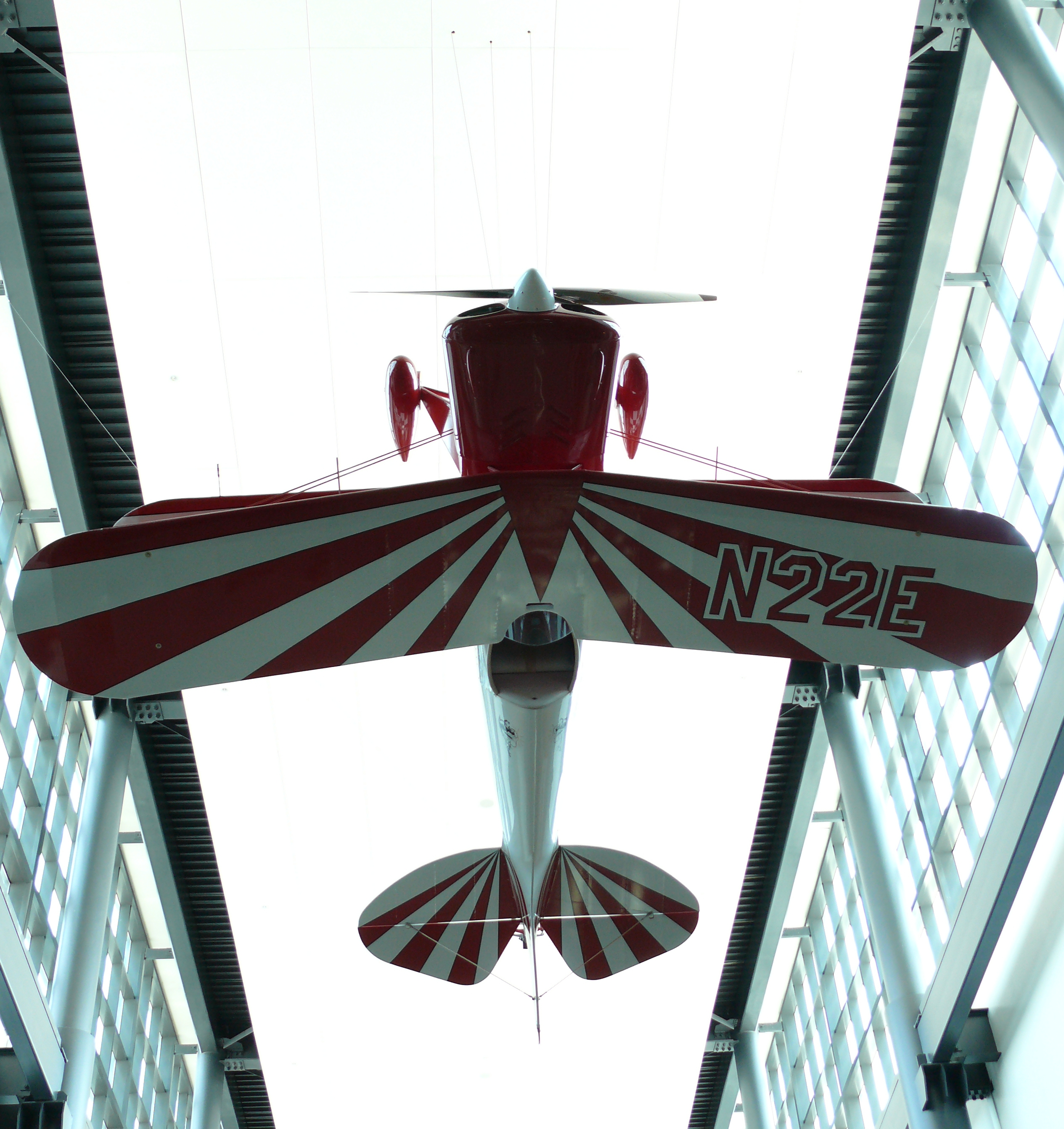
Little Stinker in the Smithsonian

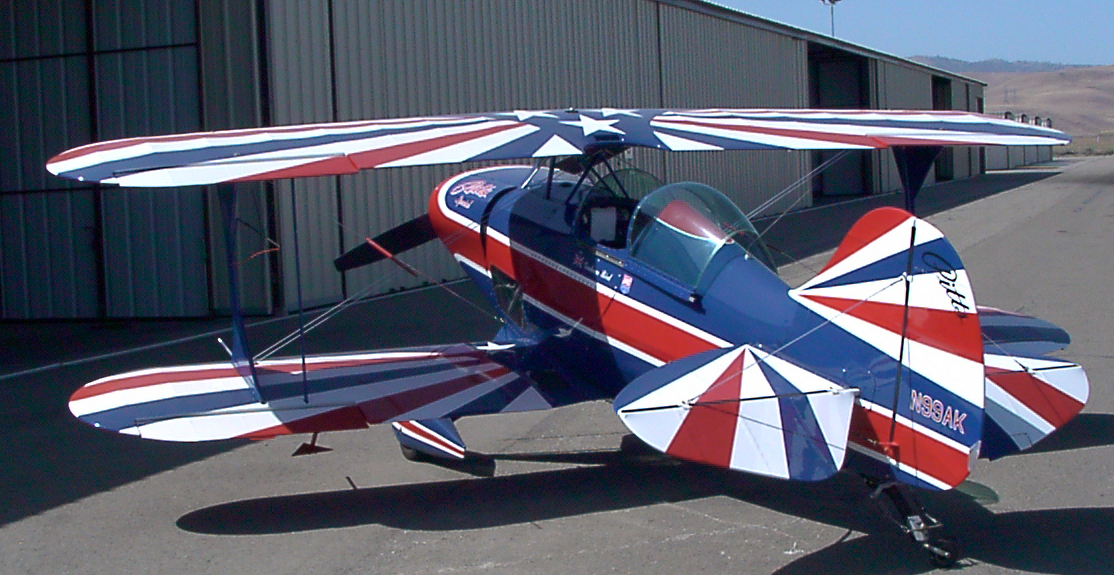
S-1S

Modified S-1S

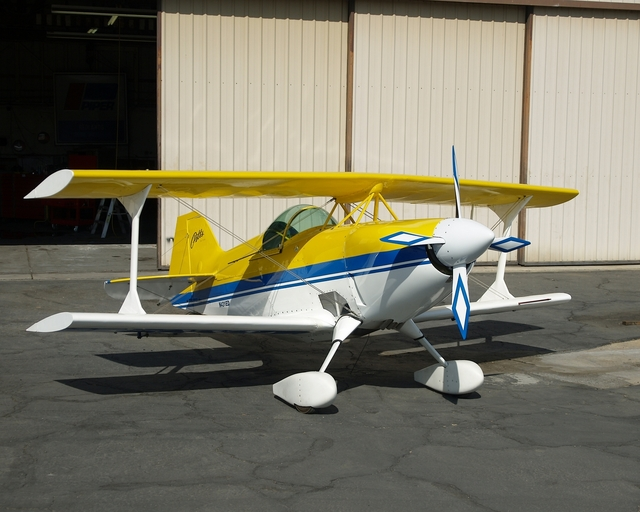
Modified S-1S

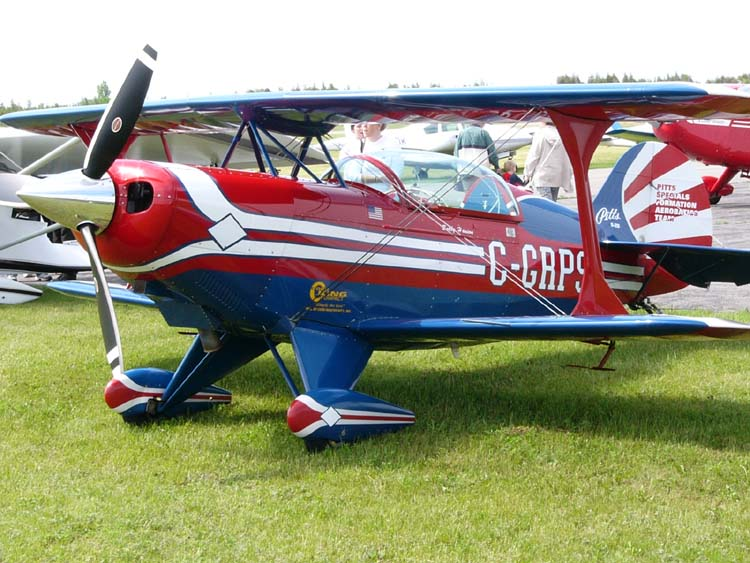
Christen Industries S-2B Pitts Special belonging to the Pitts Specials Formation Aerobatic Team

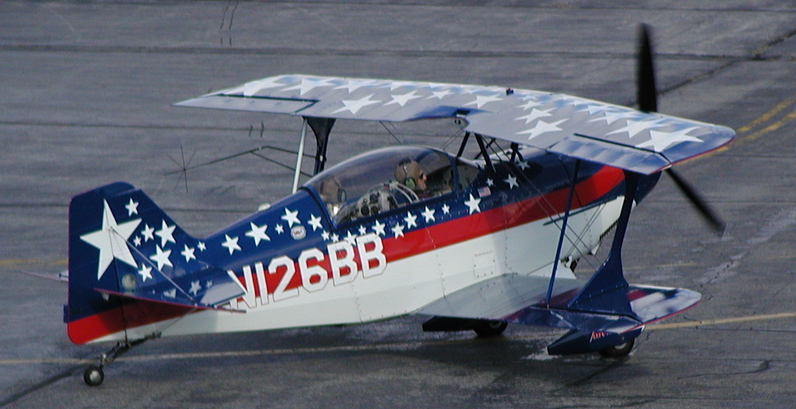
2001 Aviat Pitts S-2C

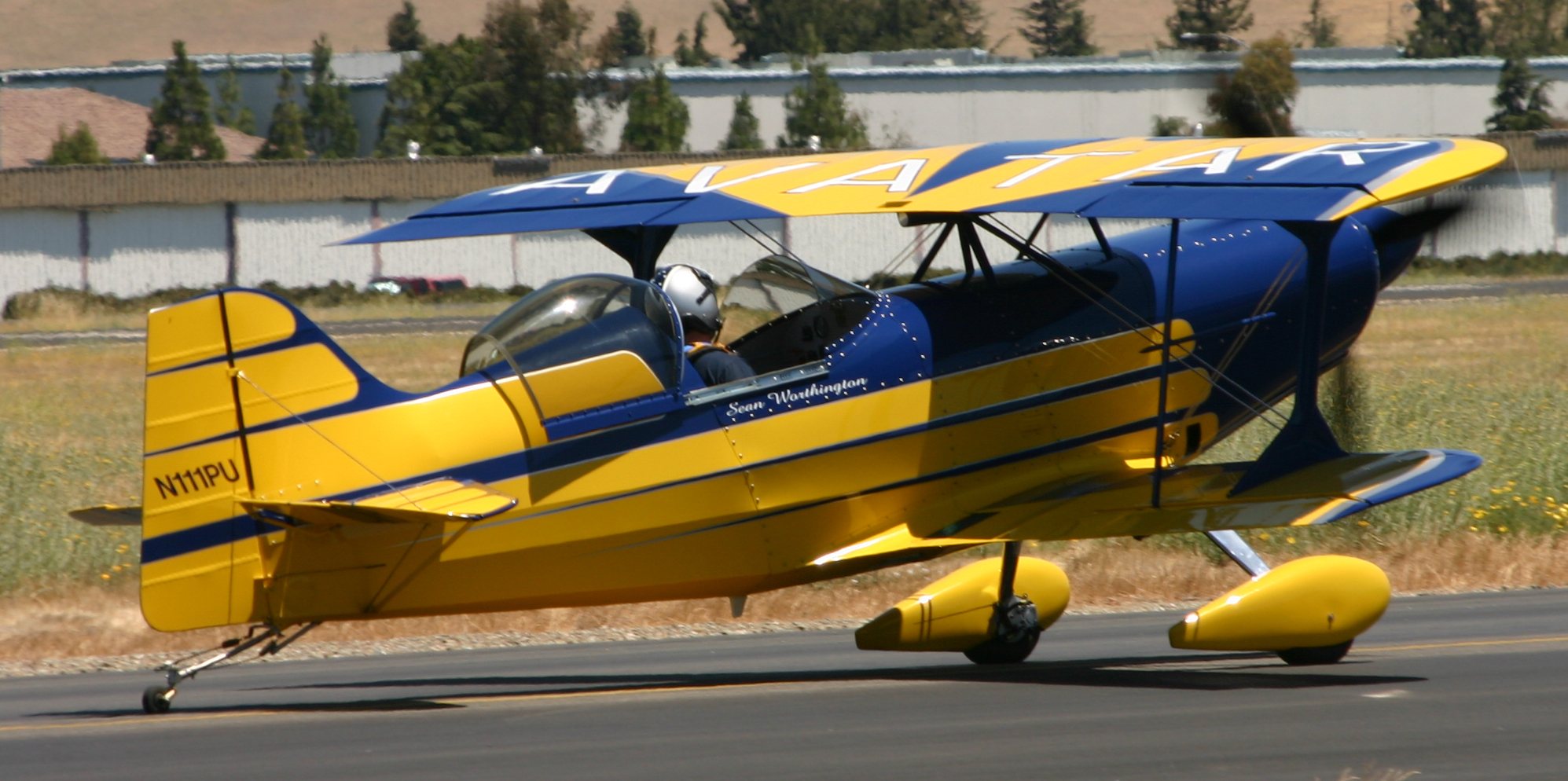
S-1-11B Pitts Special

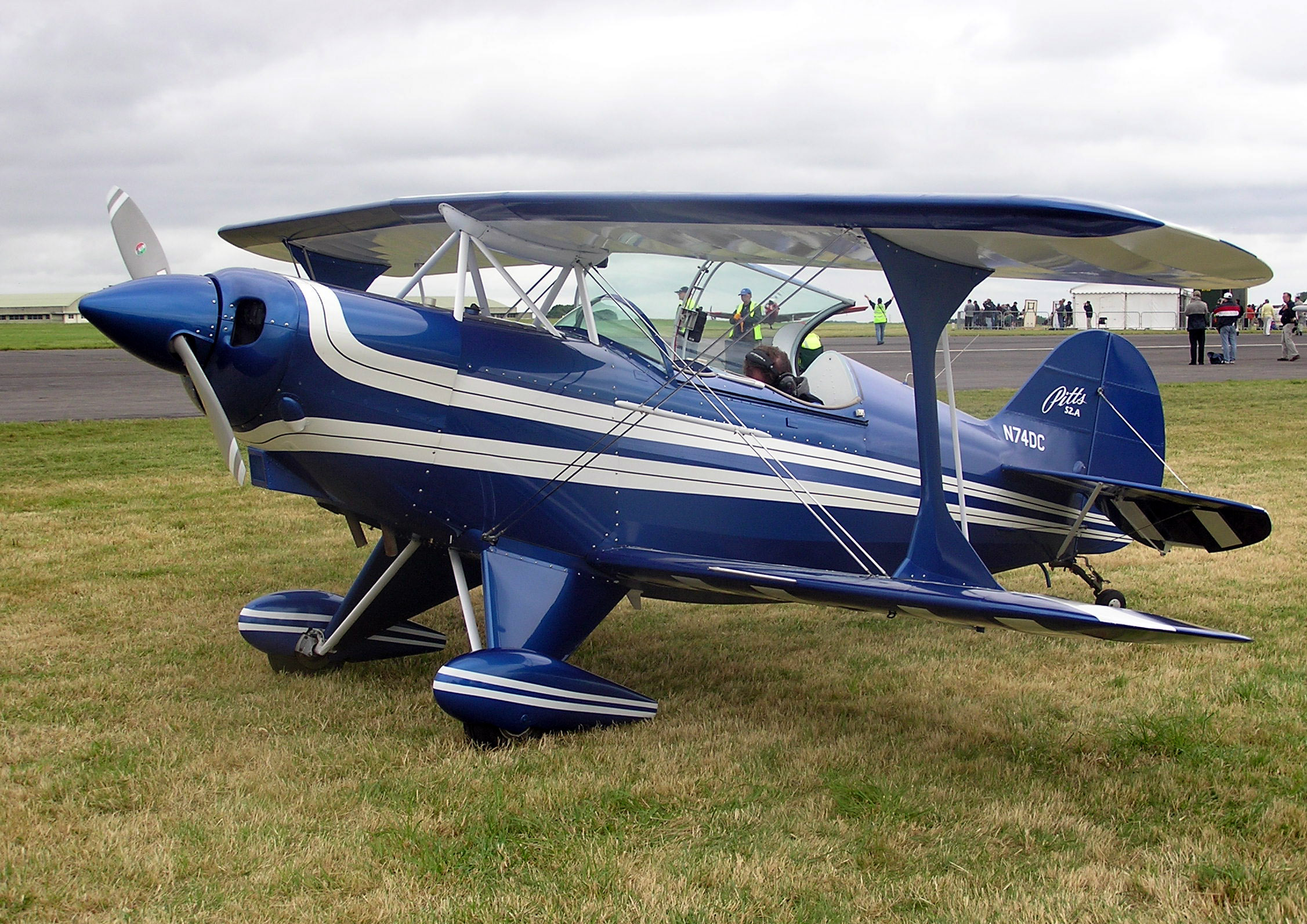
Pitts S-2A

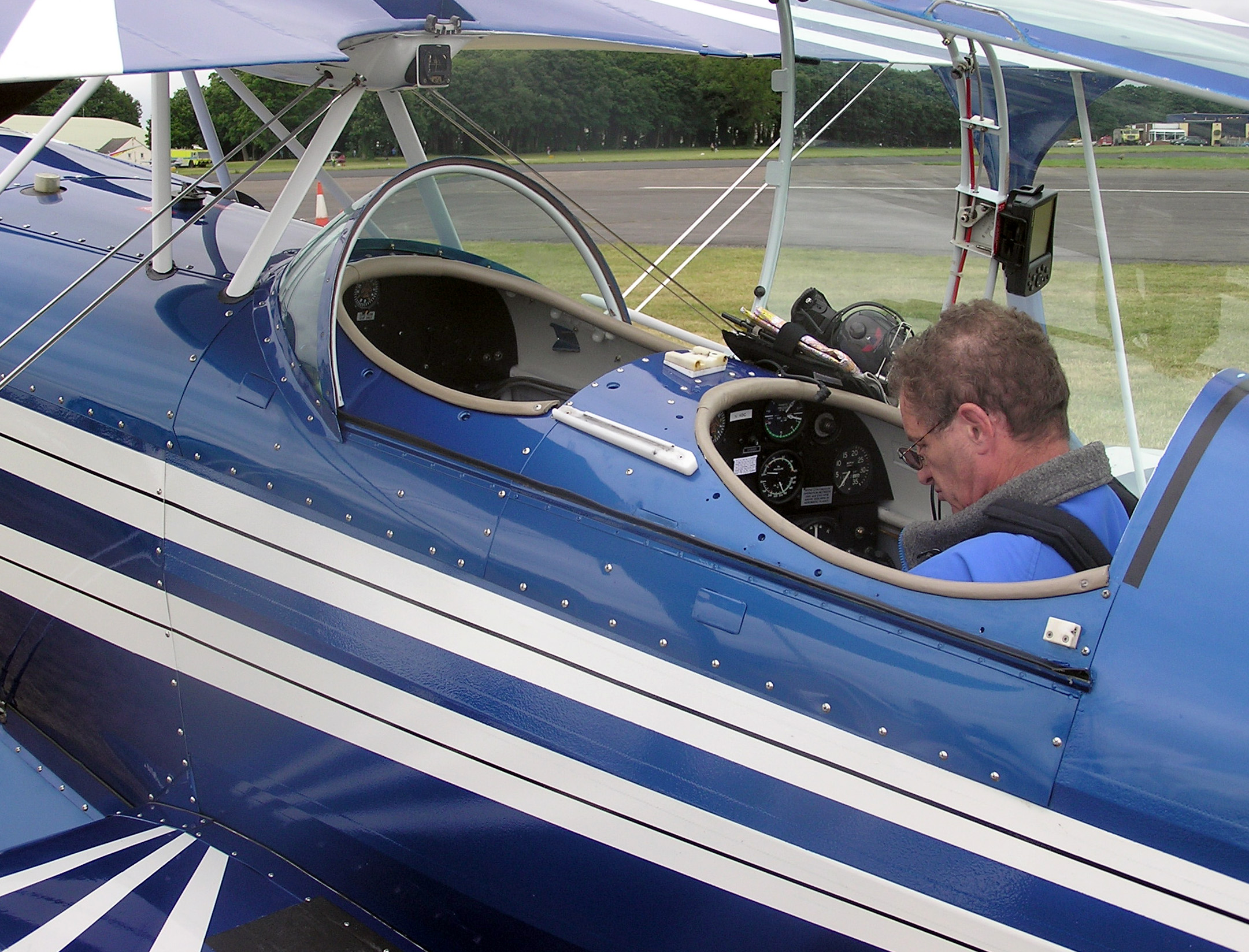
Cockpit of Pitts S-2A

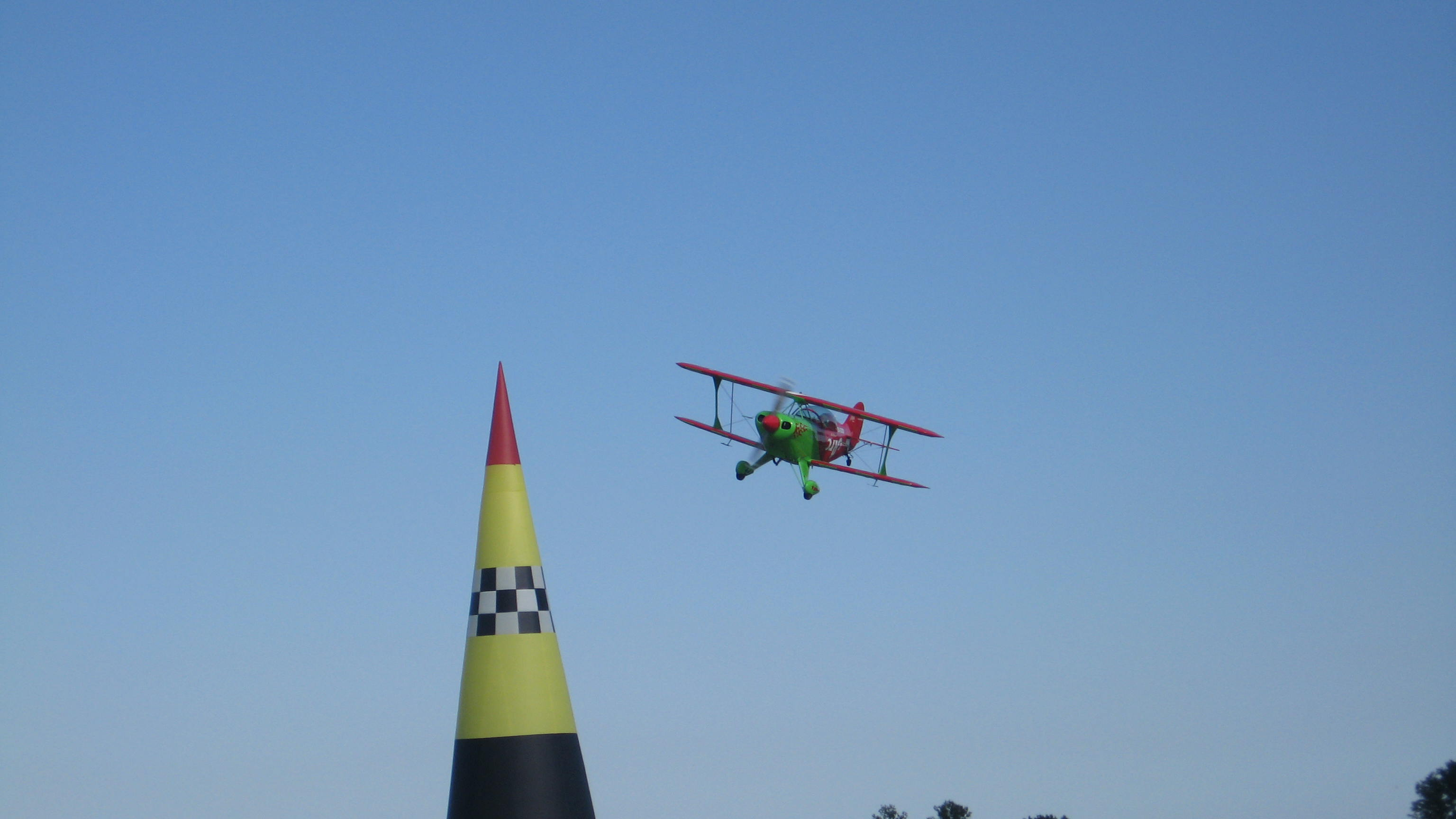
Pitts S-2B

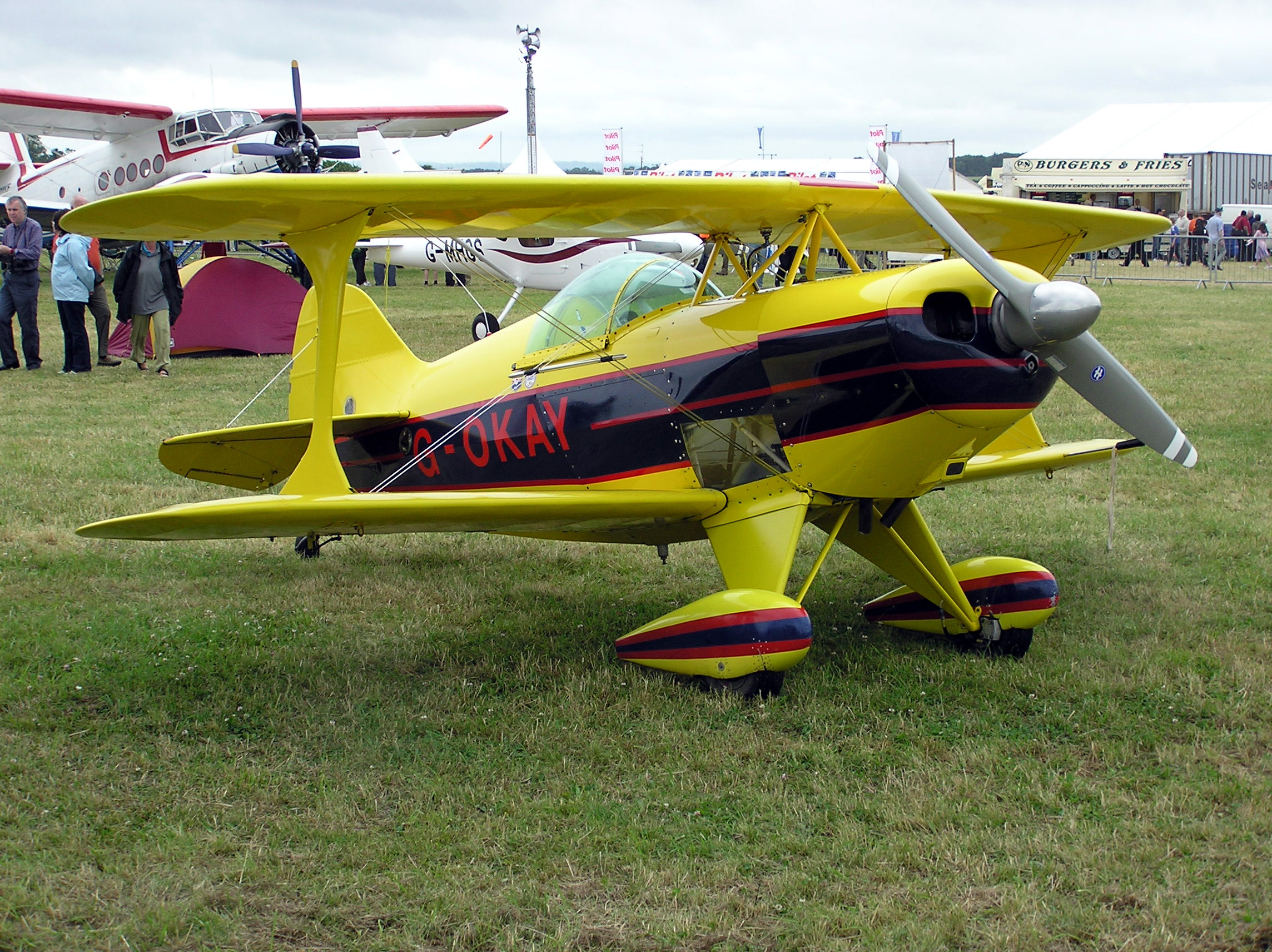
Pitts S-1E

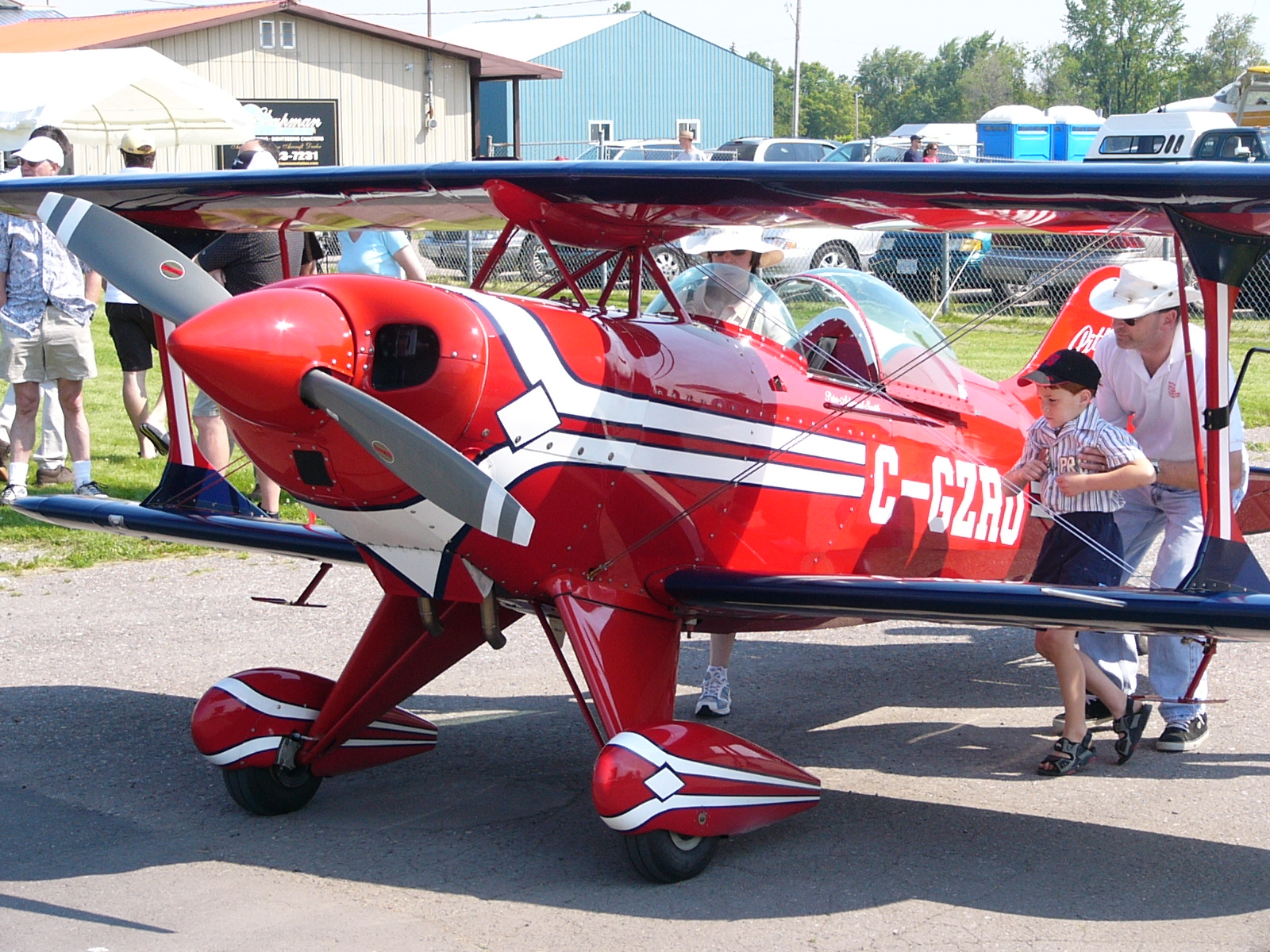
Pitts S-1T

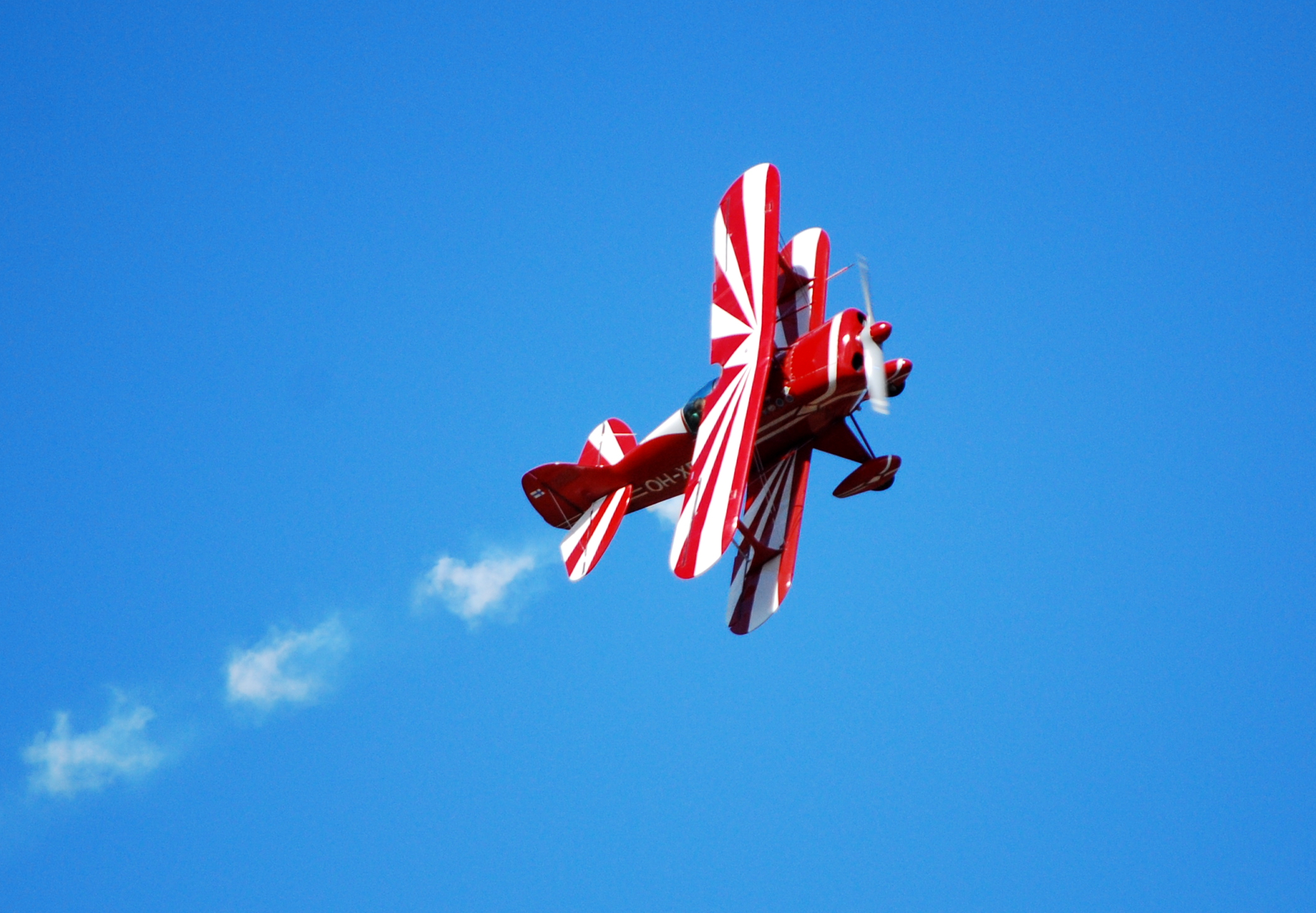
Pitts Special in flight

The Pitts Special (company designations S-1 and S-2) is a series of light aerobatic biplanes designed by Curtis Pitts. It has accumulated many competition wins since its first flight in 1944. The Pitts biplanes dominated world aerobatic competition in the 1960s and 1970s and, even today, remain potent competition aircraft in the lower categories.

== Design and development ==
Curtis Pitts began the design of a single-seat aerobatic biplane in 1943–1944. The design has been refined continuously since the prototype first flew in September 1944; however, the current Pitts S-2 still remains quite close to the original in concept and in design.

Several of the aircraft that Curtis Pitts built had a picture of a skunk on them and were called "Stinkers". After she bought it, aerobatic performer Betty Skelton called the second aircraft that Curtis built, "Little Stinker". The prototype S-2, which was the first two-seat Pitts, was "Big Stinker", the prototype Model 11 (later called S-1-11B) was "Super Stinker", and the prototype Model 12 was the "Macho Stinker".

In 1962 Curtis Pitts set up Pitts Enterprises to sell plans of the S-1C to homebuilders.

=== Current versions ===
Certified versions of the Pitts are now produced by Aviat Aircraft in Afton, Wyoming. It is available as the S-1 single-seater with an up to 200 hp (150 kW) flat-4 Lycoming engine and a 17 ft 4 in (5.28 m) wingspan, or as the S-2 two-seater variant featuring a 260 hp (194 kW) flat-6 Lycoming and a 20 ft (6.1 m) wingspan. Pitts Specials have been equipped with engines of up to 450 hp (338 kW).

Plans for the single-seat Pitts S-1S are also available from Aviat Aircraft. The S-1C and derivative S-1SS plans and kits are supplied by Steen Aero Lab in Palm Bay, Florida. Many hundreds of homebuilders have successfully completed and flown the Pitts since plans became available in 1960.

== Operational history ==
All single-seat (S-1) and two-seat (S-2) Pitts Specials are variations of the basic design from 1944.

The aircraft was popularized by Betty Skelton, Caro Bayley, and other air show performers, which led to the offering of plans in 1962.

Pitts produced limited numbers of aircraft during the 1940s and 1950s. The Pitts Special became the standard by which all other aerobatic aircraft were judged. After a number of homebuilt aircraft were produced from rough hand-drawn plans produced by Pitts, more professionally drawn plans went on sale in 1962. While many homebuilt aircraft were built in the 1960s, earning the S-1 a reputation as an excellent aerobatic aircraft, Pitts worked on the design of a two-seat aerobatic trainer version, the S-2, which first flew in 1967 and gained its type certificate in 1971. Factory-built aircraft produced by the Aerotek company at Afton, Wyoming were joined in production by the single-seat S-1S in 1973.

In 1972, the US Aerobatic Team won the World Championships flying only Pitts biplanes.

In 1977 Curtis Pitts sold his interests in the Pitts S-1 and S-2 to Doyle Child. Child later sold the rights in 1981 to Frank Christensen, who continued production at the Afton plant under the guise of Christen Industries. The rights for homebuilt versions of the Pitts were sold in 1994 to Steen Aero Lab, with the Afton factory and production rights being transferred to Aviat.

Curtis Pitts died in 2005 at age 89. At the time of his death, he was working with Steen on the prototype of the new Pitts Model 14, a brand new, two-seat biplane designed for unlimited aerobatics powered by the 400 horsepower Vedeneyev M14P radial engine. The rights to the Pitts name is currently owned by Aviat which also owns the similar model to the Pitts in the Christen Eagle.

The current inverted flat spin world record is 98 set on March 20, 2016 by air show performer Spencer Suderman over Yuma, Arizona. Suderman flew the Sunbird S-1x, a Lycoming IO-540-powered experimental variant of the Pitts S1. The maneuver began from 24,500' over the Yuma Proving Grounds and was recovered at 2,000' AGL. The previous world record for the number of consecutive turns in a flat spin was 81 also set by Spencer Suderman on March 13, 2014 in a Pitts S-2B from 23,000 ft altitude over the Naval Air Facility El Centro.

== Variants ==
S-1
Basic single-seat Pitts aerobatic biplane with a flat M6 aerofoil section and lower wing ailerons only, fitted with a variety of engines. Two were built, the first named Special and the second Li'l Stinker.
S-1C
Amateur-built S-1 single-seat aircraft, flat bottom wing with ailerons on lower wing only, designed for 100–180 hp (75–134 kW) engines. First flown in 1960, the S-1 is currently available as a plans-built aircraft from Steen Aero Lab.
S-1D
Amateur-built S-1C with ailerons on all four wings, generally similar to S-1S.
S-1E
Amateur-built S-1C using factory-produced kits. Uses symmetrical airfoil.
S-1S
Aerotek-built certified S-1C for competition aerobatics, round airfoil section, four ailerons, and powered by a 180 hp (134 kW) Lycoming AEIO-360-B4A; 61 built. This model is also available from Aviat Aircraft as a plans-built aircraft.
S-1SS
Similar to the certified S-1S "Roundwing". 180–200+ hp (134–149 kW), single-seat, homebuilt, symmetrical wing, four symmetrical "Super-Stinker" style ailerons, 300 degree/s roll rate, fixed-pitch propeller. This model is available in plans and components form from Steen Aero Lab.
S-1T
Aerotek-built S-1C with a 200 hp (149 kW) Lycoming AEIO-360-A1E and minor changes; 64 built. Four-aileron, single-seat, factory-built, symmetrical wing, symmetrical ailerons, constant speed two- or three-blade Hartzell propeller. The top wing was moved forward compared to the S-1S for weight and balance. This model was in production in 2008 from Aviat Aircraft as an "on-demand" manufacture product.
S-1-11B
Known as Model 11 "Super Stinker", 300+ hp (220 kW) Lycoming, four-aileron, single-seat, experimental-plans or factory-built and factory component parts, symmetrical airfoil, three-blade constant speed prop, rolls better than 300 degree/s, climbs better than 3,000 ft/min (15.3 m/s).
S-2
Scaled up S-1 with tandem two-seat fuselage and powered by a 200 hp (149 kW) Lycoming AEIO-360-B4A piston engine.
S-2A
Aerotek-built S-2A with a 200 hp (149 kW) Lycoming AEIO-360-A1A or -A1E piston engine, constant speed propeller, later builds have a longer landing gear and a 2-inch-wider (51 mm) front cockpit; 259 built.
S-2B
Aerotek-built S-2A with a 260 hp (194 kW) Lycoming AEIO-540-D4A5 engine, upper wing auxiliary fuel tank, the landing gear and upper wings were moved forward six inches; 196 built. The aircraft is out of production but is supported by Aviat Aircraft.
S-2C
Four aileron, two-seat, factory-built, symmetric airfoil, 260 hp (194 kW) Lycoming driving constant speed three-blade propeller, current production model. This was an evolution of the S-2B model, with improved ailerons and rudder, flat bottom fuselage, lower profile bungee gear, better inverted handling, and certified for +6 -5g. It is in production in 2008 by Aviat Aircraft.
S-2E
Amateur-built S-2A from factory-produced kits.
S-2S
Aerotek-built S-2B with a single cockpit and a twin tank fuel system. The fuselage is shortened by 14 inches (35 cm) forward of the cockpit to allow the installation of the heavier 260 hp (194 kW) Lycoming AEIO-540-D4A5. The wingspan is 20 ft, 0 inches (6.10 m); 17 built. This model is currently out of production, but supported by Aviat Aircraft.
S-2SE
Amateur-built S-2S from factory-produced kits.

== Operators ==
=== Military operators ===
- Chile (1980–1989)
- Jordan
  - Royal Jordanian Falcons aerobatic team (4 S-2As)
- Venezuela

=== Civil operators ===
- Goodyear Eagles Aerobatics Display Team – 4 X Aviat S-2B
- Pitts Specials Formation Aerobatic Team – 2 X S-2B

== Aircraft on display ==
Canada

- S-1C on static display at the Atlantic Canada Aviation Museum in Halifax, Nova Scotia.
- S-2A on static display at the Canada Aviation and Space Museum in Ottawa, Ontario.

Italy

- S-1T on static display at Volandia in Somma Lombardo, Varese.

United States

- S-1 on static display at the MAPS Air Museum in North Canton, Ohio.
- S-1C on static display at the Aerospace Museum of California in North Highlands, California.
- S-1C on static display at the Hiller Aviation Museum in San Carlos, California.
- S-1C on static display at the Pima Air & Space Museum in Tucson, Arizona.
- S-1C on static display at the Udvar-Hazy Center of the National Air and Space Museum in Chantilly, Virginia.
- S-1S on static display at the San Diego Air and Space Museum in San Diego, California.
- S-1S On static display at the Evergreen Aviation & Space Museum in McMinnville, Oregon.
- S-2 on static display at the EAA Aviation Museum in Oshkosh, Wisconsin.
- S-2B on static display at the Frontiers of Flight Museum in Dallas, Texas.
- On static display at the Virginia Air & Space Center in Hampton, Virginia.
- On static display at the Wings Over the Rockies Air and Space Museum in Denver, Colorado.

== Specifications ==
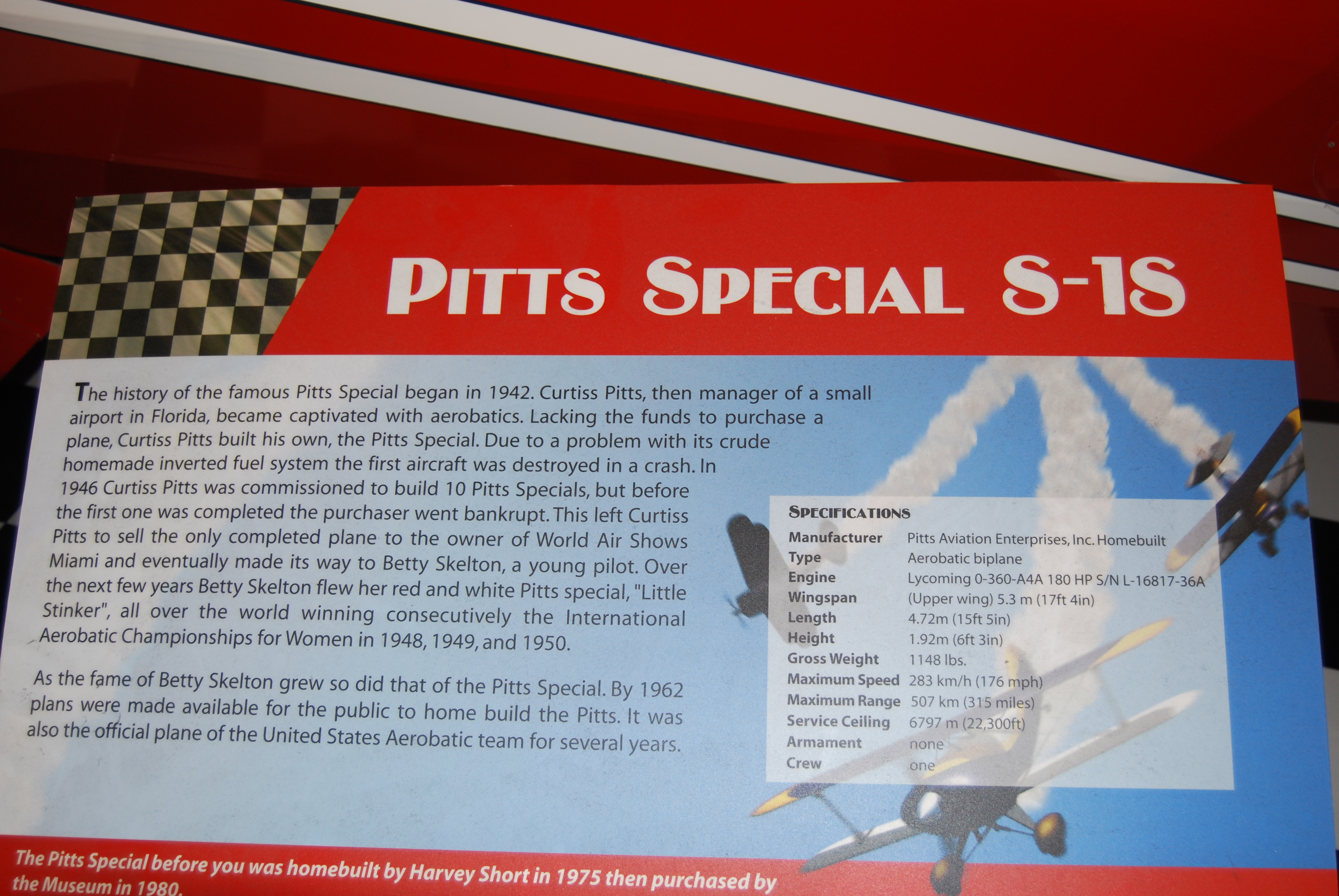
Pitts S-1S museum information desk

=== Pitts S-1S ===
Data from National Air and Space Museum; Plane & Pilot Magazine

General characteristics

- Crew: one
- Length: 15 ft 6 in (4.7 m)
- Upper wingspan: 17 ft 4 in (5.3 m)
- Height: 5 ft 6 in (1.6 m)
- Wing area: 125.0 sq ft (11.61 m^{2})
- Empty weight: 710–720 lb (326 kg)
- Gross weight: 1,100–1,950 lb (499 kg)
- Fuel capacity: 19 US gal (16 imp gal; 72 L)
- Powerplant: 1 × Lycoming IO-360-B4A air-cooled four-cylinder engine, 180–200 hp (130–150 kW)

Performance

- Maximum speed: 136 kn (156 mph, 251 km/h)
- Cruise speed: 120 kn (140 mph, 230 km/h) (max. cruise)
- Stall speed: 50 kn (57 mph, 92 km/h)
- Range: 350 nmi (400 mi, 650 km)
- Rate of climb: 2,600 ft/min (13 m/s)

=== Pitts S-2B ===
Data from Jane's All the World's Aircraft 1988–89

General characteristics

- Crew: one
- Capacity: one passenger
- Length: 18 ft 9 in (5.72 m)
- Upper wingspan: 20 ft 0 in (6.10 m)
- Lower wingspan: 19 ft 0 in (5.79 m)
- Height: 6 ft 7 1/2 in (2.019 m)
- Wing area: 125.0 sq ft (11.61 m^{2})
- Empty weight: 1,150 lb (522 kg)
- Max takeoff weight: 1,625 lb (737 kg)
- Fuel capacity: 29 US gal (24 imp gal; 110 L)
- Powerplant: 1 × Textron Lycoming AEIO-540-D4A5 air-cooled flat-six engine, 260 hp (190 kW)

Performance

- Cruise speed: 152 kn (175 mph, 282 km/h) (max. cruise)
- Stall speed: 52 kn (60 mph, 96 km/h)
- Never exceed speed: 182 kn (209 mph, 337 km/h)
- Range: 277 nmi (319 mi, 513 km) (55% power)
- Service ceiling: 21,000 ft (6,400 m)
- Rate of climb: 2,700 ft/min (14 m/s)

== See also ==
Related development

- Pitts Samson
- Pitts Model 12
- Vancil Spitz S1, an ultralight S-1 replica
- Gorobets, a modified fullmetal S-1 replica, powered by Walter Minor М332A

Aircraft of comparable role, configuration, and era

- Acro Sport II
- Sorrell Hiperbipe
- Steen Skybolt
- Aviat Eagle II (Christen Eagle)
