= Curtis Pitts =

American aircraft designer and builder (1915–2005)

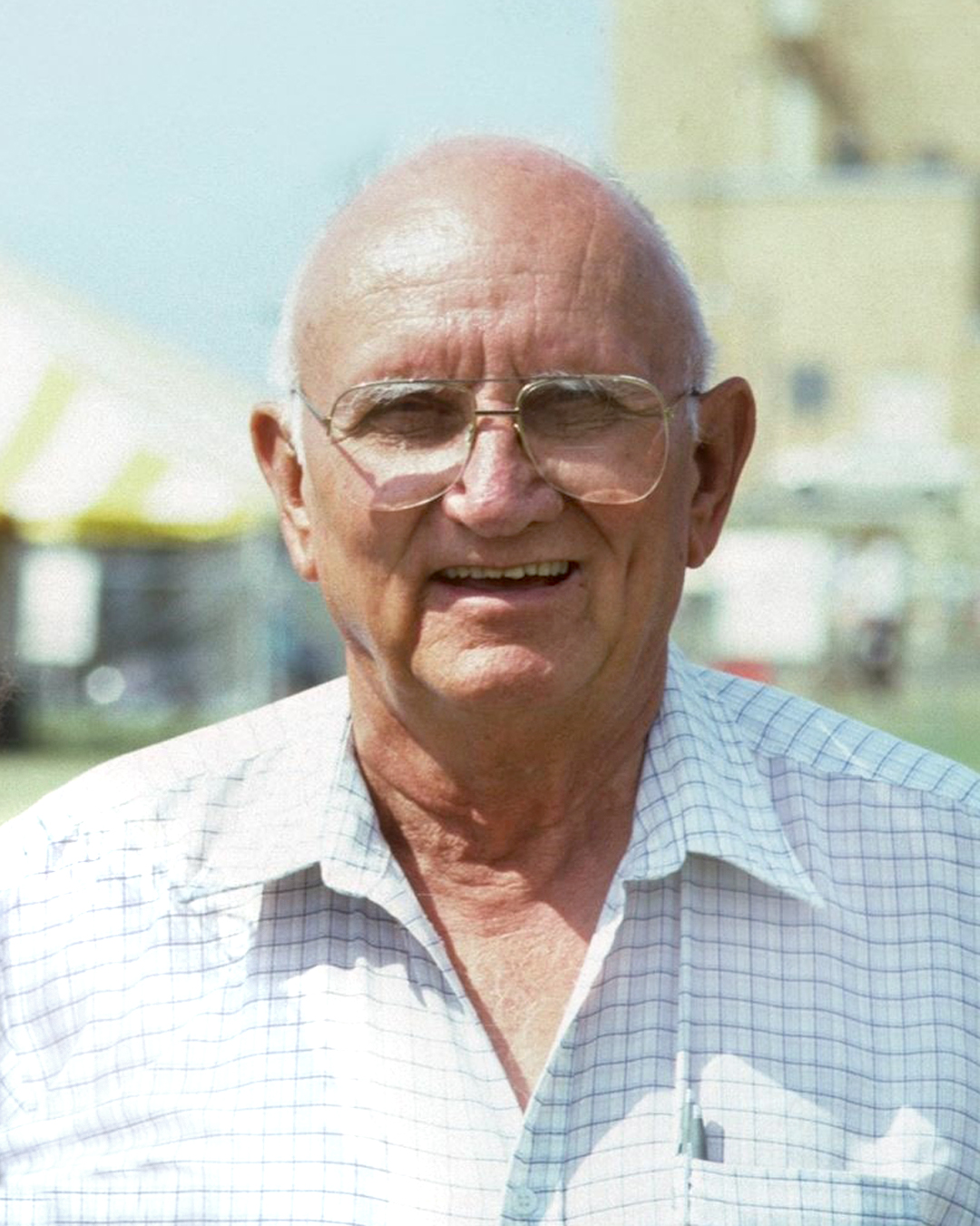
- Pitts, c. 1996
- Born: Curtis Hardeman Pitts; December 9, 1915; Stillmore, Georgia, U.S.
- Died: June 10, 2005 (aged 89); Homestead, Florida, U.S.
- Spouse: Willie Mae Lord
- Children: 2

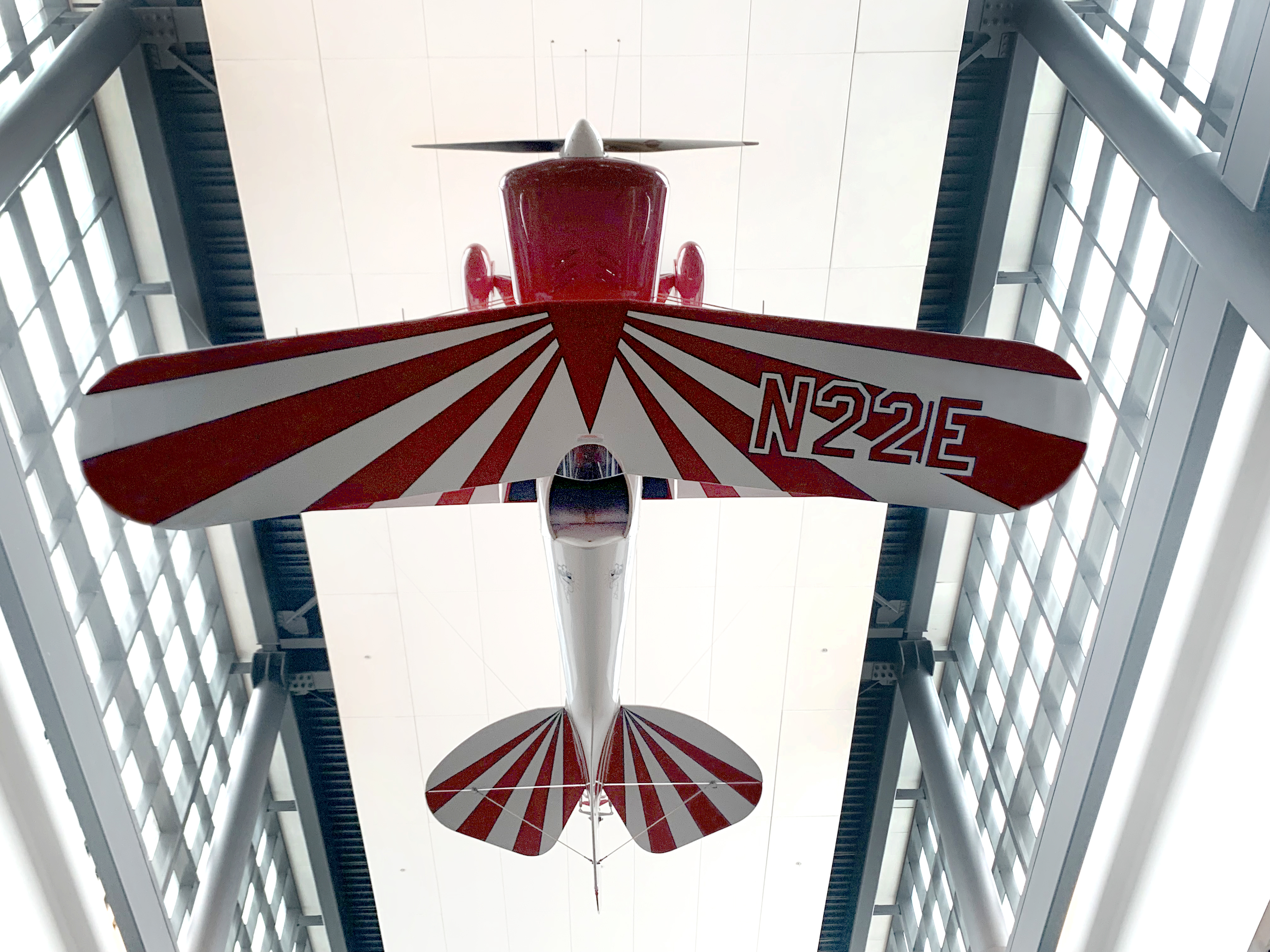
Betty Skelton's "Little Stinker", Pitts Special #2, hanging in the Smithsonian.

Curtis Hardeman Pitts (December 9, 1915 – June 10, 2005) was an American aircraft designer, aircraft manufacturer, crop duster, and airport fixed-base operator. He became widely known and revered in the aerobatics community for his design of the Pitts Special, a series of highly aerobatic biplanes. Pitts Specials dominated aerobatic competition from the 1960's to the 1970's. Though later outclassed by newer monoplane designs, Pitts Specials remain popular as sport airplanes for their excellent flying qualities. The Smithsonian Institution's National Air and Space Museum in Washington, DC has called Curtis Pitts' design "revolutionary because of its small size, light weight, short wingspan and extreme agility".

== Early life ==
Curtis was born in Stillmore, Georgia in 1915 and lost both his parents while growing up, losing his mother at age 9 and his father at age 17. He grew up in Americus, Georgia. Pitts was fascinated with flying as a child and spent much of his free time at the local airfield, watching airplanes and dreaming. He designed and built his first aircraft while still in high school, a Parasol wing craft with a modified automobile engine, but Curtis crashed it during taxi tests. In 1933 he found work as a railroad carpenter in Ocala, Florida and began taking flying lessons.

Settling in Jacksonville, Florida, Curtis met and married Willie Mae Lord. In 1940 he took at job at Naval Air Station Jacksonville as a Naval repair depot aircraft inspector. Curtis continued flying in his spare time, as much as money would allow. Interested in aerobatics, he managed to purchase a Waco F series biplane, but found the performance of the heavy airplane to be dismal, especially in regards to available power vs. weight. Realizing there were no aircraft within his budget capable of the maneuverability he had in mind, he decided to design and build his own airplane.

== Designing the prototype Pitts Special S-1, N52650 ==
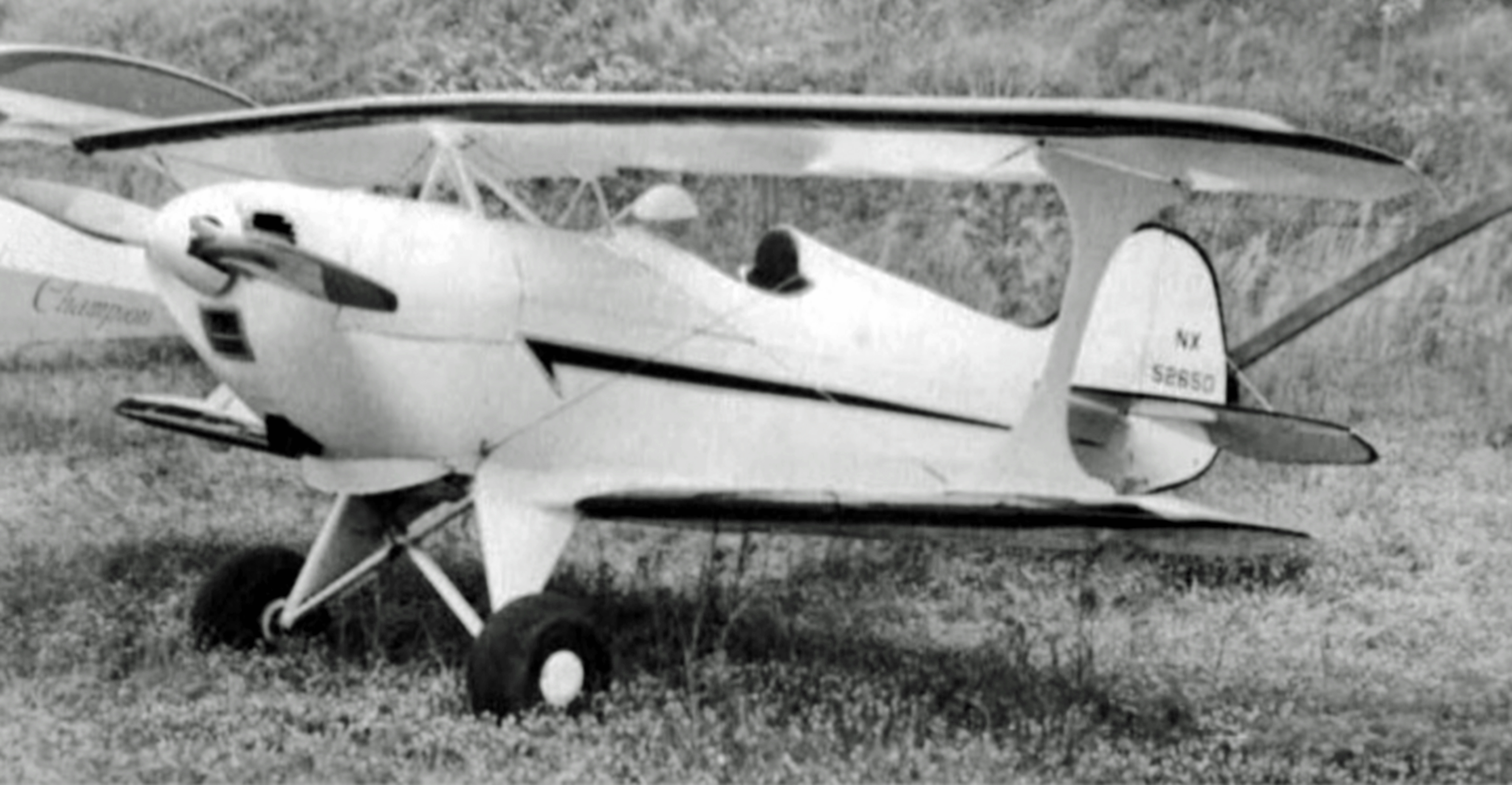
The first Pitts Special S-1, N52650, circa 1945.

Pitts visualized something extremely compact and lightweight, with the inherent strength of a biplane, powered by a small and affordable power plant. The result was the first Pitts Special, a tiny single seat biplane that was simple, cheap to build, and incredibly agile. Engineers at the Naval repair depot helped with some elements of the design, but the bulk of it came purely from Curtis' talented mind. He had an uncanny natural sense for aerodynamics and engineering, and despite a limited formal education (high school and an engineering correspondence course), he succeeded beyond his wildest expectations. He later recalled, "When you don't know any better, you can do a lot of things...".

Curtis shared the project with a friend at the Naval repair depot, Phil Quigley, and the two men devoted all their spare hours over several months turning raw materials into an airplane. They finished in the summer of 1945. Carrying registration N52650, Curtis served as test pilot, taking the prototype into the air for its first flight on August 28, 1945. The minuscule airplane had a wingspan just under 17 feet and an empty weight of about 500 lbs. Limited by a 55 hp Lycoming engine, it still delivered exceptional performance, exactly what Curtis had originally hoped.

The small Lycoming soon gave way to a 90 hp Franklin engine. Curtis experimented with his own home-brewed inverted fuel system on the Franklin with mixed results. Both Curtis and Phil Quigley enjoyed flying the prototype Pitts Special over the next four months, putting 40 hours on it. Local Jacksonville pilots took notice and Curtis recalled, "Everybody was kind of in awe of it...it was a little bitty airplane and they just couldn't believe it could do the things that I was doing".

Curtis had borrowed money to buy the Franklin motor, however, and by the end of 1945, the lender wanted payment. He subsequently sold N52650 to a local agricultural pilot for $2,000. The new owner crashed the airplane a few days later after fuel starving the engine while flying inverted. Fortunately, he walked away from the accident, but the airplane was destroyed.

After the loss of the prototype Pitts Special, Carl Stengel of Stengel's Flying Service in Gainesville convinced Curtis to relocate his family from Jacksonville. Stengel planned to finance the building of 10 more Pitts Specials at his facility and Curtis began building a new airplane. However, the financing fell through and only one incomplete aircraft emerged from the deal. Curtis bought out Stengel's crop dusting and FBO operation in the spring of 1947 and worked to complete Pitts Special #2, carrying registration NX86401.

== Early fame: The second Pitts Special, "Little Stinker" ==
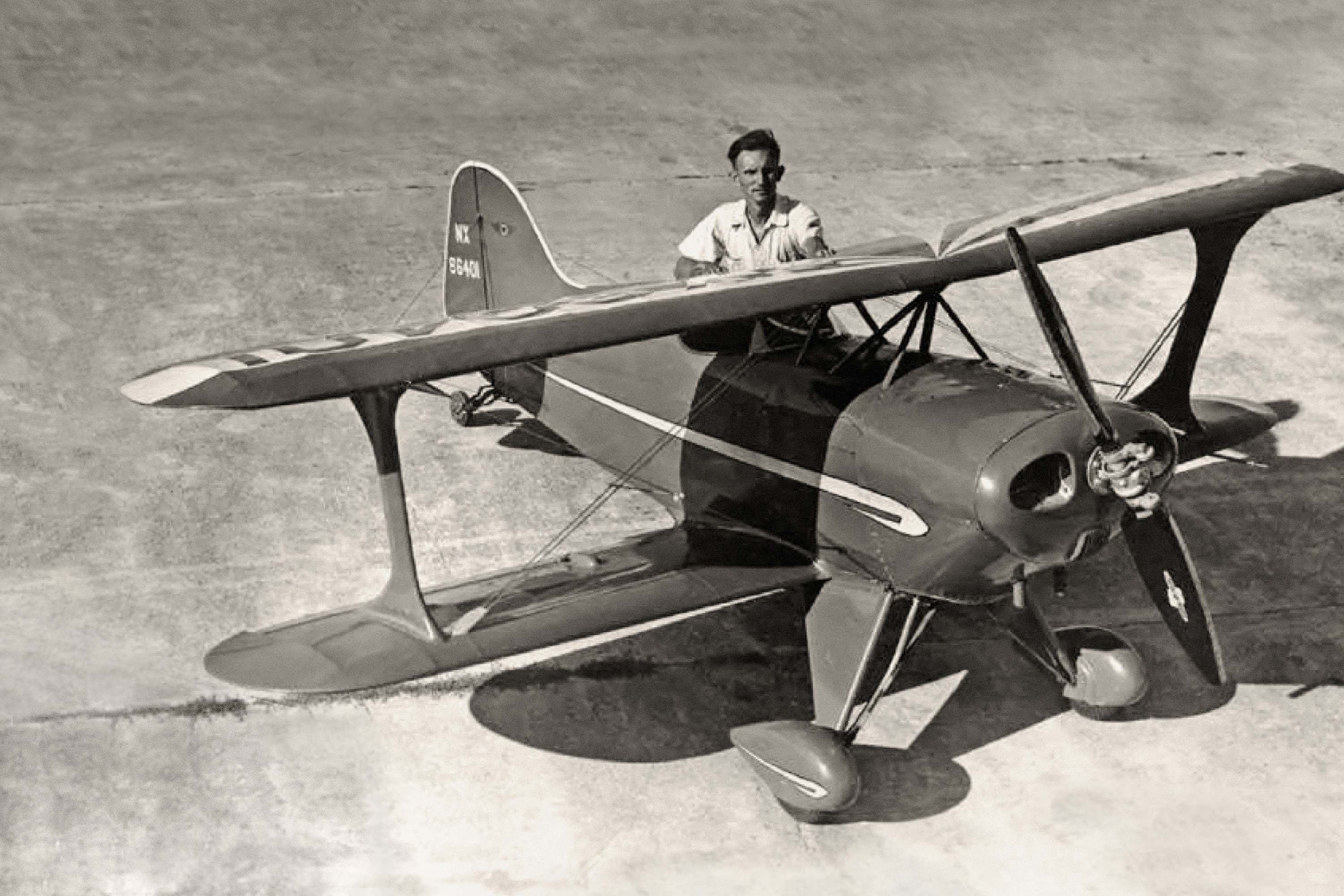
Curtis H. Pitts posing with the second Pitts Special. This airplane later became famous as Betty Skelton's "Little Stinker".

Completed at Gainesville, the second Pitts Special S-1 sported several improvements over the lost prototype, including a 90 hp Continental, a longer fuselage, and a working inverted fuel system. Phil Quigley began flying the airplane in airshows and caused a minor sensation in the latter half of 1947 as nothing like the Pitts Special had ever been seen. The airplane appeared on the cover of "Skyways" magazine in December 1947 and interest in the Pitts Special spread nationwide.

In 1948 Curtis sold the airplane to airshow pilot and promoter Jess Bristow. Bristow hired Phil Quigley to continue flying the Pitts Special that summer, and one of Bristow's other airshow pilots, Betty Skelton, was so impressed with the airplane she decided to buy it without even test flying it first. She paid Bristow $3,000 for the airplane in August 1948.

Betty re-registered NX86401 as N22E in 1949 and christened it "Little Stinker", winning competitions and performing in air shows between 1949 and 1951. She crated the airplane and took it to England and Ireland, where she flew in the Royal Air Derby and created international interest in the design. Betty retired from performing in 1951 and sold N22E, but she later reacquired the airplane and donated it to the Smithsonian. "Little Stinker", Pitts Special #2/N22E, hangs today in the Udvar-Hazy annex of the Smithsonian National Air and Space Museum.

== "Samson", the Big Pitts ==
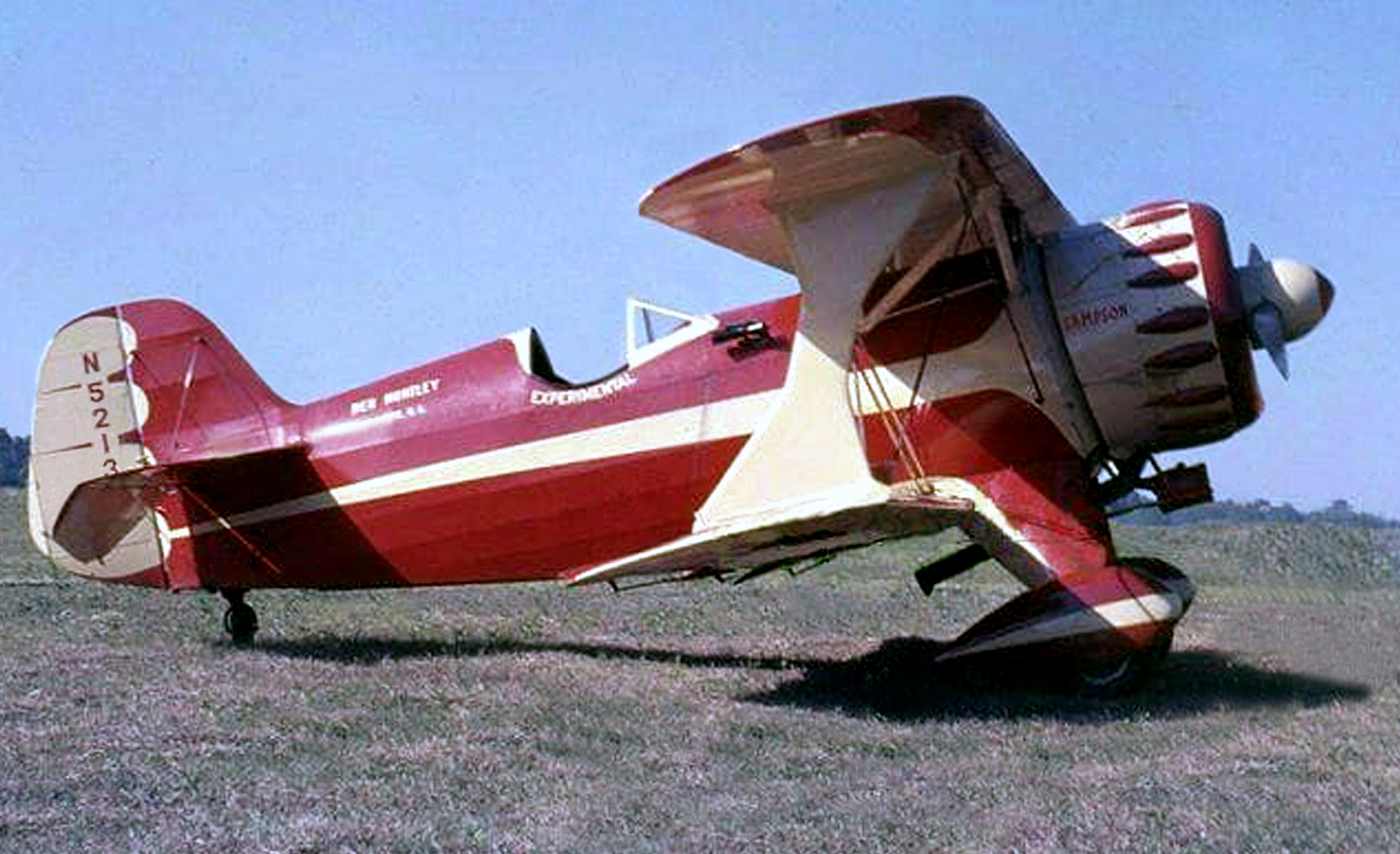
Pitts "Samson", a high-performance airshow biplane designed and built by Curtis Pitts in 1949.

In late 1948 airshow promoter Jess Bristow came to Curtis with the idea of marrying a 450 hp Pratt and Whitney 985 radial engine to a scaled up Pitts Special design. In response, Curtis designed and built the Pitts Samson, a 2,200 lb biplane with a 24-foot wingspan that thrilled airshow crowds for several years in the 1950's. Samson was destroyed in a mid-air collision but the pilot survived. In the early 1980s airshow pilot and builder Steve Wolf recreated "Samson" with Curtis' assistance and flew it for several years.

== The third Pitts S-1: Caro Bayley's "Black Magic" ==
In 1949 airshow performer and WASP pilot Caro Bayley had the opportunity to fly "Little Stinker" and persuaded Curtis to build her a similar airplane. The third Pitts Special S-1, carrying registration N8M, was completed in 1950 in Gainesville. It was powered by a 125HP Lycoming O290 and Bayley nicknamed the airplane "Black Magic". She won the Women's Aerobatic Championship in 1951 but quit performing after marrying later that year. N8M languished until being sold in 1953. It was later destroyed in a fire. An accurate replica of "Black Magic" was built by engineer Ted L. Teach of New Carlisle, Ohio over 30 years and successfully flew in 1999.

== Monoplane racers ==
In the late 1940s, Curtis became interested in monoplane midget racing, so he designed and built the "Pitts Pellet". The aircraft crashed in the spring of 1949 after the pilot encountered a high-speed stall in the propwash of another aircraft. Curtis completed a second midget racer, "Lil Monster", which raced into the early 1950s, but he never built another monoplane race aircraft. Lil Monster survives to the present day.

== The 1950s: a change in priorities ==
For most of the 1950s Curtis did not build any further aircraft and instead re-focused his efforts on running his airport FBO, a crop dusting business ("Pitts' Aero Service"), and raising his family. In 1955 he moved his operation (and family) south to a grass strip near Homestead, Florida and, for a time, thought his Pitts Special days lay behind him.

However, the excitement of what he had created would not die out. Other motivated home builders began putting together their own versions of the Pitts Special S-1, examining "Little Stinker" and dropping in on Curtis for advice and rudimentary plans. Dean Case's airplane, N11JC, "Joy's Toy" was completed in 1960 and among the first Pitts-inspired airplanes not built by Curtis. Dean went on to build five more Pitts Specials. Jim Meek, one of Curtis' duster pilots, completed N37J "Mr. Muscles" in late 1959 while working at Pitts' Aero Service in Homestead, no doubt with the help of Curtis and Phil Quigley. Mr Muscles was the first Pitts Special to use a high horsepower 170 HP Lycoming.

"Pitts Special" home builders in the 1950s had to be highly creative as they had little more than shop plan sketches to use as a reference. People began to pressure Curtis to release detailed plans for his Pitts Special and he finally relented in 1961.

== Pat Ledford's N8L and the first S-1C plans set ==
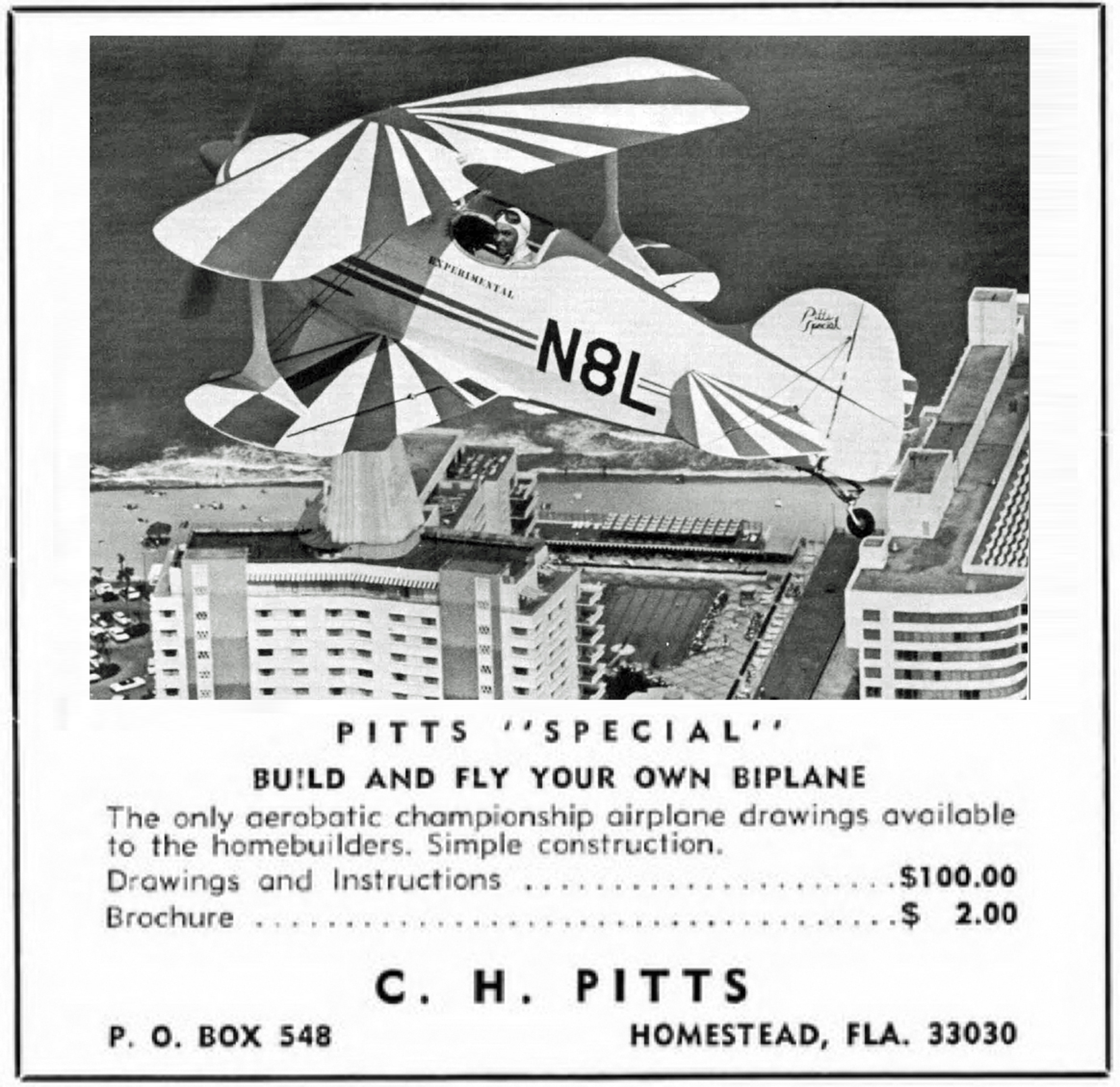
A mid-1960s Pitts Aviation Enterprises advertisement with Phil Quigley at the controls.

Working with builder Pat Ledford, Curtis and Phil Quigley built a new Pitts Special S-1 and used the process to create detailed, professionally drafted plans. They began with a Continental C-90/Continental O-200 engine and named the new Pitts model the "S-1C", with the "C" standing for "Continental". However, as the airplane came together they changed their minds and went with a more powerful Lycoming O-290. Despite the engine change, they kept the model name S-1C. The completed airplane carried registration N8L and it still survives to the present day. Slightly bigger than the earlier airplanes, N8L had an empty weight near 700 lbs. The wings utilized an M6 "flat bottom" airfoil and a pair of ailerons on the lower wings. After N8L's completion, Phil flew it extensively in airshows, reminding people of the airplane's capabilities. Photos of the airplane appeared in aviation magazine advertisements selling Pitts Special plans and new orders came in rapidly. The 17 sheet plans set originally cost $100.

== The 1960's: the Pitts Special revolution ==
Curtis' S-1C plans were a massive success. Home builders immediately began building their own Pitts Specials and plans built S-1C's soon dominated aerobatic competition. In 1966 Bob Herendeen became USA Aerobatic National Champion flying an S-1C built by Richard Rice of Tennessee. That same year Bob and the USA Aerobatic Team flew the aircraft in the World Aerobatic Championships. The popularity of the Pitts Special skyrocketed as a result and it became the premier aerobatic competition airplane of the day.

With single-seat plans selling well, Curtis moved on to tackle the next challenge, a two-seat version of the Pitts Special. Scaling up the same basic design of the S-1, he came up with the S-2, powered by a 180 hp Lycoming. The prototype S-2, registration N22Q, was ready by the summer of 1966 and Curtis again served as the first test pilot on July 7 of that year. Dubbed the "Big Stinker", Curtis flew the S-2 to that summer's Experimental Aircraft Association fly-in at Rockford, IL. Recognizing the commercial appeal of the two-seat airplane, Curtis began pursuing FAA Type certificate of the design such that he could manufacture and sell completed airplanes. N22Q now resides at the EAA Aviation Museum in Oshkosh, WI.

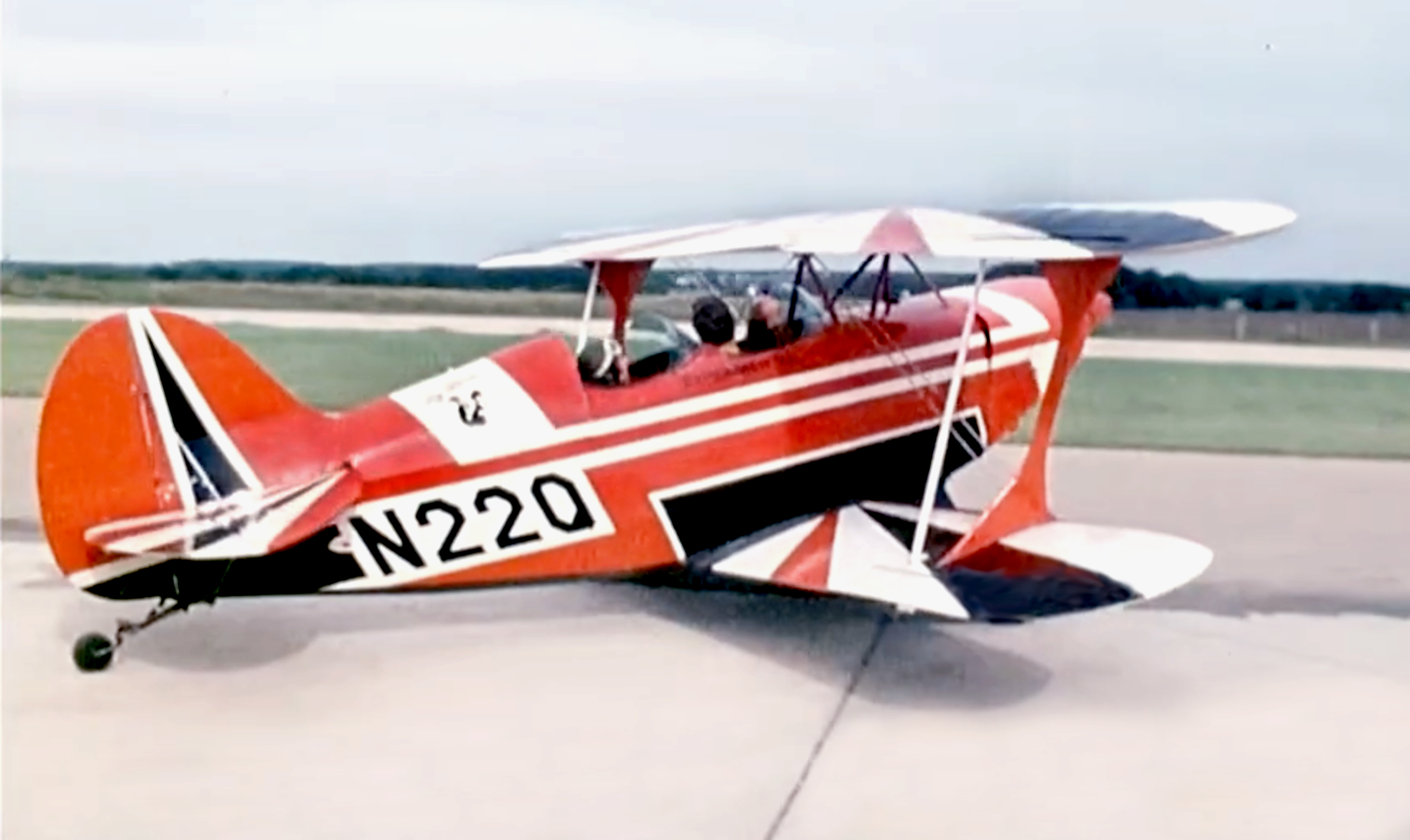
The prototype two-seat Pitts Special S-2, N22Q, taken about 1970.

Curtis sold his crop dusting business in the late '60s and dedicated himself to designing and producing aircraft, forming the company "Pitts Aviation Enterprises". In the summer of 1967 he set up shop on a grass airstrip at 21155 SW 320th St., still in Homestead, where he remained for the rest of his life. He initially sold S-1C plans and provided certain specialty parts to builders by request, inviting them to reach out by phone or visit anytime for help completing their projects.

He began experimenting with symmetrical airfoil wing designs in the mid-'60s, hoping to improve inverted flight characteristics. Enlisting Pat Ledford's N8L to serve as a test bed, the initial effort almost cost Curtis his life during spin testing. He remembered, "The first wings had a sharp leading edge and a sneaky stall...just happened without warning. I was out one day and got into a spin, so I recovered, started to pull up, and I was in a spin again. By the time I got things sorted out and was able to straighten it out, I got pretty low. When I came around the bottom on recovery I could have counted the blades of grass on the ground. It was close." After that experience, Curtis reportedly removed the wings from N8L and took a saw to them. He persevered, however, and soon had a working design. He began building an updated S-1 with the new symmetric wings.

In 1969 three airshow performers, Gene Soucy, Marion Cole, and Bob Heuer, formed a Pitts aerobatic team known as the "Red Devils". The team continued into the 1970s with Tom Poberezny and Charlie Hillard joining Gene Soucy after Cole and Heuer left.

== The 1970's: the Pitts Special golden era ==
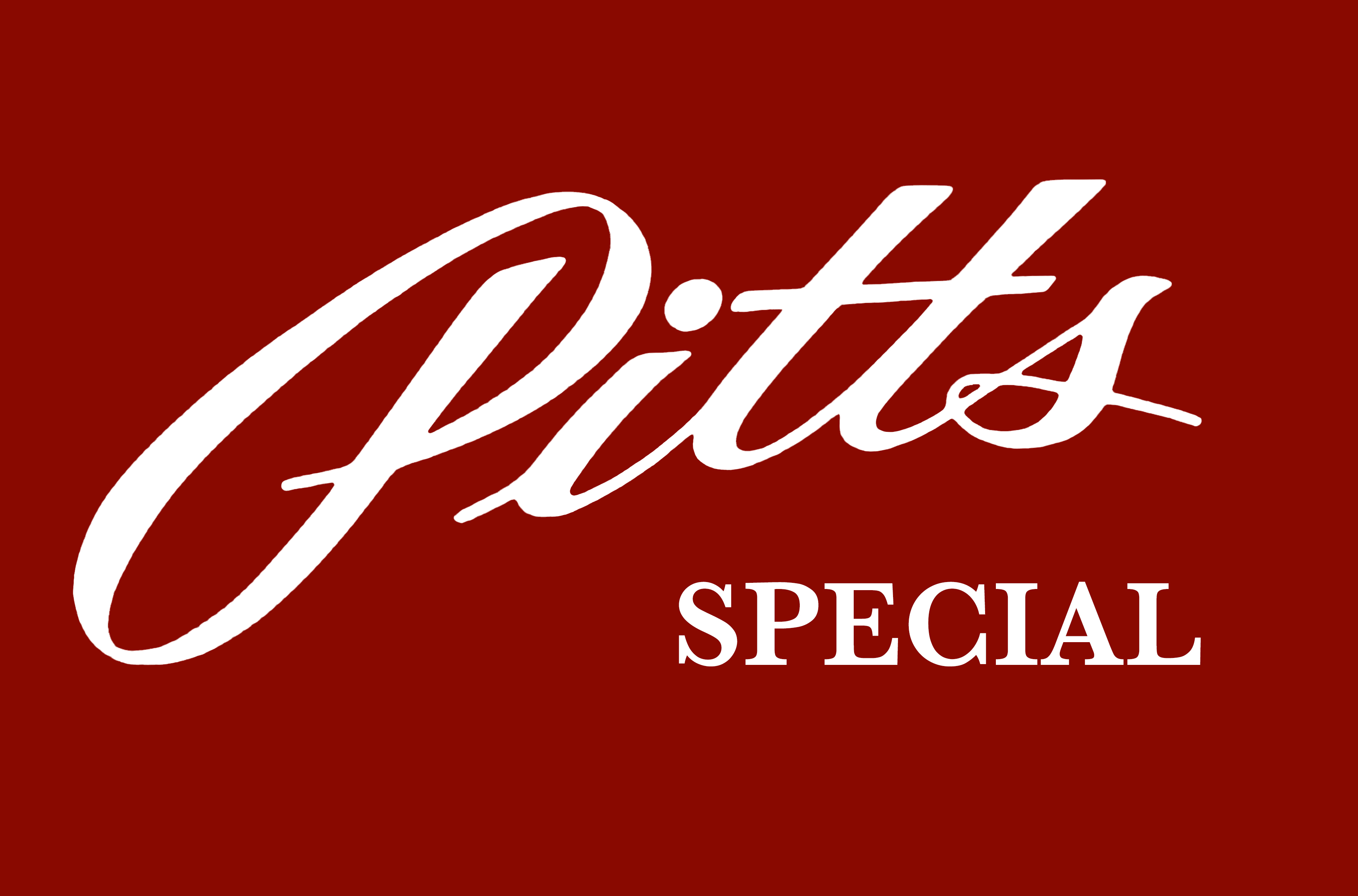
The Pitts Special logo, commonly painted on the vertical tail of Pitts aircraft.

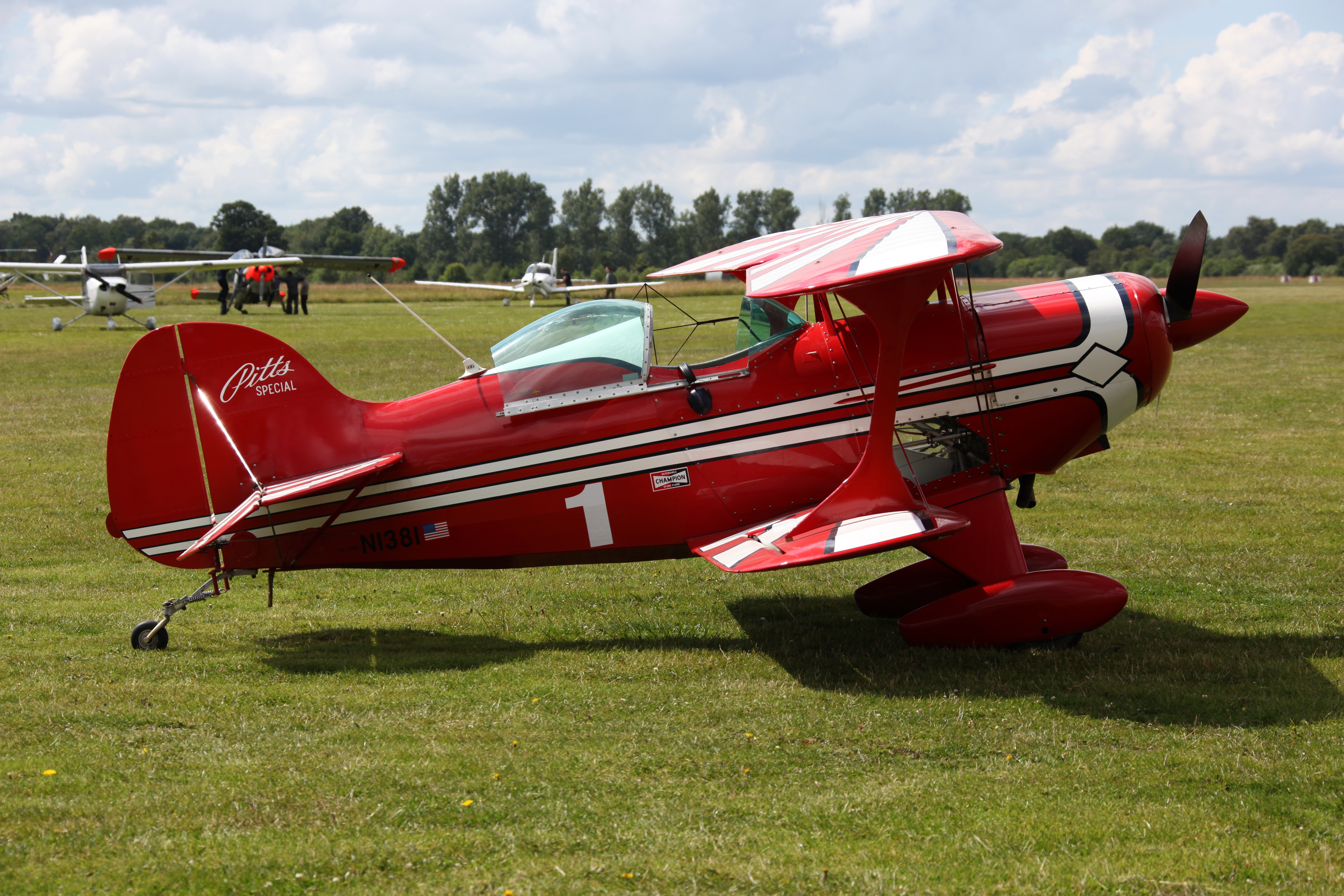
Pitts Special S-1C, an experimental/amateur built aircraft designed by Curtis Pitts. Photo by Heinrich Pniok

As the 1970s began Curtis completed his redesigned S-1 with four ailerons and symmetrical airfoils. This airplane became the S-1S, "S" standing for "symmetrical". The symmetrical airfoil and configuration of the S-1S wings was a great success and innovative enough that Curtis was awarded US Patent #3,695,557 for his design.

Work on the S-2 continued with an upgraded 200 hp Lycoming engine and a constant-speed propeller, dubbed the S-2A.

Pitts Aviation Enterprises began turning out kit versions of the S-1 while continuing to sell S-1C "flat wing" (non-symmetrical airfoil) plans. The FAA granted certification to the S-1S and Curtis began building and selling completed airplanes at a slow rate.

In October 1970 Curtis learned that an aircraft factory with a skilled local workforce was vacant in Afton, Wyoming. Herb Anderson, the owner of Aerotek in Afton, convinced him to license production of Pitts aircraft to Aerotek. Curtis retained the rights to the designs as well as responsibilities for engineering support and marketing. The type certificate for the S-2A was finally issued in the spring of 1971 and the factory in Afton began building the first airplane, an S-2A.

The first production S-2A completed at Afton, N14CB, went to airshow performer Marion Cole. Airshow great Art Scholl bought another early S-2A, N13AS, and adapted the airplane to cover the front cockpit and add a single-seat bubble canopy to the rear. S-1S production soon moved to Afton as well. Curtis and Doyle Child subsequently bought Aerotek from Herb and they operated it as a partnership.

The 1972 USA Aerobatics Team won the FAI World Aerobatic Championships flying the S-1S exclusively. Experimental/amateur built model S-1S aircraft began appearing in large numbers in the early 1970's, but most had home brew wings as Curtis did not initially release plans for them. The factory in Afton cranked out complete certified S-1S aircraft alongside S-2A's, building four aircraft per month (2 of each design). Eventually, kits and plans for both Pitts Special types were released as models S-1E and S-2E, with the "E" to designate them as experimental/amateur built. The S-1S became the gold standard aerobatic competition aircraft of the 1970's.

Always interested in improving the design, Curtis came up with an updated S-1 in the mid-1970s, the S-1T. This aircraft was designed around a 200 hp angle valve Lycoming motor, changing the shape of the firewall and reversing the angle of the Cabane struts, among other small changes. The prototype S-1T, N22XP, still exists at the Pitts Flying Museum in Queen Creek, AZ (along with N8L, N14CB, and other historic Pitts artifacts).

== Exit from manufacturing and continued influence ==
By early 1977 Curtis tired of the business and sold off his interest in both Pitts Aviation Enterprises and Aerotek to Doyle Child. Over the years the Pitts designs have passed through several different hands and the aircraft underwent subtle updates, including a 260 hp two seater, the S-2B. Aviat Aircraft Inc. of Afton, Wyoming currently produces certified models of the S-2C and S-1T, as well as S-1S plans sets. Steen Aero Lab of Palm Bay, Florida owns the rights to the S-1C design and sells plans for that aircraft.

Despite his semi-retirement, Curtis remained an integral part of the aerobatics community and continued to produce new designs, including the S-1-11B "Super Stinker" and the Pitts Model 12 "Macho Stinker" in the late 1990s. Curtis designed the Model 12 around the Russian M14P/PF radial engine and the design is now owned by Don Adamson of 92nd West Aviation, Inc, Lonoke, Arkansas. 92nd West produces Model 12 plans sets, kits, and completed aircraft on order.

== Later years: Designer emeritus, "Pa Pitts" ==
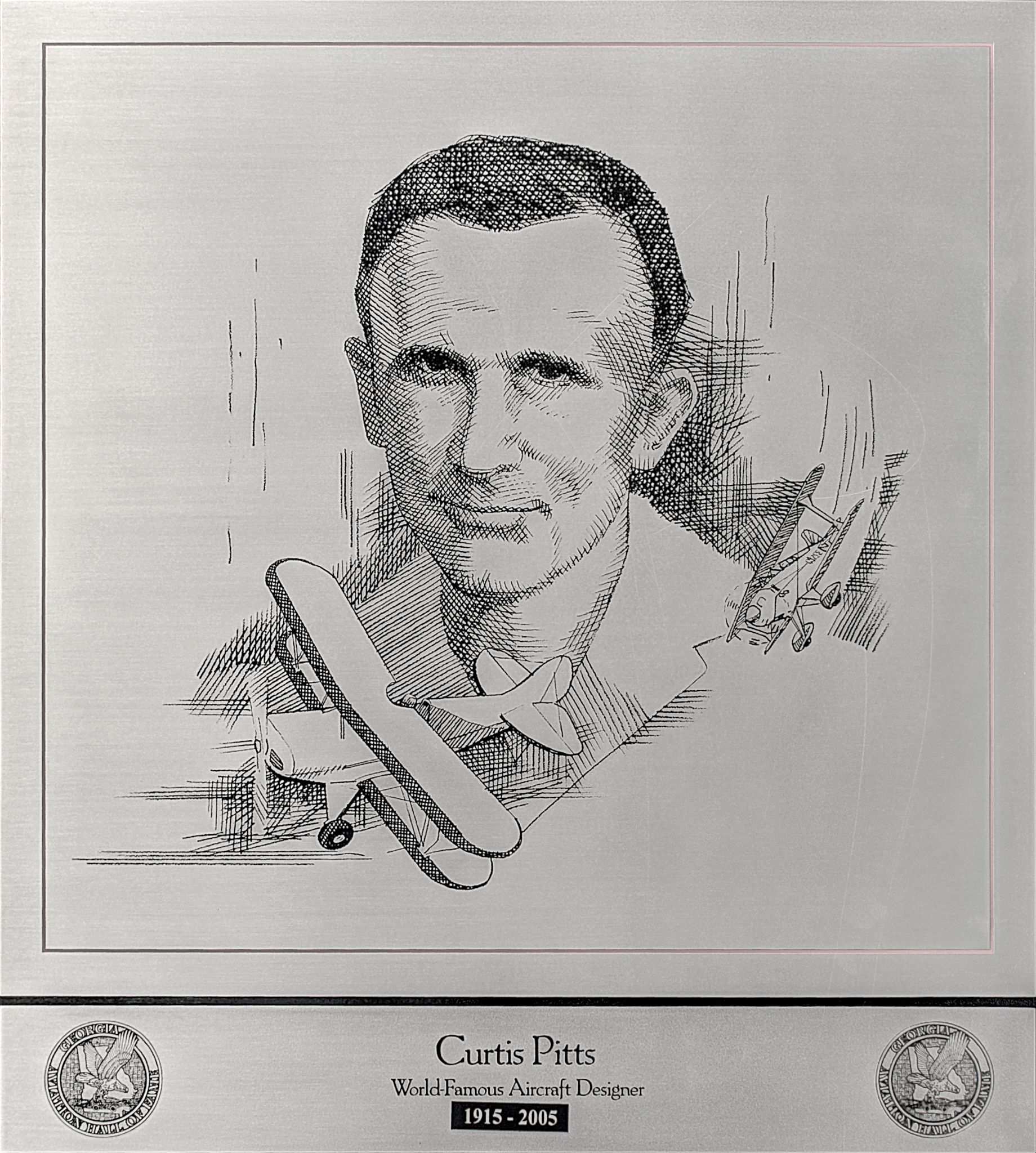
Plaque of Pitts at the Georgia Aviation Hall of Fame

In the 1980 aviation drama film Cloud Dancer Curtis Pitts appears in a brief scene, played by Woodrow Chambliss.

In 1987 he was inducted into the International Aerobatic Club's "Aerobatics Hall of Fame".

His 75th birthday became a major event in 1990, with dozens of Pitts Specials traveling to Florida and hundreds of friends gathering to celebrate. Friends built and flew a replica of the first S-1 prototype to mark the occasion.

Pitts was inducted into the Georgia Aviation Hall of Fame in 1991, and the International Council of Airshows (ICAS) Foundation Hall of Fame in 2002.

"Ma Pitts", Willie Mae, died in 1998.

The last aircraft Curtis designed was the Pitts Model 14, a large biplane similar in size to the Model 12, but no example was built during his lifetime.

== Death ==
Curtis H. Pitts died of complications from heart valve replacement at his home in Homestead, Florida on June 10, 2005. He was 89 years old and survived by two daughters, 8 grandchildren, 16 great-grandchildren, and 8 great-great grandchildren. Beyond his immediate family, his memory is treasured by a vast extended "family" of friends in the aerobatics community.

== Legacy ==
Hundreds of Pitts Specials remain on aircraft registries world wide, and more continue to be built, sometimes with "Thanks Curtis!" painted on their tails.

Aviation writer and Pitts owner/pilot Budd Davisson summarized it best when he wrote: "To most folks outside of the Pitts community, those of us who fly his little biplanes appear to be just another group of enthusiasts who like a specific kind of flying machine. But it's more than that. Once you learn to make love to that sometimes-cantankerous little flying machine, you inevitably find that it's more than a machine. It's a semi-animate being that becomes a living part of your life. The boundary between man and machine, between mechanical interest and lifestyle, blurs, and you find yourself part of a community of kindred souls, all of whom have the same father—Curtis Pitts. You're part of a brotherhood because of that. There's a feeling of family and belonging that's hard to explain, and at the heart of it all is the love of a smiling, slow-talking gent from Homestead, Fla."

== See also ==
- https://www.iac.org/
- https://www.biplaneforum.com/
- https://www.facebook.com/PittsFM/
