= Pitts Samson =

American aerobatic aircraft

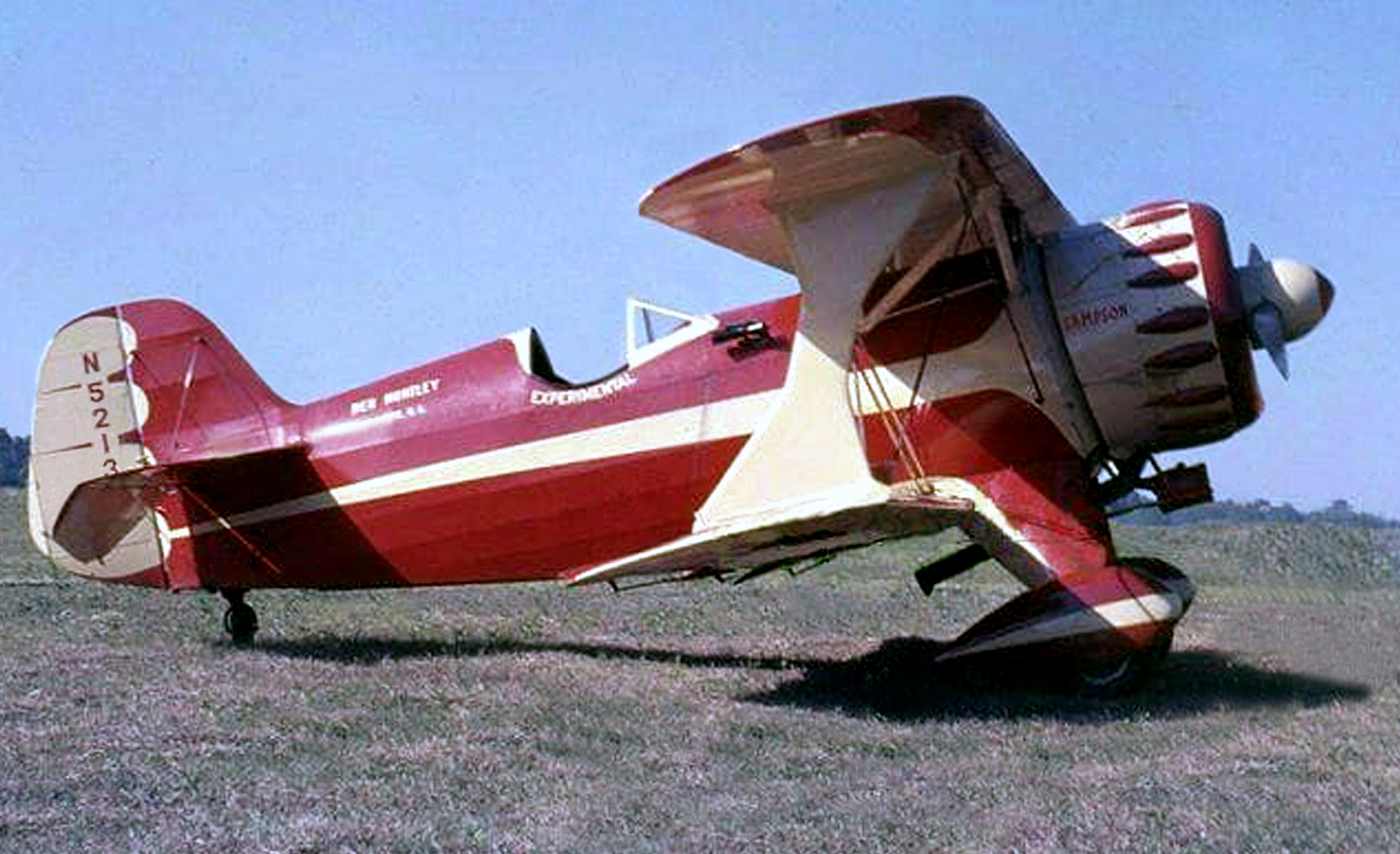
- The Pitts Samson in 1949

General information
- Type: Aerobatic biplane
- National origin: United States
- Designer: Curtis Pitts
- Status: Destroyed
- Number built: 1

History
- First flight: 1948
- Developed from: Pitts Special

The Pitts Samson was an aerobatic biplane designed by Curtis Pitts in 1948.

== Design and development ==
The Samson was designed for aerobatic pilot Jess Bristow. It was a larger variant of the earlier Pitts Special, built using war surplus parts. It had an open cockpit and was powered by a single Pratt & Whitney R-985 Wasp Junior radial engine.

== Operational history ==
In 1952, the sole Samson, registered N52137, suffered a mid-air collision and crash landed, being destroyed in the resulting fire. Pilot Buddy Rogers was uninjured.

== Replicas ==
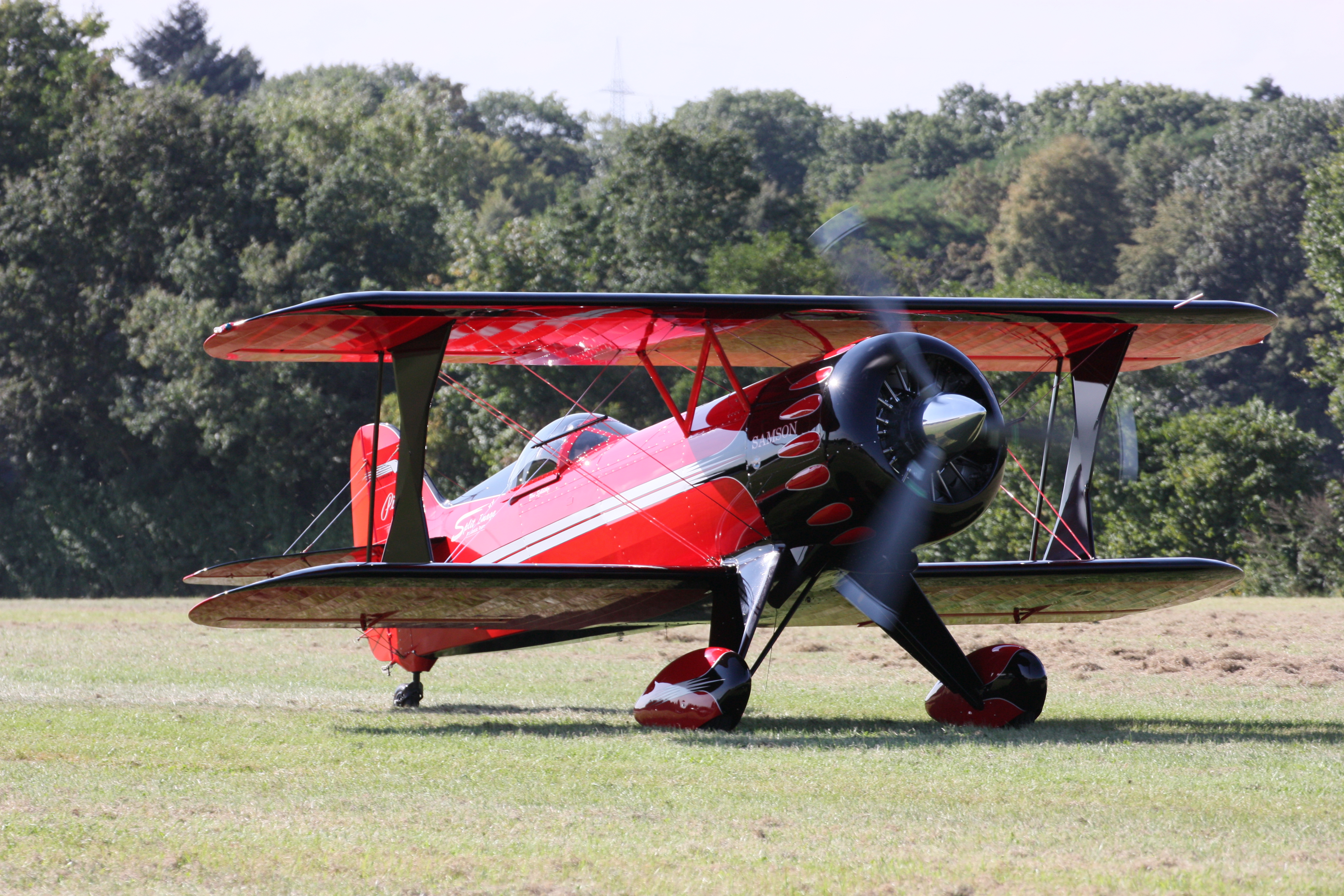
Wolf Samson II, a modernized Pitts Samson replica

Wolf Aircraft built a replica of the Samson in 1985. Like the original, the replica was powered by a 450 hp R-985 Wasp Junior. This aircraft was also destroyed in a mid-air collision in 2005, killing pilot Bobby Younkin and his airshow partner Jimmy Franklin.

Wolf Aircraft built a second Samson replica in 2005 for the company's founder, Steve Wolf, who sold it to a German pilot shortly after it was completed. The aircraft, referred to as "Samson II", is of a modified design, with the fuselage being a foot shorter than the original and featuring ailerons on the top wing. The aircraft was eventually bought by American pilot Tim Just under the registration N985TJ, and was reportedly involved in an accident on May 20, 2018, in which it lost control on landing and came to rest inverted, though the pilot was uninjured.

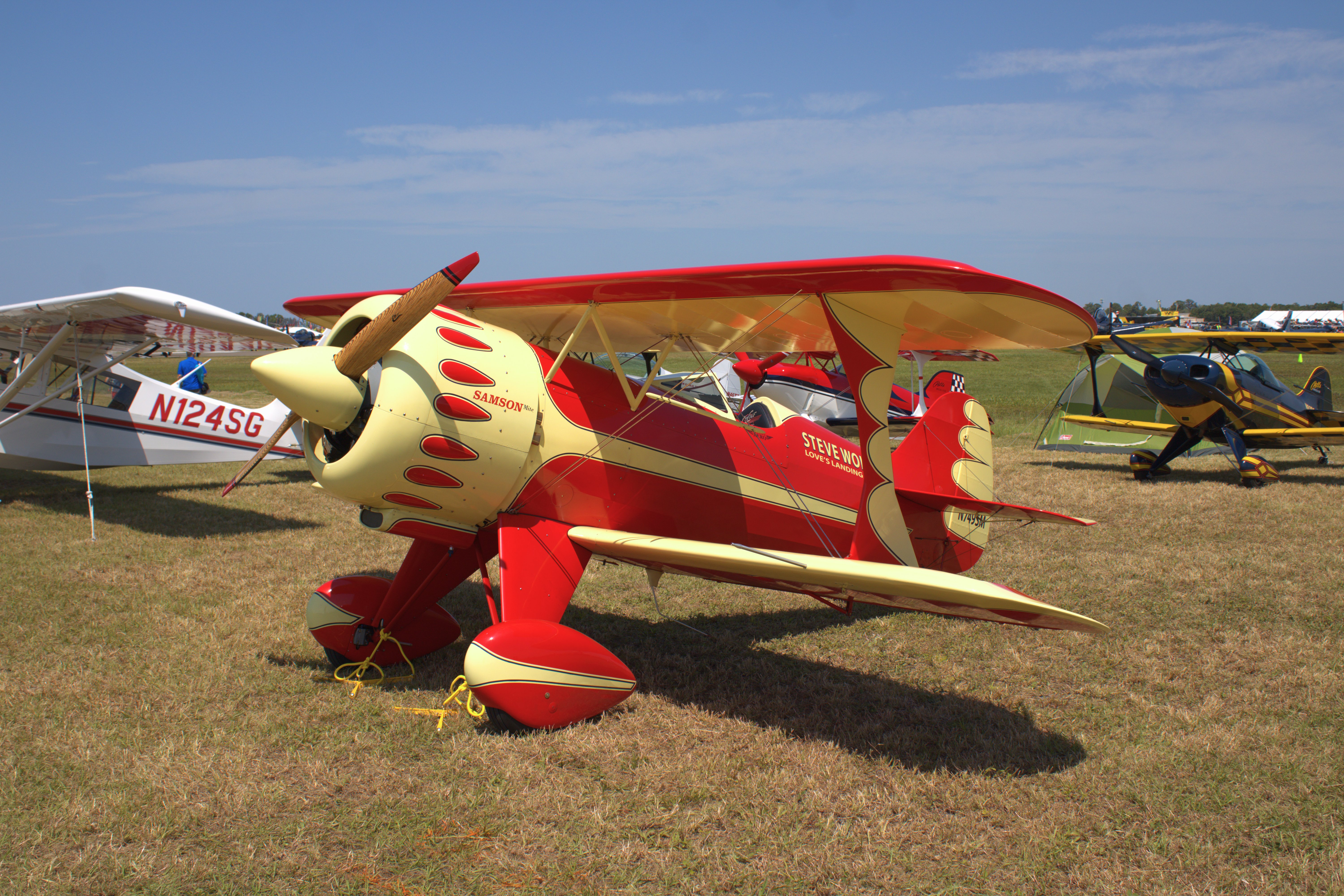
Wolf Samson Mite at 2024 Sun 'n Fun

Steve Wolf built a third Samson replica as the "Samson Mite". The Samson Mite is a 75% scale version of the original Wolf Samson replica and was originally powered by a 150 hp (110 kW) Rotec R3600 engine driving a 86 in (220 cm) Whirl Wind propeller. The aircraft has a wing area of 110 sq ft (10 m^{2}) and features ailerons on the bottom wings. The Samson Mite was debuted during the 2017 Sun 'n Fun airshow, and by October 2018 the original Rotec engine had been replaced with a 168 hp (125 kW) Verner Motor unit.

B & R Aviation began construction of a Samson replica for Pip Borrman in 2000. This replica was of a modernized design, featuring metal and carbon fiber construction, the airfoil of a Beechcraft Model 17 Staggerwing, and the control surfaces of a Pitts Model 11 "Super Stinker". It was powered by a fuel injected R-985 Wasp Junior which drove a MT propeller. The aircraft, registered VH-EAB, was completed in 2008. At approximately 14:30 on February 25, 2009, Borrman's Samson suffered an engine failure and crashed while practicing for the following month's Australian International Airshow, destroying the aircraft and killing Borrman.

== Specifications (Samson) ==
Data from

General characteristics

- Crew: 1
- Length: 20 ft 6 in (6.25 m)
- Wingspan: 24 ft 0 in (7.32 m)
- Wing area: 185 sq ft (17.18 m^{2})
- Aspect ratio: 5.76
- Empty weight: 1,900 lb (862 kg)
- Gross weight: 2,671 lb (1,212 kg)
- Powerplant: 1 × Pratt & Whitney R-985 Wasp Junior nine-cylinder radial engine, 450 hp (336 kW)

Performance

- Cruise speed: 180 mph (290 km/h, 160 kn)
- Wing loading: 14.14 lb/sq ft (69.0 kg/m^{2})
- Power/mass: 5.86 lb/hp

== See also ==
Related development

- Pitts Special
- Pitts Model 12
- Vancil Spitz S1

Aircraft of comparable role, configuration, and era

- Acro Sport II
- Sorrell Hiperbipe
- Steen Skybolt
- Aviat Eagle II
